= List of State Ladies of Imperial Russia =

State Ladies of Imperial Russia

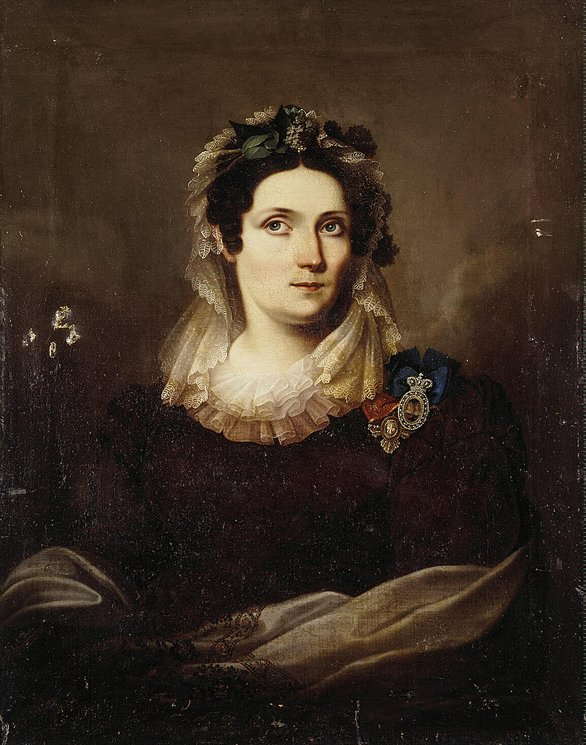
Portrait of an unknown Statsdame, bearing the Order of Saint Catherine

State Ladies or Statsdame at the Russian Imperial Court were the second largest group of court ladies, after maids of honour. This position was officially established during the reign of Paul I, at the coronation of his wife Maria Feodorovna. Before that women simply carried portraits of the empress. As a general rule of thumb, most of the ladies of state were also cavalry ladies, women awarded with the Order of Saint Catherine, given to them for their philanthropy or charity at court. When appointed to the position, the women were bestowed with a portrait of the Empress with a crown set in diamonds, similar to the maid of honour cipher.

In 1870 and 1871, the Russkaya Starina magazine published an extensive list of State Ladies, compiled by Pavel Fedorovich Karabanov.

== State Ladies of Empress Catherine (until 1725) ==
No.	Appointment date	Portrait	Name	Birth and death	Note
1	1 August 1711		Princess Anastasia Petrovna Golitsyna	1665–1729	Wife (since 1684) of Prince Ivan Alekseevich Golitsyn
2	1 August 1711		Princess Kassandra (Alexandra) Sergeevna Kantemir	1682–1713	Married Prince Dimitrie Cantemir in 1685 Emperor Peter I bestowed her with his portrait, but in fact she was never called a lady of state.
3	1 August 1711		Anastasia Markovna Skoropadskaya	1667–1729	Married Hetman Ivan Skoropadsky in 1700
4	1 August 1711		Maria (Vassa) Yakovlevna Stroganova	1677–1733	The second wife of Grigory Dmitriyevich Stroganov Emperor Peter I honored her with his portrait. Considered the first state lady
5	7 May 1724 (Coronation of Catherine I)		Matryona Ivanovna Balk		Married Fedor Nikolaevich Balk in 1699
6	7 May 1724		Elizaveta Ivanovna Vilboa	mind. 1757	Wife of Captain 1st Rank Nikita Villebois Daughter of pastor E. Gluck, whom Catherine I served as a girl
7	7 May 1724		Baroness Margaret Campenghausen	mind. 1733	Married Baron Ivan Ivanovich von Campenhausen in 1712
8	7 May 1724		Anna Ivanovna Olsufieva	mind. 1748	Married Matvey Dmitrievich Olsufiev in 1719

== State Ladies of Empress Catherine I (1725–1727) ==
No.	Appointment date	Portrait	Name	Birth and death	Note
1	21 May 1725 (the wedding of Princess Anna Petrovna)		Countess Anna Gavrilovna Bestuzheva-Ryumina	mind. 1751	Until 1722 she was a Maid of Honour Married Count Pavel Yaguzhinsky in 1723
2	21 May 1725		Countess Marfa Ivanovna Osterman	1698–1781	Married Count Andrey Osterman in 1721
3	21 May 1725		Princess Maria Yurievna Cherkasskaya	1696–1747	Married of Prince Alexey Cherkassky in 1710 On December 18, 1741, Empress Elizabeth approved her with the rank of lady of state and awarded her with her portrait.
4	21 May 1725		Countess Avdotya Ivanovna Chernysheva	1693–1747	Married Grigory Petrovich Chernyshev in 1710 In 1742 she and her husband were granted the title of count. She was a lady of state under Empress Elizabeth and had her portrait.
5	10 March 1726		Natalya Fyodorovna Lopukhina	1699–1763	Married Stepan Vasiliyevich Lopukhin in 1715

== State Ladies of Empress Anna Ivanovna (1730–1740) ==
No.	Appointment date	Portrait	Name	Birth and death	
1	3 May 1730 (Coronation Day)		Duchess Benigna Gottlieba Biron	1703–1782	Married Ernst Johann von Biron, Duke of Courland and Semigallia in 1723
2	May 3, 1730		Countess Ekaterina Ivanovna Golovkina	1703–1782	Married Count Mikhail Golovkin in 1722
3	May 3, 1730		Countess Praskovya Yurievna Saltykova	1704–1767	Married Pyotr Saltykov in 1715 In 1733 she and her husband were granted the dignity of a count. Since December 1741, the lady of state of Empress Elizabeth Petrovna, with the award of a portrait

== State Ladies of Empress Elizabeth Petrovna ==
No.	Appointment date	Portrait	Name	Years of life	Note
1	25 November 1741		Princess Anastasia Ivanova of Hesse-Homburg	1700–1755	Married Prince Dimitrie Cantemir in 1717 In 1723 she married secondly Ludwig Gruno of Hesse-Homburg
2	18 December 1741		Maria Alekseevna Saltykova	1701–1752	Married General-in-Chief Vasily Fedorovich Saltykov
3	25 April 1742 (coronation day)		Countess Anna Karlovna Vorontsova	1722–1775	Married Chancellor Mikhail Illarionovich Vorontsov in 1741 Became Chief Chamberlain of the Court 29 June 1760
4	25 April 1742		Countess Anna Artemyevna Hendrikova	1723–1744	Married Count Andrei Simonovich Hendrikov in 1742
5	25 April 1742		Maria Simonovna Choglokova	1723–1756	Married Nikolai Naumovich Choglokov c.1742 Married secondly Alexander Glebov Became Chief Chamberlain of the court 26 May 1746
6	25 April 1742		Countess Marva Yegorovna Shuvalova	1708–1759	Married Peter Ivanovich Shuvalov in 1742
7	28 January 1743		Countess Varvara Alekseevna Sheremeteva	1711–1767	Married Pyotr Sheremetev in 1743
8	6 September 1746		Countess Maria Andreevna Rumyantseva	1699–1788	Married Alexander Rumyantsev in 1720 Became Chief Chamberlain of the Court 10 July 1778
9	28 October 1746		Countess Ekaterina Ivanova Razumovskaya	1729–1771	Married Count Kirill Razumovski in 1746
10	1747		Baroness Ekaterina Karlovna Korf	– 1745	Married Baron Nikolai Andreevich Korf
11	1747		Princess Irina Grigorievna Trubetskaya	1669–1749	Married Prince Ivan Trubetskoy in 1691
12	5 November 1747		Marfa Simonovna Safonova	1727–1753	Married Lieutenant General Mikhail Ivanovich Safanov in 1747
11	December 1747		Anastasia Mikhailovna Izmailovna	1703–1761	Married Major General Vasili Andreevich Izmailov
12	1749		Elena Alexandrovna Naryshinka	1708–1767	Married Alexander Lvovich Naryshkin Became Chamberlain of the Supreme Court in 1762
13	28 January 1751		Princess Ekaterina Dmitrievna Golitsyna	1720–1761	Married Prince Dmitry Mikhailovich Golitsyn in 1751 Became Chambermaid of Honour in 1744
14	1756		Countess Maria Nikolaena Skavronskaya	1732–1805	Married Count Martyn Karlovich Skavronsky in 1754
15	1756		Princess Anna Lvovna Trubetskaya	1704–1776	Married Prince Alexei Yuryevich Trubetskoy
16	26 October 1756		Agrippina Leontieva Apraksina	1719–1771	Married Field Marshal Stepan Fyodorovich Apraksin

== State Ladies of Empress Catherine II ==
No.	Appointment date	Portrait	Name	Years of life	Note
1	22 September 1762 (coronation day)		Princess Ekaterina Romanovna Dashkova	1743–1810	Married Prince Mikhail (Kondrat) Ivanovich Dashkov in 1759
2	22 September 1762		Countess Anna Alekseevna Matyushkina	1722–1804	Married Count Dmitry Mikhailovich Matyushkin in 1754 Became Chief Chamberlain of the Court in 1796 The first lady to wear a portrait on the right side
3	15 August 1773		Countess Praskovya Alexandrovna Bruce	1729–1786	Married Count James Bruce in 1751
4	15 August 1773		Princess Daria Alekseevna Golitsyna	1724–1789	Married Prince Alexander Mikhailovich Golitsyn in 1747
5	15 August 1773		Countess Ekaterina Mikhailovna Rumyantseva	1724–1779	Married Count Pyotr Rumyantsev
6	15 September 1773		Anna Nikitichna Naryshkina	1730–1820	Married Senator Alexander Alexandrovich Naryshkin in 1749 Became Chief Chamberlain of the Court in 1796
7	15 September 1773		Countess Anna Rodionovna Chernysheva	1744–1830	Married Count Zakhar Chernyshev
8	1 January 1776		Daria Vasilievna Potemkina	1704–1780	Married Alexander Vasilievich Potemkin
9	22 September 1777		Most Serene Princess Ekaterina Nikolaevna Orlova	1758–1781	Married His Serene Highness Prince Grigory Orlov in 1777
10	12 November 1781		Countess Alexandra Vasilievna Branitskaya	1754–1838	Married Count Franciszek Ksawery Branicki in 1781 Became Chief Chamberlain of the Court in 1824
11	17 August 1786		Countess Ekaterina Vasilievna Skavronskaya	1761–1829	Married Count Pavel Martynovich Skavronsky in 1781 Married Second Count Giulio Renato Litta Became Camberlain of the Court in 1824
12	1792		Countess Yuzefina Amalia Potocka	1752–1798	Married Count Stanisław Szczęsny Potocki in 1774
13	1792		Countess Ekaterina Petrovna Shuvalova	1743–1816	Married Count Andrei Petrovich Shuvalov in 1762
14	2 September 1793		Countess Daria Petrovna Saltykova	1739–1802	Married Count Ivan Saltykov in 1771
15	2 September 1793		Countess Natalya Vladimirovna Saltykova	1736–1812	Married Count Nikolai Saltykov in 1762
16	5 April 1794		Broness Charlotte Karlovna Lieven	1742–1828	Married Baron Otto-Heinrich von Lieven in 1799 Became Most Serent Princess 1826
17	31 December		Princess Natalya Alexandrovna Repnina	1737–1798	Married Prince Nicholas Vasilyevich Repnin
18	1 January 1795		Countess Elizaveta Vasilievna Zubova	1742–1813	Married Count Alexander Nikolaevich Zubova

== State Ladies of Empress Maria Feodorovna (Sophie Dorothea of Württemberg) (1796–1801) ==
No.	Appointment date	Portrait	Name	Years of life	Note
1	10 November 1796		Countess Praskovya Vasilievna Musina-Pushkina	1754–1826	Married Count Valentin Musin-Pushkin in 1759
2	13 November 1796		Maria Andreevna Renne	1752–1810	Married Lieutenant General Karl Ivanovich Renn Chamberlain of the Court of Grand Duchess Anna Feodorovna
3	22 November 1796		Sofia Ivanovna de Lafont	1717–1797	Head of the Smolny Institute of Noble Maidens
4	5 April 1797 (coronation day)		Evdokia Mikhailovna Bezborodkova	1716–1803	Married Andrei Yakovlevich Bezborodko
5	5 April 1797		Princess Ekaterina Alexandrovna Dolgorukova	1750–1811	Married Prince Yuri Vladimirovich Dolgorukov
6	5 April 1797		Elizaveta Mikhailovna Eropkina	1727–1800	Married General-in-Chief Pyotr Dmitrievich Eropkin
7	5 April 1797		Countess Anna Pavlovna Kamenskaya	1749–1826	Married Count Mikhail Kamensky
8	5 April 1797		Countess Ursula Mnishek	1750–1808	Married Count Michał Jerzy Mniszech in 1781
9	5 April 1797		Marina Osipovna Naryshkina	1741–1800	Married Chief of the Ringmaster Lev Aleksandrovich Naryshkin in 1759
10	5 April 1797		Princess Elena Radziwill	1753–1821	Married Prince Michał Hieronim Radziwiłł in 1771
11	20 July 1791		Princess Louise-Emmanuelle de Châtillon	1743–1814	Married Charles Bretagne Marie de La Trémoille, Duke of La Tremouille Former Dame du Palais to Marie Antoinette
12	6 September 1798		Most Serene Princess Ekaterina Nikolaevna Lopukhina	1763–1839	Married Pyotr Lopukhin in 1786
13	17 April 1799		Countess Yuliana Ivanovna Palen	1751–1814	Married Count Peter Ludwig von der Pahlen in 1773 who played a part in the assassination of Paul I
14	8 February 1800		Princess Anna Petrovna Gagarina	1777–1805	Married Prince Pavel Gavrilovich Gagarin in 1800 Mistress of Paul I

== State Ladies of Empress Elizabeth Alexeievna (1801–1825) ==
No.	Appointment date	Portrait	Name	Years of life	Note
1	15 September 1801 (coronation day)		Countess Ekaterina Alexandrovna Golovkina	1733–1821	Married Count Gavriil Ivanovich Golovkin in 1750
2	15 September 1801		Princess Anna Mikhailovna Prozorovskaya	1749–1824	Married Prince Alexander Prozorovsky in 1780
3	15 September 1801		Countess Varvara Ivanovna Suvorova-Rymnik, Princess of Italy	1750–1806	Married Prince Alexander Suvorov, Prince of Italy and Sardinia in 1774
4	12 December 1801		Countess Anna Vasilievna Osterman	1732–1809	Married Count Fyodor Andreevich Osterman
5	18 November 1806		Evdokia Ilyinichna Golenischeva-Kutozova	1743–1807	Married Ivan Loginovich Golenishchev-Kutuzov
6	18 November 1806		Princess Natalya Petrovna Golitsyna	1744–1837	Married Prince Vladimir Borisovich Golitsyn in 1766
7	18 November 1806		Countess Praskovya Kirillovna Gudovich	1755–1808	Married Count Ivan Gudovich
8	1 January 1808		Princess Alexandra Nikolaevna Volkonskaya	1757–1834	Married Prince Grigory Semyonovich Volkonsky in 1777
9	1 January 1808		Maria Alekseevna Naryshkina	1762–1822	Married Aleksandr Naryshkin Former Maid of Honour to Catherine II
10	1811		Countess Hedviga Pontusovna Armfelt	1761–1832	Married to Gustaf Mauritz Armfelt
11	30 August 1812		Most Serene Princess Ekaterina Ilyinichna Golenishcheva-Kutuzova	1754–1824	Married to Most Serene Prince Mikhail Kutuzov
12	30 August 1814		Elena Ivanovna Barclay de Tolly	1770–1828	Married Prince Michael Andreas Barclay de Tolly in 1793
13	12 January 1820		Countess Antionette Stanislavovna Wittgenstein	1779–1855	Married Peter Wittgenstein, 1st Prince of Sayn-Wittgenstein-Ludwigsburg-Berleburg in 1798
14	24 February 1842		Yuilia Feodorovna Adlerberg	1760–1839	Head of the Smolny Institute

== State Ladies of Empress Alexandra Feodorovna (Charlotte of Prussia) ==
No.	Appointment date	Portrait	Name	Years of life	Note
1	22 August 1826 (coronation day)		Yelizaveta Petrovna Glebova-Streshneva	1751–1837	Married Fyodor Ivanovich Glebov in 1772
2	22 August 1826		Princess Tatyana Vasilievna Golitsyna	1783–1841	Married Prince Dmitry Golitsyn in 1800
3	22 August 1826		Countess Praskovya Nikolaevna Guryeva	1764–1830	Married Count Dmitry Guryev in 1785
4	22 August 1826		Princess Ekaterina Feodorovna Dolgorukova	1769–1849	Married Prince Vasily Vasilyevich Dolgorukov in 1786
5	22 August 1826		Princess Alexandra Yakovlena Zaionchek	mind. 1845	Married Prince Józef Zajączek in 1786
6	22 August 1826		Countess Sofia Adamovna Zamoyskaya	1778–1837	Married Count Stanisław Kostka Zamoyski in 1798
7	22 August 1826		Countess Maria Vasilievna Kochubey	1779–1844	Married Count Viktor Kochubey in 1799 The couple were granted the titles of prince and princess in 1831
8	22 August 1826		Princess Natalia Ivanovna Kurakina	1766–1831	Married Prince Alexey Kurakin in 1783
9	22 August 1826		Natalya Feodorovna Pleshcheeva	1768–1855	Married Vice Admiral Sergei Ivanovich Meshkov-Plescheev
10	22 August 1826		Countess Maria Alekseevna Tolstaya	1771–1826	Married Count Pyotr Aleksandrovich Tolstoy
11	20 April 1827		Ekaterina Vladimirovna Apraskina	1770–1854	Married Stepan Stepanovich Apraksin
12	29 February 1828		Countess Daria Khristoforovna Lieven	1785–1857	Married Count Christoph von Lieven in 1800
13	21 April 1828		Ekaterina Alexandrovna Pashkova	1768–1835	Married Vasily Alexandrovich Pashkov
14	11 May 1829		Maria Antonovna Brontis		Wife of the Chief Marshall and Aunt of Joanna Grudzińska
15	11 May 1829		Countess Isabella Ivanovna Sobolevskaya	1776–1858	Married Count Valent Faustin Sobolewski Illegitimate Daughter of Stanisław August Poniatowski
16	16 Jule 1829		Countess Elizaveta Alekseevna Paskevich	1791–1856	Married Count Ivan Paskevich in 1817
17	1829		Countess Anna (Zhenni) Egorovna Dibich-Zabalkanskaya	1798–1830	Married Count Hans Karl von Diebitsch in 1815
18	13 June 1830		Maria Matveevna Gutakovskaya	1766–1843	Married Chancellor Ludwik Szymon Gutakowski
19	7 November 1831		Varvara Dmitrievna Mukhanova	1774–1845	Married Sergei Ilyich Mukhanov
20	1832		Princess Anna Grigoryevna Beloselskaya-Belozerskaya	1773–1846	Married Prince Alexander Mikhailovich Beloselsky-Belozersky in 1795
21	1832		Serene Princess Sofia Grigorievna Volkonskaya	1785–1868	Married His Serene Highness Prince Pyotr Mikhailovich Volkonsky
22	30 June 1835		Serene Princess Ekaterina Vasilievna Saltykova	1791–1863	Married Serene Prince Sergei Nikolaevich Saltykov Chamerlain to Empress Maria Alexandrovna (Marie of Hesse)
23	21 April 1836		Countess Maria Dmitrievna Nesselrode	1786–1849	Married Count Karl Nesselrode
24	5 December 1837		Countess Tatyana Vasilievna Vasilchikova	1793–1875	Married Count Illarion Vasilievich Vasilchikov in 1816 The couple were granted princely status in 1839
25	5 December 1837		Princess Elizaveta Nikolaevna Chernysheva	1808–1872	Married Prince Alexander Chernyshyov in 1825
26	15 August 1838		Countess Elizaveta Ksaveryevna Vorotsova	1792–1880	Married Count Mikhail Semyonovich Vorontsov in 1819
27	25 March 1839		Countess Elizaveta Andreevna Benckendorff	1788–1857	Married Count Alexander von Benckendorff in 1817
28	1 July 1839		Countess Yulia Feodorovna Baranova	1789–1864	Married Chamberlain Trofim Osipovich Baranov Granted status of a count in 1846
29	31 May 1841		Countess Rosalia Alexandrovna Rzhevuskaya	1788–1865	Married Count Wacław Seweryn Rzewuski
30	30 June 1847		Baroness Cecilia Vlasislavovna Fredereeks	1794–1851	Married Baron Pyotr Andreevich Fredereeks
31	30 June 1847		Countess Olga Alexandrovna Orlova	1807–1880	Married Count Alexey Fyodorovich Orlov in 1826 In 1856 the couple were granted princley status
32	20 April 1848		Countess Edokia Vasilievna Levashova	1796–1868	Married Count Vasily Vasilyevich Levashov
33	20 April 1848		Praskovya Ivanovna Myatleva	1772–1859	Married Chamberlain Pyotr Vasilyevich Myatlev in 1795
34	5 December 1848		Princess Ekaterina Alekseevna Volkonskaya	1770–1853	Married Prince Dmitry Petrovich Volkonsky
35	22 August 1851		Coutess Cleopatra Petrovna Kleinmichel	1811–1865	Married Count Pyotr Kleinmichel in 1832
36	23 April 1854		Elizaveta Mikhailovna Buturlina	1805–1859	Married Dmitry Buturlin in 1824
37	23 April 1854		Countess Ekaterina Mikhailovna Ribopoerre	1788–1872	Married Count Alexander Ivanovich Ribopierre in 1809
38	18 November 1848		Princess Sofia Alekseevna Shakhovskaya	1790–1878	Married Prince Ivan Leontievich Shakhovskoy in 1820

== State Ladies of Empress Maria Alexandrovna ==
No.	Appointment date	Portrait	Name	Years of life	Note
1	26 August 1856 (coronation day)		Countess Maria Vasilievna Adlerberg	1797–1870	Married Count Vladimir Fyodorovich Adlerberg in 1817
2	26 August 1856		Princess Agafoklea Nikolaevna Gorchakova	1802–1888	Married Prince Mikhail Dmitrievich Gorchakov
3	26 August 1856		Princess Ekaterina Alexandrovna Dadiani of Mingrelia	1816–1882	Married Sovereign Prince David I Dadiani of Mingrelia
4	23 April 1861		Princess Ekaterina Dmitrievna Dolgorukova	1801–1881	Married Prince Nikolai Vasilievich Dolgorukov in 1821
5	23 April 1861		Countess Natalya Dmitrievna Protasova	1803–1880	Married Count Nikolay Protasov Became Chamberlain in March 1865
6	23 April 1861		Countess Yulia Petrovna Stroganova	1782–1864	Married Count Grigory Alexandrovich Stroganov in 1827
7	7 June 1867		Countess Leopoldina Frantsovna Berg	1786–1874	Married Count Friedrich Wilhelm Rembert von Berg in 1832
8	7 June 1867		Maria Pavlovna Leontieva	1792–1874	Married Nikolai Nikolaevich Leontiev Head of the Smoly Institute for Noble Maidens
9	1869		Princess Sofia Stepanovna Shcherbatova	1798–1885	Married Prince Alexei Grigorievich Shcherbatov in 1817
10	1871		Countess Natalya Pavlovna Panina	1810–1899	Married Count Viktor Nikitich Panin in 1835
11	1872		Countess Ekaterina Nikolaevna Adlerberg	1822–1910	Married Count Alexander Vladimirovich Adlerberg in 1842
12	1873		Princess Yulia Feodorovna Kurakina	1814–1881	Married Prince Alexey Kurakin in 1835
13	1874		Princess Elizaveta Dmitrievna Baryatinskaya	1835–1899	Married Prince Aleksandr Baryatinsky in 1863
14	1874		Elena Pavlovna Zakharzhevskaya	1804–1889	Married Grigory Andreevich Donets-Zakharzhevsky in 1829
15	1875		Elizaveta Petrovna Kotzebue	1818–1902	Married Count Paul Demetrius von Kotzebue in 1837
16	1876		Princess Nadija Feodorovna Chetverinskaya	1792–1883	Married Prince Boris Antonovich Chetvertinsky in 1811

== State Ladies of Maria Feodorovna (Dagmar of Denmark) (1881–1894) ==
No.	Appointment date	Portrait	Name	Years of life	Note
1	28 March 1882		Princess Elena Pavlovna Kochubey	1812–1888	Married Prince Vasily Viktorovich Kochubey in 1847 Became Chief Chamberlain of the Court 1 February 1885
2	July 22, 1882		Princess Louise Trofimovna Golitsyna	1810–1887	Married Prince Mikhail Fedorovich Golitsyn in 1832
3	15 May 1883 (coronation day)		Princess Elizaveta Alexandrvna Baryatinskaya	1826–1902	Married Prince Vladimir Ivanovich Baryatinsky in 1846
4	15 May 1883		Baroness Maria Pavlovna Bugburg	1819–1913	Married Baron Andrey Fedorovich Budberg in 1846
5	15 May 1883		Princess Maria Arkadievna Vyazemskaya	1819–1889	Married Prince Pavel Petrovich Vyazemsky in 1848
6	15 May 1883		Countess Sofia Dmitrievna Tolstaya	1827–1907	Married Count Dmitry Tolstoy in 1853
7	1888		Countess Anna Dmitrievna Stroganova	1828–1906	Married Count Pavel Sergeyevich Stroganov in 1851
8	1891		Countess Elizaveta Nikolaevna Heiden	1833–1894	Married Count Fyodor Logginovich van Heiden in 1854
9	April 1891		Elizaveta Alekseevna Naryshkina	1838–1928	Married Chamberlain A. D. Naryshkin Was Chief Chamberlain of the Court between 1910 and 1917
10	1894		Most Serene Princess Maria Mikhailovna Golitsyna	1834–1910	Married Serene Prince Vladimir Dmitrievich Golitsyn

== State Ladies of Empress Alexandra Feodorovna (Alix of Hesse) (1894–1917) ==
No.	Date of Appointment	Portrait	Name	Birth and death	Notes
1	14 May 1896 (Coronation Day)		Alexandra Sergeevna Albedinskaya	1834–1913	Married Pyotr Albedinsky in 1862
2	14 May 1896		Countess Elizaveta Andreevna Vorontsov-Dashkov	1845–1924	Married Count Illarion Vorontsov-Dashkov in 1867
3	14 May 1896		Princess Sofia Andreevna Gagarina	1882–1908	Married Prince Grigory Gagarin in 1848
4	14 May 1896		Countess Elena Karlovna Palen	1833–1910	Married Count Konstantin Ivanovich Palen in 1857
5	14 May 1896		Princess Nadezhda Borisovna Trubetskaya	1812–1909	Married Prince Alexei Ivanovich Trubetskoy in 1834
6	22 July 1898		Aurora Karlovna Karamzin	1808–1902	Married Colonel Andrei Karamzin in 1846
7	1901		Elizaveta Konstantinova Richter	1841–1916	Married Otton Borisovich Richter in 1867 Granted baronial rights based on the merits of her deceased husband.
8	1903–1906		Princess Elizaveta Nikolaevna Bagration-Mukhranskaya	1840–1916	Married Prince K. I. Bagration-Mukhransky in 1858
9	1903–1906		Countess Lybov Alexandrovna Musina-Pushkina	1833–1917	Married Count Alexei Ivanovich Musin-Pushkin in 1852
10	1903–1906		Countess Yadviga Aloizievna Freedericksz	1838–1919	Married Count Woldemar Freedericksz
11	10 April 1910		Countess Alexandra Andreevna Olsufievna	1846–1929	Married Count Alexei Vasilyevich Olsufiev Chamberlain to Grand Duchess Elizaveta Feodorovna (1891–1910)
12	1912		Princess Olga Petrovna Dolgoruka	1848–1927	Married Prince Alexander Sergeevich Dolgoruky in 1868
13	1912		Alexandra Alekseevna Kozen	1840–1919	Married Alexander Fedorovich Kozen in 1870
13	1912		Countess Praskovya Sergeevna Uvarova	1840–1924	Married Count Aleksey Uvarov in 1859
14	1912		Countess Ekaterina Pavlovna Sheremeteva	1849–1929	Married Count Sergei Sheremetev in 1868
15	14 November 1913		Princess Nadija Alexandrovna Baryatinskaya	1847–1920	Married Prince Vladimir Anatolyevich Baryatinsky in 1869
16	1914		Alexandra Mikhailovna Apraksina	1829–1916	Married Viktor Vladimirovich Apraksin
17	1915		Alexandra Nikolaevna Naryshkina	1839–1918	Married Emmanuil Dmitrievich Naryshkin in 1871

== Literature ==
- Address-calendar. The general list of commanding and other officials in all departments of the Russian Empire. St. Petersburg, 1831–1916
- The court of Russian emperors in its past and present // Comp. N. E. Volkov. In 4 parts. – St. Petersburg, 1900. – S. 208–230.
- P. F. Karabanov. Ladies of state and ladies-in-waiting of the Russian court in the 18th century // Russian antiquity. – 1870. – Volume 2. – S. 468–498.
- P. F. Karabanov. Ladies of state and ladies-in-waiting of the Russian court in the 18th century // Russian antiquity. – 1871. – Volume 3. – S. 39–48; 272–282; 457–460.
- Commemorative book for 1869. – St. Petersburg: Court Printing House. – S. 279.
- Court calendar. St. Petersburg, 1879–1889, 1895, 1897, 1903, 1911, 1915, 1916
