= Sofia Andreyevna Gagarina =

Russian maid of honour

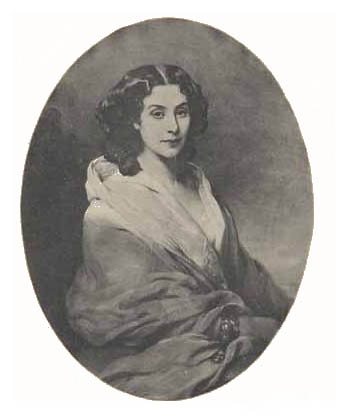
- Portrait by Franz Xaver Winterhalter
- Born: Sofia Andreevna Dashkova; 25 June 1822; Saint Petersburg, Russian Empire
- Died: 10 December 1908 (aged 86); Saint Petersburg, Russian Empire
- Noble family: Dashkov
- Spouse: Grigory Gagarin
- Issue: Maria Grigorievna Gagarina
- Father: Andrey Vasilievich Dashkov
- Mother: Anastasia Nikolaevna Dmitrieva-Mamonova

Princess Sofia Andreyevna Gagarina (Russian: Софья Андреевна Гагарина), née Dashkova (25 June 1822 – 10 December 1908) was a maid of honour, later state lady, and wife of the Chief Chamberlain of Prince Grigory Gagarin.

== Biography ==
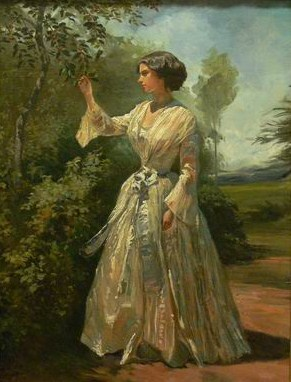
Sofia in a portrait by her husband.

Sophia was born to Senator Andrei Vasilyevich Dashkov (1790-1865) from his marriage to Anastasia Petrovna Dmitrieva-Mamonova (1801-1834). From 1830 she lived with her parents and older brother Vasily in Ryazan, where her father served as governor. After the early death of her mother, she was brought up at the Catherine Institute in St. Petersburg, from which she graduated in 1841 with a large gold cipher. Immediately after graduation, she was appointed maid of honor to Grand Duchess Maria Alexandrovna.

Sweet and pleasant in appearance, Dashkova enjoyed success in the world and was the subject of the most ardent passion of Grand Duke Alexander Nikolaevich. However, these hobbies almost always ended solely in the adoration she had for her mistress. In 1847, she accompanied the crown princess on a trip to Darmstadt, from there to the waters of Kissengen, and then to Stuttgart. During the trip, Sophia became close to the widower Prince Grigory Grigorievich Gagarin (1810-1893), who came to the waters with his little daughter. In many ways, their hasty union was facilitated by the Hofmeisterin, Princess Ekaterina Saltykova. She knew well all the positive qualities of Dashkova and believed that she could Gagarin's late wife.

Having received permission from the emperor, Prince Gagarin proposed and on 17 August 1847 in Darmstadt he married Sofia Dashkova. The poet Fyodor Tyutchev reported to his wife:

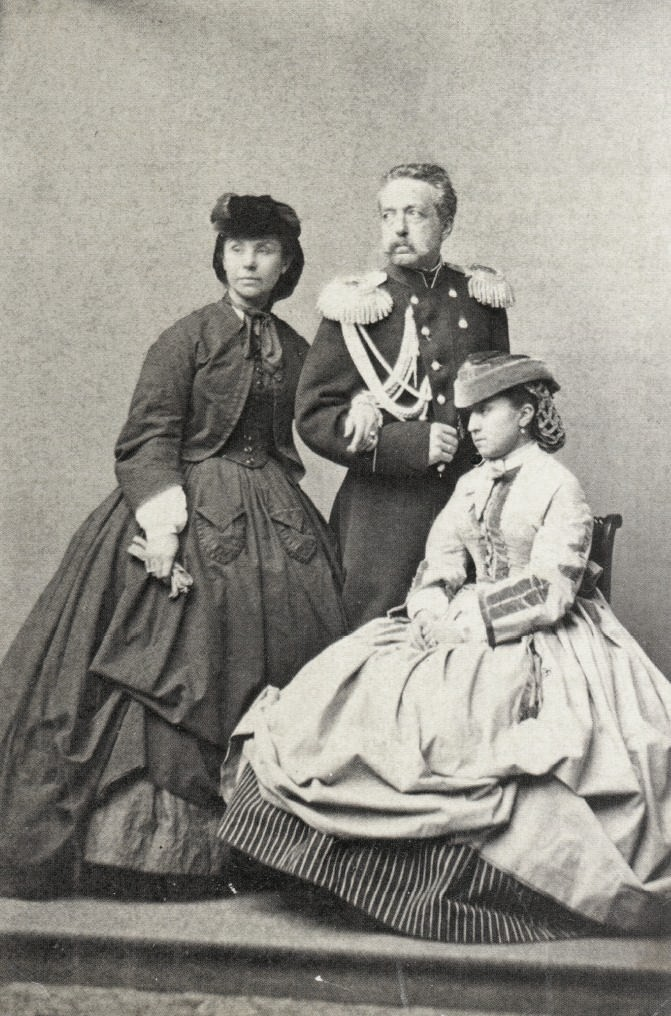
Grigori and Sophia Gagarin, with daughter Ekaterina, 1860's

"Today Zhukovsky is attending the wedding of Grigory Gagarin, who is marrying the darkest girl I have ever seen."

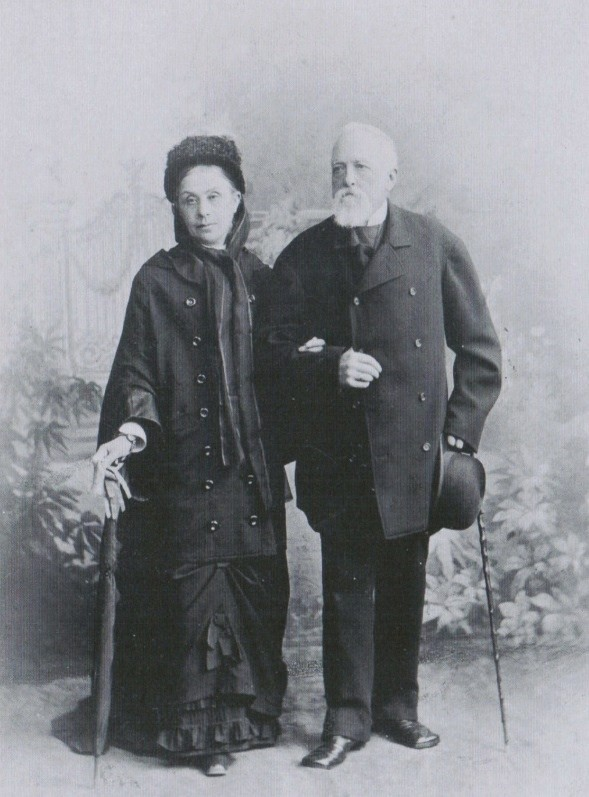
Sofia and Grigori Gagarin, 1880s

In 1848, Prince Gagarin was sent to the Caucasus. The arrival of the Gagarins in Tiflis was reported to be an important event in society. The couple only returned to Saint Petersburg in 1854. After the coronation of Alexander II, they visited Paris, where Franz Xaver Winterhalter made a portrait of her. In 1859, her husband was appointed as vice-president of the Academy of Arts, the family lived in an apartment located in the academy building. When the couple received guests, they were noted for their friendliness and hospitality. The Emperor maintained close relationships with the Gagarins, and repeatedly proved his favour to them. In 1871, he granted Sofia Andreevna the Order of Saint Catherine (lesser cross). She was also an assistant trustee in the orphanage founded in the memory of Tsarevich Nikolai Alexandrovich, and served under the Empress as a lecturer, and was listed alongside her husband as an honorary member of the Academy of Arts. Supporting her husband in all his endeavors, Sofia Andreevna traveled with him a lot to Italy, France and Germany. They visited Cairo, Athens and Constantinople, but preferred to spend almost every summer at their favorite estate in Karacharovo, Tver. Archbishop Savva, who visited the Gagarins at the estate in the 1880s, recalled that both spouses were remarkable:

"The prince, not without difficulty, could communicate in Russian; in a conversation with him, one could see more of a foreigner than a Russian. The princess was undoubtedly an intelligent, educated and religious person; One thing I didn’t really like about her was her ardent devotion to the famous sectarian Pashkov."

After the death of her husband in Chatellerault, 1893, Princess Gagarina lived in St. Petersburg and was highly respected in society. In May 1896, during the coronation of Emperor Nikolai II, she was made a lady of state. Having carefully stored all the artistic material left after the death of her husband, as well as his library, she donated it in 1898 to the newly opened Russian Museum of Emperor Alexander III. She died in 1908 in Saint Petersburg. According to her will, she was buried next to her husband in the family necropolis on the Karacharovo estate in Tver province.

== Family ==
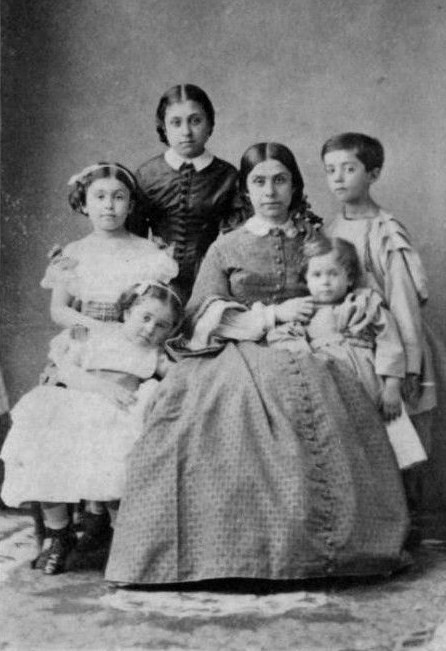
Sofia Andreevna Gagarina with her children: Ekaterina (1845-1920), Maria (1851-1941), Anastasia (1853-1876), Grigori (1850-1918) and Andrei (1856-1920).

From her husbands first marriage to Princess Anna Nikolaevna Dolgorukova (1821-1845) Gagarin had one daughter:

- Ekaterina Grigorievna (1845-1920), married Pavel Sergeevich Mukhanov (1840-1913) in 1871

Though, not her biological child, Sofia Andreevna loved and raised Ekaterina (nicknamed 'Rita') as her own daughter. In addition to her stepdaughter, Sofia had six children:

- Grigori (1850-1918), served in the Ministry of Agriculture, married Maria Alexandrovna Galitzine (1855-1930), and had issue
- Maria (14 June 1851 Tiflis - 2 August 1941, Cannes), maid of honour, married Mikhail Nikolaievich Raievsky (1841–1893) and had issue including Irina Mikhailovna, the morganatic wife of George, Duke of Mecklenburg
- Anastasia (1853-1876), married Pierre Mikhailovitch Orlov-Denissov (1852-1881) on 9 November 1875, and had issue
- Andrei (1856-1920), godchild of Dowager Empress Alexandra Feodorovna, first director of the St. Petersburg Polytechnic Institute, married Maria Dimitrievna Obolenksy (1864-1946), and had issue
- Alexandre (1858, Paris-1864), godson of the Emperor and Grand Duchess Maria Nikolaevna
- Nina (1861-1861)
