= Ekaterina Adlerberg =

Russian lady-in-waiting (1821–1910)

Ekaterina Nikolaevna Adlerberg
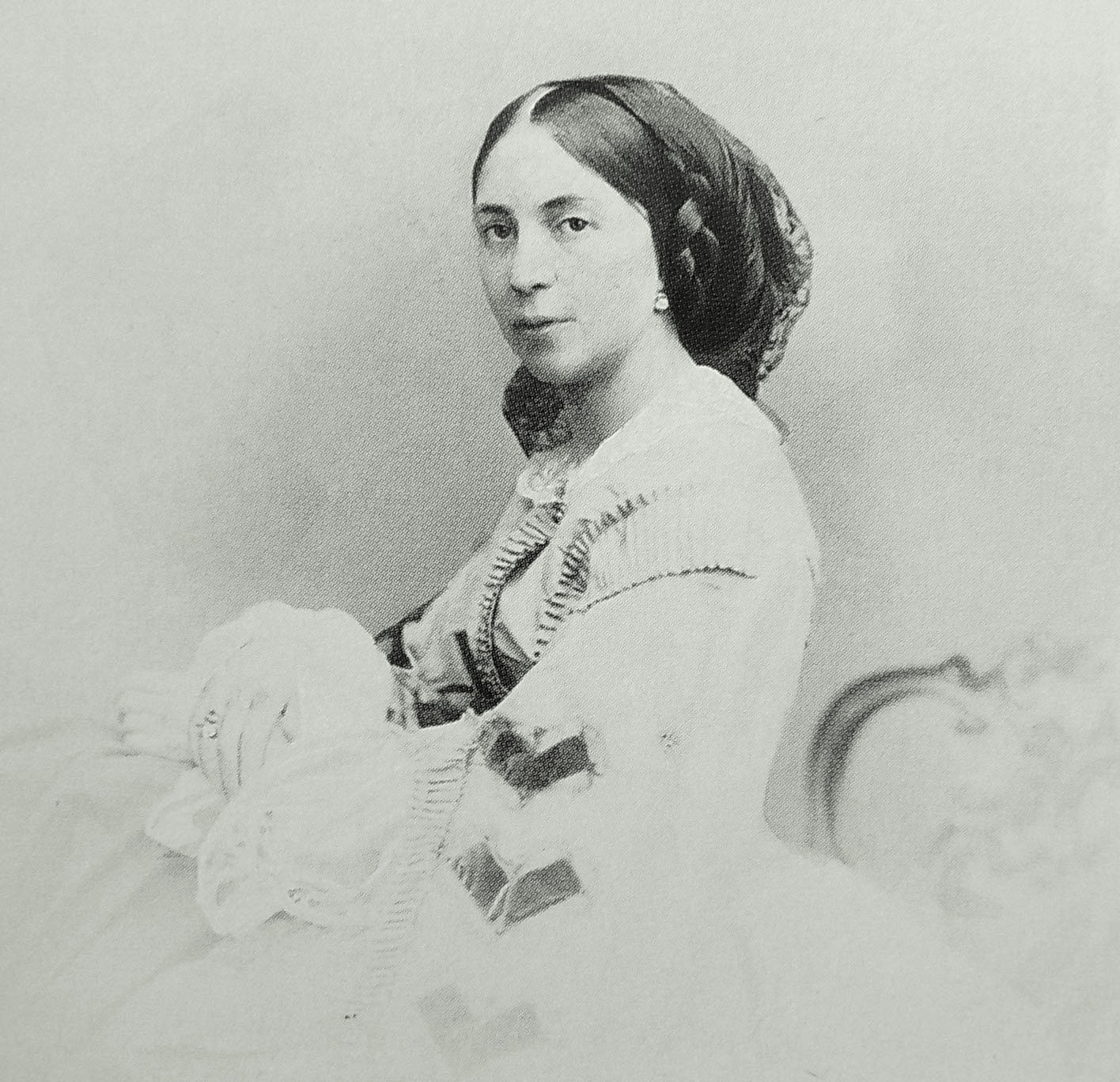
- Born: Ekaterina Nikolaevna Poltavtseva; 2 September 1821; Saltykovo, Tambov Governorate, Russian Empire
- Died: 16 June 1910 (aged 88); Tsarskoye Selo, Saint Petersburg, Russian Empire
- Noble family: Adlerberg
- Spouse: Alexander Vladimirovich Adlerberg
- Issue: Nikolai Alexandrovich Adlerberg; Maria Alexandrovna Adlerberg
- Father: Nikolai Petrovich Poltavtsev
- Mother: Daria Alekseevna Pashkova

Countess Ekaterina Nikolaevna Adlerberg (Russian: Екатери́на Никола́евна А́длерберг) nee Poltavtseva (Russian: Полта́вцева; 2 September [O.S. 21 August] 1821, Saltykovo, Tambov Governorate, Russian Empire – 16 June [O.S. 3 June] 1910, Tsarskoye Selo) was a maid of honour, state lady, dame of the Order of Saint Catherine, and of the Order of the Red Cross.

== Biography ==
Ekaterina Nikolaevna was the daughter of pomeshchik, guard ensign Nikolai Petrovich Poltavtsev (1769–1849) and Daria Alexeevna Pashkova (1798–1842), owner of the Pashkov House. On her father's side, she was a descendant of Ignatius Poltavtsev, a court singer who was ennobled by Empress Elizabeth.

The Poltavtsevs had six daughters and four sons. Natalia (1815–1896), was distinguished by an original life style and was not married, Elizabeth (1816–1866), married Adjutant General Nikolai Trofimovich Baranov, Zinaida (1819–1854), died of consumption in Rome unmarried. The youngest three daughters were raised at the Smolny Institute. In 1842, the second youngest, Olga (1823–1880) left the institute and soon married Dmitri Skobelev. In 1845, the youngest, Anna (1825–1904), received a code upon graduation and later married the master of ceremonies Andrei Zherebtsov.

All of the children were born and raised on their father's estate in the village of Saltykovo. In 18330, they moved to the Bolshoye Gagarino estate. At the end of 1833, Daria Alekseevna and her children moved to Moscow, where she was 'received very coldly in society and treated very condescendingly'. In 1836, she moved again with her family to Saint Petersburg, where she enrolled her daughters in the Smolny Institute.

Ekaterina Nikolaevn graduated from the institute in 1839 and on 15 March of the same year, she was accepted as a maid of honour to the court of Grand Duchess Maria Nikolaevna. Her sister Elizabeth, a cunning woman, managed to arrange a very profitable match for Ekaterina, her husband's cousin, Count Alexander Vladimirovich Adlerberg (1818–1888), the closest friend of Tsarevich Alexander. Their wedding took place on 17 July 1842, in the Church of Saints Peter and Paul in Petergof.

The house of the Countess (or 'Katish' as she was called by those around her) was renowned in Saint Petersburg. A great lover of music, on Tuesdays during the winter season, she hosted musical evenings and receptions attended by singers and musicians who were visiting the capital. The countess herself performed romances and folk songs. According to Anna Tyutcheva, 'she became a different person when she sang, her whole being was transformed; from vulgar and cutesy, she became graceful and spiritual'.

As a member of the intimate circle of Alexander II, on the occasion of his 25th wedding anniversary, Countess Adlerberg was made a dame of the Order of Saint Catherine (lesser cross), and on 22 July of the same year, her daughter, Maria, was granted the position of maid of honour. In 1872, Ekaterina Nikolaevna received the title of state lady.

The Adlerberg couple lived widely and their affairs were always complicated. Alexander II repeatedly paid off his friend's large debts. Under Alexander III in August 1881, Count Adlerberg was dismissed. Though the emperor chose to pay his colossal debt to the tune of more than 1,200,000 rubles. Having lost her position at court, Countess Ekaterina Nikolaevna openly expressed her dissatisfaction and made comments about the ingratitude of the sovereign. She tried to gather opposition to the new reign, but failed. When her nephew, General Mikhail Skobelev was recalled to Saint Petersburg after his Paris speech, the Countess defiantly arrived to meet him at the station with a huge bouquet of flowers, which further alienated society.

After the death of her husband in 1888, Countess Adlerberg wanted to retain ownership of the state house of the Minister of the Imperial Court and the salary awarded to her husband (76,000 rubles per annum), but the Emperor refused, since she had her own funds. According to one of the friends of Alexander III (Illarion Vorontsov-Dashkov), Countes Adlerberg 'kept 450 thousand rubles in the cash register of the Ministry of the Court and made a fortune for herself from various kinds of dark scams'. After leaving the court, Ekaterina Nikolaevna settled in Tsarskoye Selo, where she died of pneumonia on 3 June 1910. She was buried next to her husband in the Coastal Monastery of Saint Sergius.

== Marriage and issue ==
From Ekaterina Nikolaevna's marriage to Count Alexander Vladimirovich Adlerberg (1818–1888) she had five children:

- Alexander (1843–1849)
- Nikolai (1844–1904), major general, director of the department of general affairs of the Ministry of State.
- Vladimir (1846–), chamberlain, minister of the imperial court, married a Kurdish woman, which was not recognised in Russia.
- Maria (1849–1892), maid of honour, married Niko I Dadiani, Prince of Mingrelia in 1874.
- Alexandra (1852–1855)
