= Maria Vasilyevna Kochubey =

Russian noble

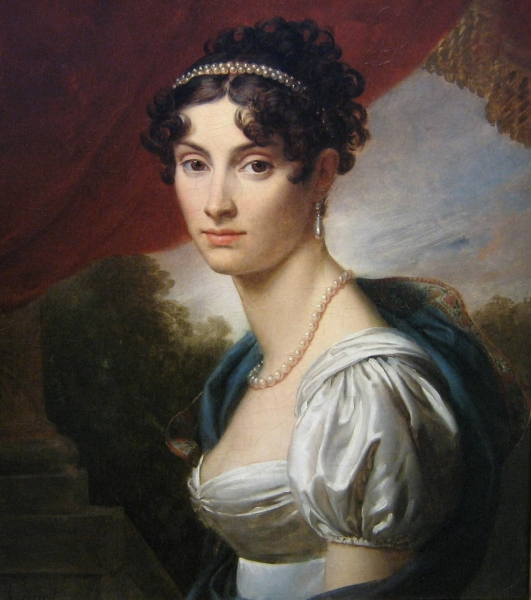
- 1809 portrait by François Gérard
- Native name: Мария Васильевна Кочубей
- Born: Maria Vasilyevna Vasilchikova; 10 September 1779; Moscow, Russian Empire
- Died: 12 January 1884 (aged 104); Paris, France
- Noble family: Vasilchikova
- Spouse: Viktor Kochubey
- Issue: Natalia Viktorovna Kochubey; Lev Viktorovich Kochubey; Vasily Viktorovich Kochubey; Mikhail Viktorovich Kochubey; Sergey Viktorovich Kochubey
- Father: Vasily Semyonovich Vasilchikov
- Mother: Anna Kirillovna Razumovskaya

Princess Maria Vasilyevna Kochubey (Russian: Мари́я Васи́льевна Кочубе́й, née Vasilchikova, Russian: Васи́льчикова; 10 September 1779 – 12 January 1844) was a lady-in-waiting, dame of the Order of Saint Catherine, and the wife of Russian statesman Viktor Kochubey.

== Early life ==
Maria Vasilyevna was the daughter of chaimberlain Vasily Semenovich Vasilchikov (1743-1808), who was the brother of Alexander Vasilchikov, one of Catherine the Great's favourites, and of Countess Anna Kirillovna Razumovskaya (1754-1826), a maid of honour, herself the daughter of Kirill Razumovsky, the last Hetman of the Zaporozhian Host.

She was born on 10 September 1779 in Moscow, and was baptised three days later in the Church of St. Nicholas the Wonderworker in Zvonari in the presence of her uncle Count Alexey Razumovsky, and aunt Countess Praskovya Raxumovskaya.

Almost immediately after her birth, she was taken to Saint Petersburg by her aunt Natalia Zagryazhskaya, without permission, who had no children of her own. Her parents tried to get their daughter back into their custody, but Zagryazhskaya announced if the left Maria with her, she would make the child her sole heir.

== Marriage ==
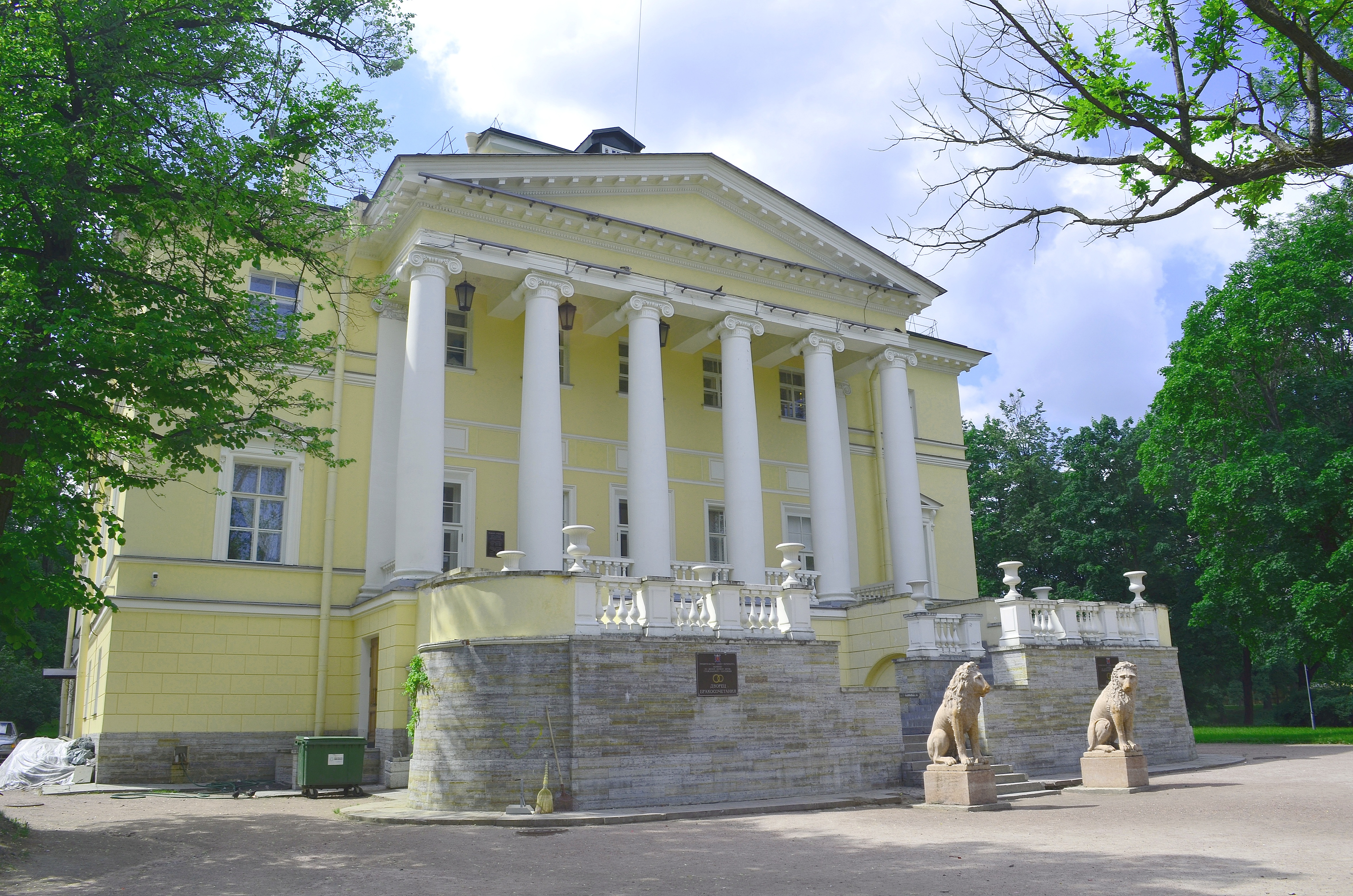
Maria Kochubey's dacha in Tsarkoye Selo

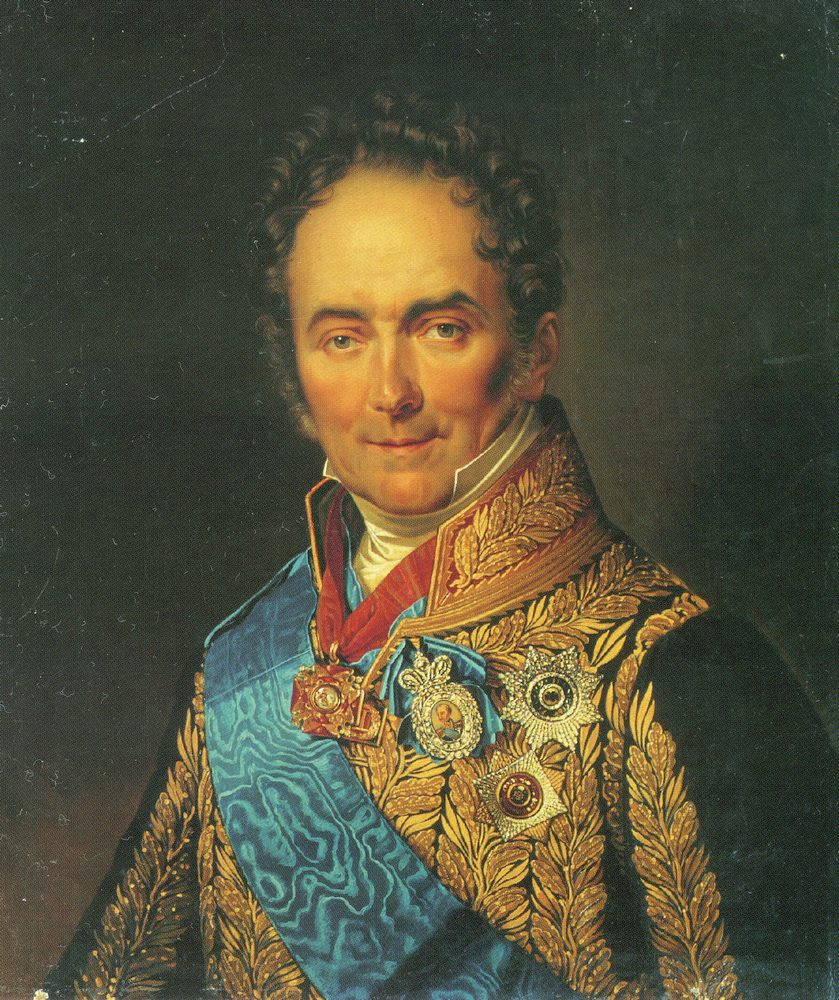
Viktor Kokhubey c. 1832

In September of 1799, Count Viktor Kochubey, a favourite of Paul I Proposed to Maria Vasilyevna. According to family tradition, the proposal was sudden and was caused by Kochubey's guess that the Emperor intended to marry him to his mistress, Anna Lopukhina. On the occasion, Count Pyotr Zavadovsky wrote to his friend Count Semyon Vorontsov:

"There has long been talk of Kochubei's marriage; and yesterday I was told that permission from the court has already been given, according to the report, he has not yet revealed a word to me about his intentions; and I did not think to interrogate him about what he was hiding. In love affairs he has always been a fickle fellow, and finally he has collapsed. Not only at his age, but also in his later century, a man falls into such a trap. Consequently, there is nothing surprising here."

The wedding took place on 13 November 1799 in the Church of Simeon and Anna, Saint Petersburg. The sponsor of the groom was Nikolai Zagryazhsky and for the bride, Count Lev Razumovsky and Count Pytor Razumovsky.

The newlyweds fell into disfavour following the wedding and immediately left for Dykanka, and the Dresden. Following the ascencion of Alexander I, Viktor returned to Saint Petersburg, soon followed by his wife who had recently given birth to a daughter. Natalia Zagryazhskaya settled with them and did not leave the side of her beloved niece until her death in 1837. Her husband's career and close relationship with the emperor enabled Maria Vasilyevna to occupy an enviable position within court and society. On 22 July 1804, Maria Kochubey was made a Dame of the Order of Saint Catherine, and on 22 August, 1826, she was made a state lady. In 1831, Vasily Pavlovich was elevated to the rank of prince. On 15 April 1841, Maria Vasilyevna received the Order of Saint Catherine 1st class.

During 1817 and 1818, the family lived in Paris. Upon their return to Russia, they settled in Tsarskoye Selo in a new dacha where they were often visited by Emperor Alexander I and his successor Nicholas I. Alexander Pushkin was also a frequent guest at their Saint Petersburg dacha on the banks of the Fontanka.

Mikhail Speransky, who was a close friend of the couple, described Maria Vasilyevna in a letter to his daughter in 1818 as "the most beautiful moral female creature that I have ever seen". Dolly Ficquelmont found her "sweet and charming, at the same time very lively, very witty and able to express her thoughts in a charming manner".

== Widowhood and Later Life ==
Having become a widow in 1834, Maria Vasilyevna was forced to sell her dacha to pay off her debts. Residing in Saint Petersburg during the winter, she maintained the brilliant receptions she established during her husband's lifetime. She spent her summers in her estate in Dykanka, sometimes traveling abroad. At her estate, the widowed princess was;

"held by the queen; however, she was not the only one - in those days, many of the noble ladies of the newly granted families loved, as the French say, jouer la reine in their estates. At the litanies, following the imperial family and the name of the local bishop, the priest prayed for the princess with her children and for the deceased prince. At receptions, dinners, and even when apart from the family and household, no one was there, everyone gathered in one of the drawing rooms in anticipation of the princess, and only a few minutes later she appeared, accompanied by two or three hangers-on; this somewhat resembled an exit, but did not seem funny, because the luxury of Dikanka corresponded to this."

During one of her trips abroad, Princess Kochubey died. Her death certificate states that she was buried in the Montmartre Cemetery. Her remains were later transported to Saint Petersburg where she was buried in the Church of the Holy Spirit, within the Alexander Nevsky Lavra.

== Issue ==
Maria Vasilyevna and Prince Viktor Pavlovich Kochubey had thirteen children, eight of whom died in childhood:

- Natalia Viktorovna (1800-1855), muse of Pushkin, married Count Alexander Stroganov (1795-1879)
- Alexander Viktorovich (1802-1808)
- Pavel Victorovich (21 October 1803 - 29 March 1807), baptised in the Simeonovskaya Church on Mokhovaya, godson of Count Ilya Bezborodko and Countess E. K. Apraksina.
- Nikolai Viktorovich (1805 - 11 March 1811), died of measles.
- Andrei Viktorovich (1 April 1907 - 23 May 1816) baptised in the Simeonovskaya Church on Mokhovaya, godson of N. A. Vasilchikov and N. K. Zagryazhskaya, died of tuberculosis.
- Ekaterina Viktorovna (1808-1809)
- Elizaveta Viktorovna (1809-1809)
- Lev Viktorovich (1810-1890), actual state councilor, married the composer Elizaveta Vasilevna Kochubey.
- Elena Viktorovna (1811-1811)
- Vasily Victorovich (1812-1850), chamberlain, actual state councilor, and archaeologist. Married the widowed Princess Elena Pavlovna Beloselskaya, née Bibikova (1812-1888), the step-daughter of Alexander von Benckendorff.
- Anna Viktorovna (30 September 1813 - 16 March 1827), died of tuberculosis, buried in the Alexander Nevsky Larva.
- Mikhail Viktorovich (1816-1874), court marshal, married Princess Marya Ivanovna Baryatinskaya (1818-1843), daughter of Prince Ivan Ivanovich Baryatinsky.
- Sergei Viktorovich (1820-1880), actual state councilor, married Sofya Alexandrovna Demidova, née Countess Benckendorff (1825-1875), daughter of Alexander von Benckendorff.
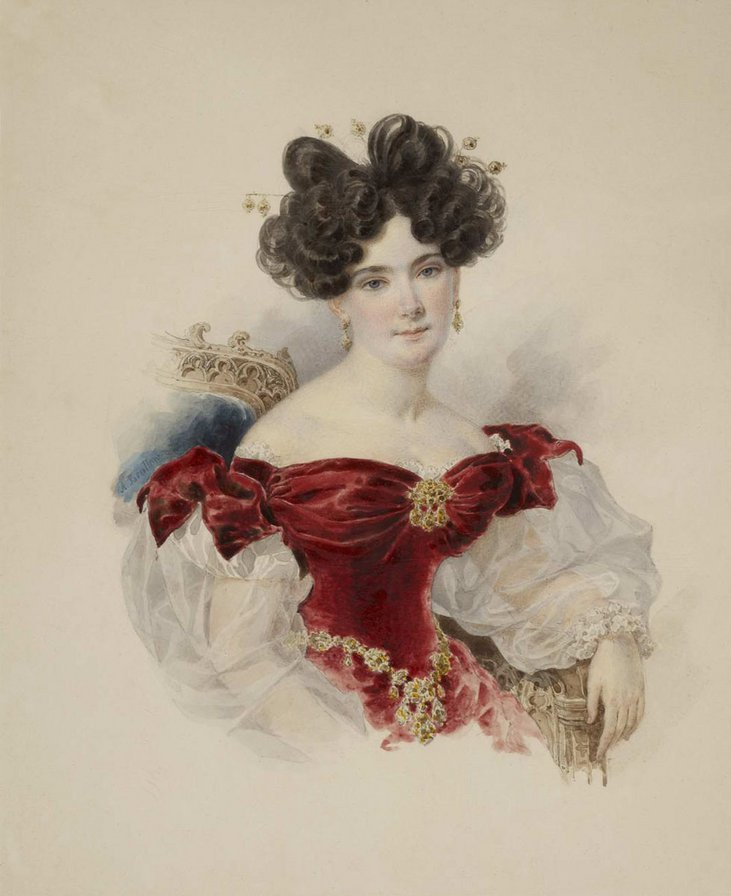
Natalia Viktorovna

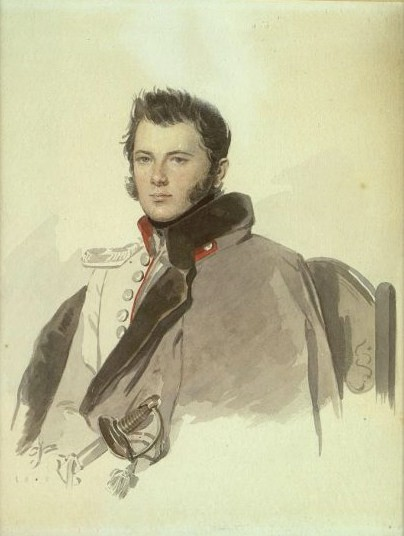
Lev Viktorovich

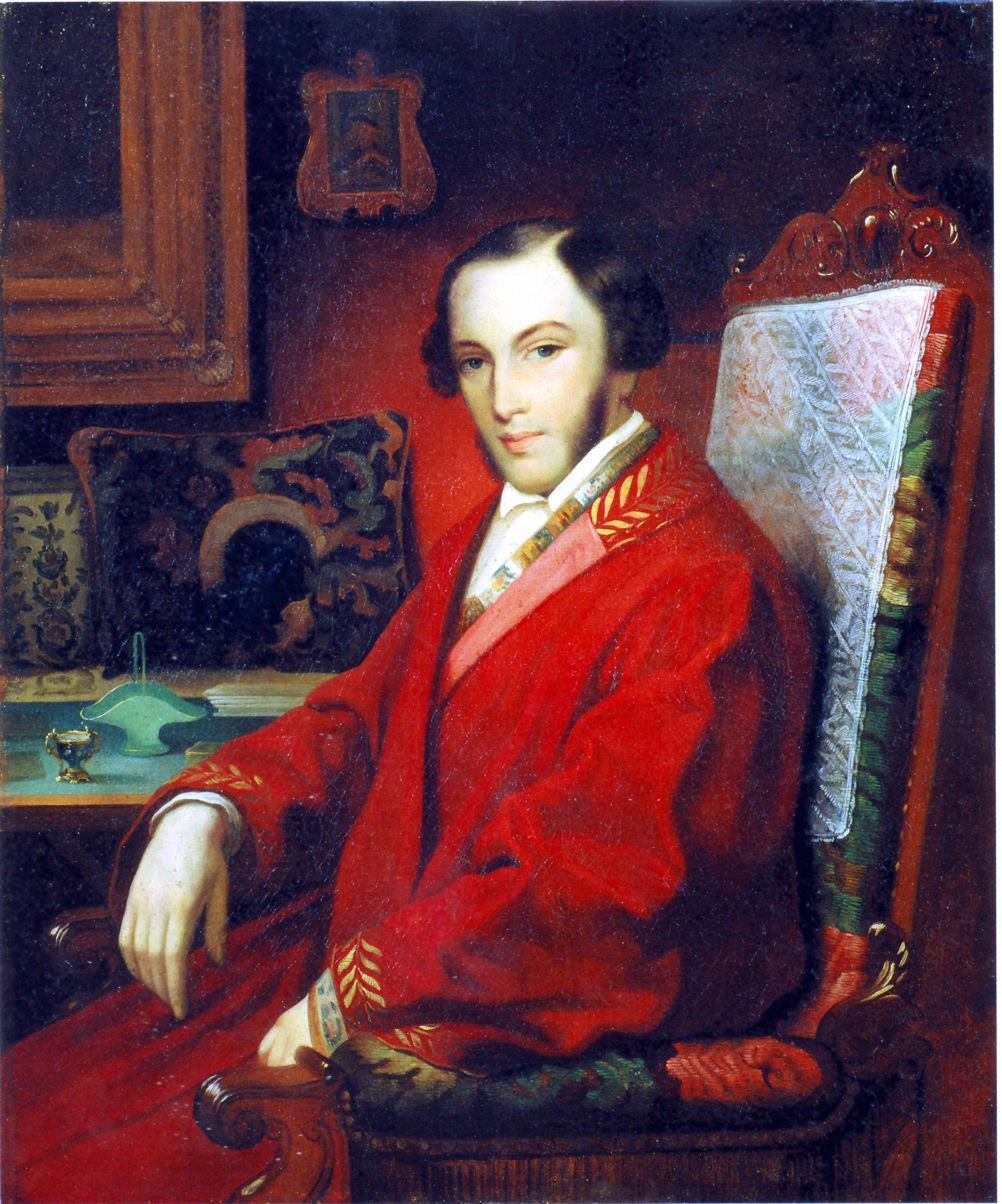
Vasily Viktorovich

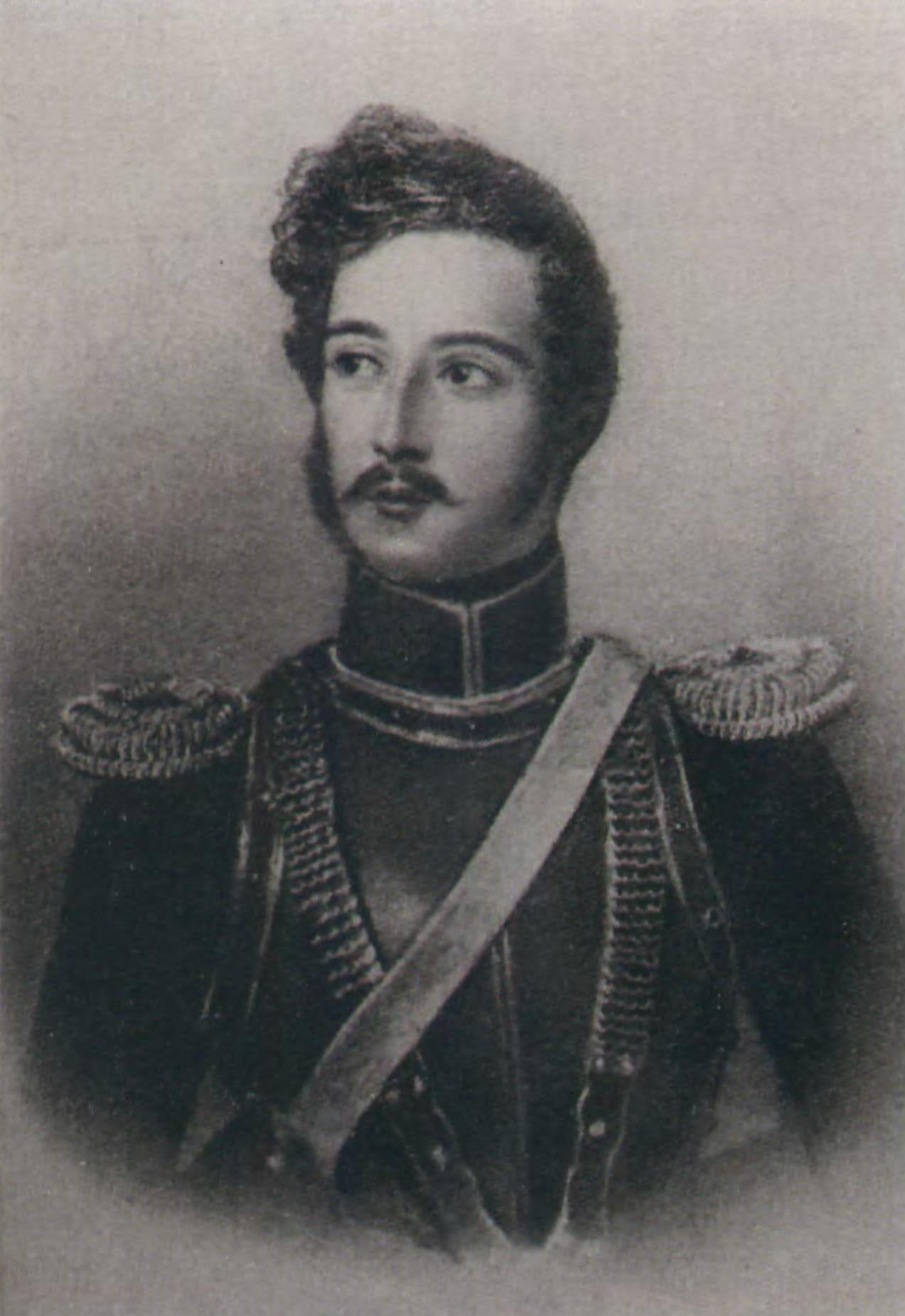
Mikhail Viktorovich
