= Ekaterina Alexandrovna Golovkina =

Russian countess

Ekaterina Alexandrova Golovkina
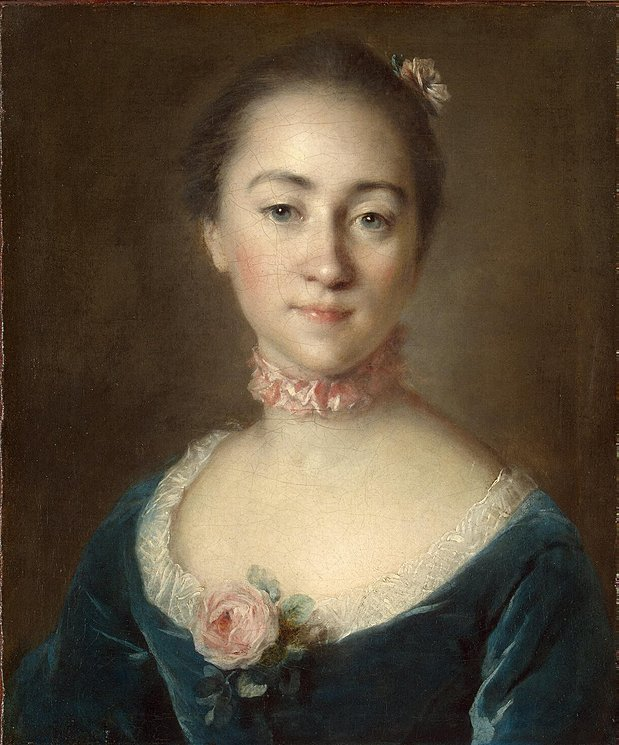
- Portrait by Louis Tocqué (1757)
- Born: Ekaterina Alexandrova Shuvalova; 1733; Moscow, Russian Empire
- Died: 1821 (aged 87–88); Paris, France
- Noble family: Shuvalov
- Spouse: Count Gavrila Ivanovich Golovkin
- Issue: Alexey Gavrilovich; Elizaveta Gavrilovna
- Father: Alexander Ivanovich Shuvalov
- Mother: Ekaterina Ivanovna Kostyurina

Countess Ekaterina Alexandrovna Golovkina (Russian: Екатери́на Алекса́ндровна Голо́вкина; nee Countess Shuvalova, Russian: Шува́лова; 1733 - 1821) was a prominent landowner who had influence at the court of Empress Elizabeth, niece of Ivan Shuvalov, and state lady.

== Biography ==
Ekaterina was the only daughter of Count Alexander Ivanovich Shuvalov (1710-1771), field marshal general and head of the “ secret chancellery ”, and Ekaterina Ivanovna Kostyurina (1718-1790).

During the arrival of the court in Moscow, on 24 November 1749, Ekaterina Alexandrovna was betrothed to Count Gavrila Ivanovich Golovkin (d. 1787), a court marshal under Grand Duke Peter Fedorovich, later, active privy councilor. Empress Elizabeth personally exchanged rings for the newlyweds and drank to their health with the entire court. Ekaterina Alexandrovna's groom was the grandson of his namesake, the count and founder of the family, Gavriil Golovkin.

On 14 October, 1750, their wedding took place in the court church in St. Petersburg, in the presence of the empress and the court. The wedding celebration took place in the house of the marshal, Prince N. Yu. Trubetskoy. The Empress and her entire court arrived at the 11th hour and attended the ball and dinner, the celebrations continued the next day. Empress Catherine II, who did not like Countess Golovkina, and was rather unkind to her husband’s parents, recalled that she often laughed at her and her husband:

"They always had the most pitiful hats and cuffs, in which the desire to save a penny was always visible in something. Although these were very rich people and not constrained by their means, they by nature loved everything small and narrow, a true reflection of their soul."

On the occasion of Alexander I's coronation, the Countess Golovkina (by then widowed) was granted a state lady and bestowed with the Order of Saint Catherine (lesser cross). From 1802 to 1816, she lived in Geneva, and then in Paris.In 1812, the 79 year old countess provided eighteen soldiers to the militia from Agafitov, Alekseevskaya and Aksinina, to fight against the French invasion of Russia.

According to a report from the Russian ambassador to France, Lieutenant General Pozzo di Borgo, Countess Ekaterina Golovkina could not manage her affairs due to her age and poor health, thus a guardianship was created over her in 1820. The trustees were her son, Alexei Gavrilovich, Privy Councillor Engel, and the third was elected by the Adjutant General, Count Pavel Shuvalov and the Council of Guardians of the young children of the late Lieutenant General, Count Pyotr Shuvalov. The trusteeship was created for the life of the countess.

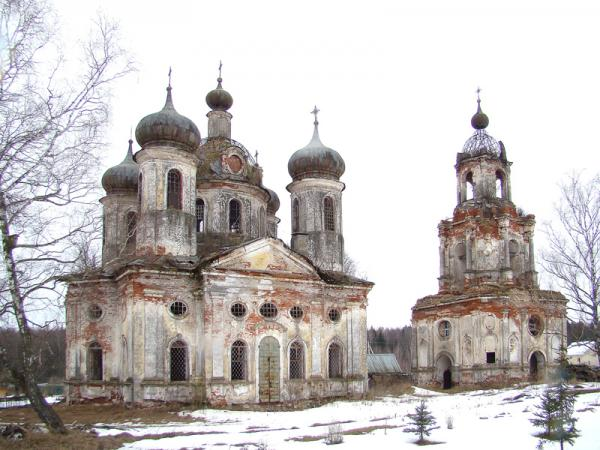
Church of the Transfiguration of the Lord in Spas-Kositsy

She died in 1821 at the age of 88 in Paris. Her ashes were transported to Russia and buried in the family tomb with her parents, near the Church of the Transfiguration, Chapel of Metropolitan Alexei, Spas-Kositsy. Her name is inscribed in the eternal commemoration of the Nikolo-Berlyukovskaya Monastery.

== Issue ==
- Alexei Gavrilovich (d. 1832), Valet de chambre of the court from 1775 to 1786. He inherited the village of Mikhailovskoye from his father. He became known for his art collection and often travelled abroad in search of new paintings. One of his museums burned down during the capture of Moscow by the French in 1812. He died unmarried and childless in poverty, having spent almost the entire family fortune of paintings, minerals, and sculptures.
- Elizaveta Gavrilovna (22 October 1752 - 21 May 1820), was a maid of honour, and was nicknamed "Migusha", due to a nervous tic causing her to blink often. She was bethrothed to Prince Alexander Borisovich Kurakin, but objected due to having no desire to marry. In 1784, she inherited the village of Kurovo, Pushinsky District, Moscow region, that no longer exists. She died on her way to Königsberg and was buried in the necropolis of the Coastal Monastery of Saint Sergius.
