= Mary Hamilton (lady-in-waiting) =

Russian lady-in-waiting (died 1719)

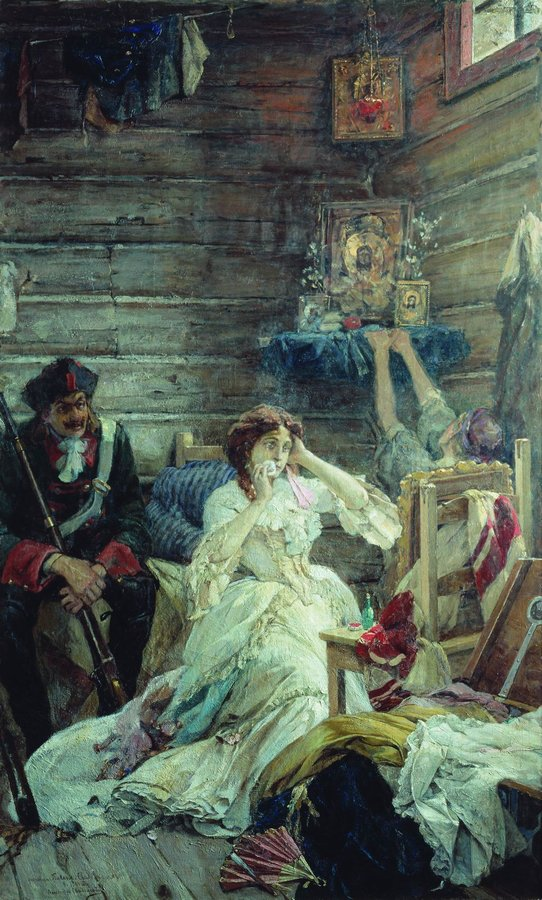
- Mary Hamilton awaiting execution, painting by Pavel Svedomsky (1904)
- Known for: Mistress of Peter the Great
- Died: 14 March 1719; Saint Petersburg, Russia
- Cause of death: Execution by decapitation
- Noble family: Clan Hamilton
- Father: William Hamilton
- Occupation: Lady-in-waiting to Catherine Alekseyevna

Mary Hamilton or Maria Danilovna Gamontova (Russian: Мария Даниловна Гамонтова; died 14 March 1719) was a Russian lady-in-waiting to Catherine Alekseyevna and a mistress of Tsar Peter the Great. She was executed for abortion, infanticide, theft, and slander against Catherine. She is considered one of the possible inspirations for the song "Mary Hamilton".

== Life ==
The execution of Maria Hamilton by Daniel Chodowiecki (1793)

Mary Hamilton was a member of the Scottish family Hamilton, whose ancestor Thomas Hamilton had emigrated to Russia during the reign of Tsar Ivan the Terrible, and was probably the daughter of William Hamilton, as well as the cousin of Yevdokiya Grigorieyvna Hamilton. She became lady-in-waiting to Empress Catherine in 1713, arousing attention with her beauty and love life, and became the lover of Peter the Great. She also had a lover, Ivan Mikhailovich Orlov. When Orlov betrayed her with Peter's other lover, Avdotya Chernysheva, she tried to win him back by giving him items stolen from Catherine.

She had an abortion in 1715 by taking medicine for constipation, and gave birth to another child secretly in 1717, after which she drowned the baby.

In 1717, Orlov was interrogated about some of Peter's missing documents. He confessed his relationship with Hamilton and accused her of having an abortion. Avdotya Chernysheva accused Hamilton of spreading the rumour that Catherine ate wax to keep her skin pale. When Catherine had Hamilton's room searched, several stolen objects belonging to Catherine were found there. Hamilton and Orlov were both arrested and imprisoned in the Fortress of Saint Petersburg. Mary Hamilton confessed to theft and to killing her newborn infant, but refused to testify against Orlov despite torture.

In November 1718, Mary Hamilton was found guilty of abortion, murder of her infant, and theft of jewelry belonging to the Empress; she was sentenced to death. Both Empress Catherine and Tsarina Praskovia Saltykova asked Peter for mercy on her account but without result. She was executed on Trinity Square, dressed in white, by decapitation on 14 March 1719. She was decapitated by sword instead of an axe, as Peter had promised her that the executioner would not be allowed to touch her. After the execution, the tsar took up the head, gave a lecture about its anatomy, kissed it, and then threw it away.

Some sources speculated that the head of Mary Hamilton after her execution was preserved at the Russian Academy of Science at least until the reign of Catherine the Great.

== Sources ==
- "Гамильтон, Мария Даниловна" . Brockhaus and Efron Encyclopedic Dictionary (in Russian). 1906.
- Гамильтон, Мария Даниловна // Энциклопедический словарь Брокгауза и Ефрона: В 86 томах (82 т. и 4 доп.). — СПб., 1890–1907.
- Карл Задлер. Опыт исторического оправдания Петра I против обвинений некоторых современных писателей. СПб, 1861 (Дело фрейлины Гамильтон, с. 1-22).
- М. И. Семевский, "Камер-фрейлина Мария Даниловна Гамильтон" // "Слово и дело (1700—1725). Очерки и рассказы из русской истории XVIII в." (Санкт-Петербург, 1884), с. 185–268; тот же очерк // "Отечественные записки" (1860, т. CXXXII, No. 9, с. 239–310).
