= Avdotya Chernysheva =

Russian noble and lady-in-waiting (1693–1747)

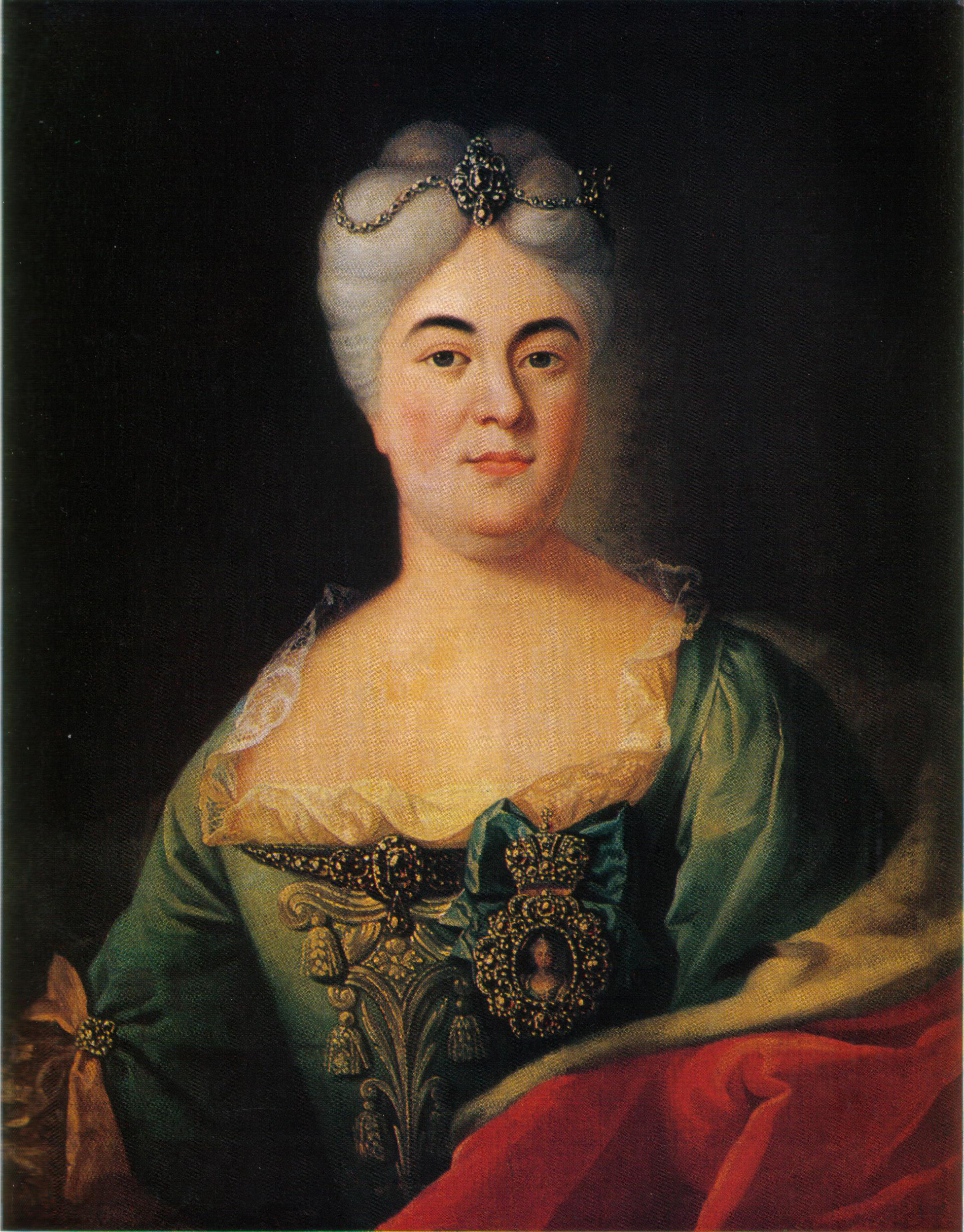
Portrait

Avdotya (Yevdokiya) Ivanovna Chernysheva (Russian: Авдотья Ивановна Чернышева; née Rzhevskaya; February 12, 1693 – June 17, 1747) was a Russian noblewoman and lady-in-waiting. She was a royal mistress of Peter the Great.

== Life ==
She was the daughter of Prince Ivan Ivanovitch Rzhevsky and Daria Gavrilovna, and in 1710, she married Prince Grigory Chernyshev (1672–1745).

Her relationship with Russian tsar Peter the Great continued on and off from 1708 until his death in 1725. In 1717, she was involved in the fall of her rival Mary Hamilton. It is rumored that Peter died of syphilis after having been infected by Chernysheva, but there is nothing to indicate that she was herself ill. She was a state lady of Empress Anna of Russia from 1730 to 1745.

== Sources ==
- Еловский, Б. (1905). Русский биографический словарь. Т. 22: Чаадаев — Швитков. Русский биографический словарь. pp. 279–280.
