= Sofya Shcherbatova =

Russian philanthropist

Sofiya Stepanovna Shcherbatova
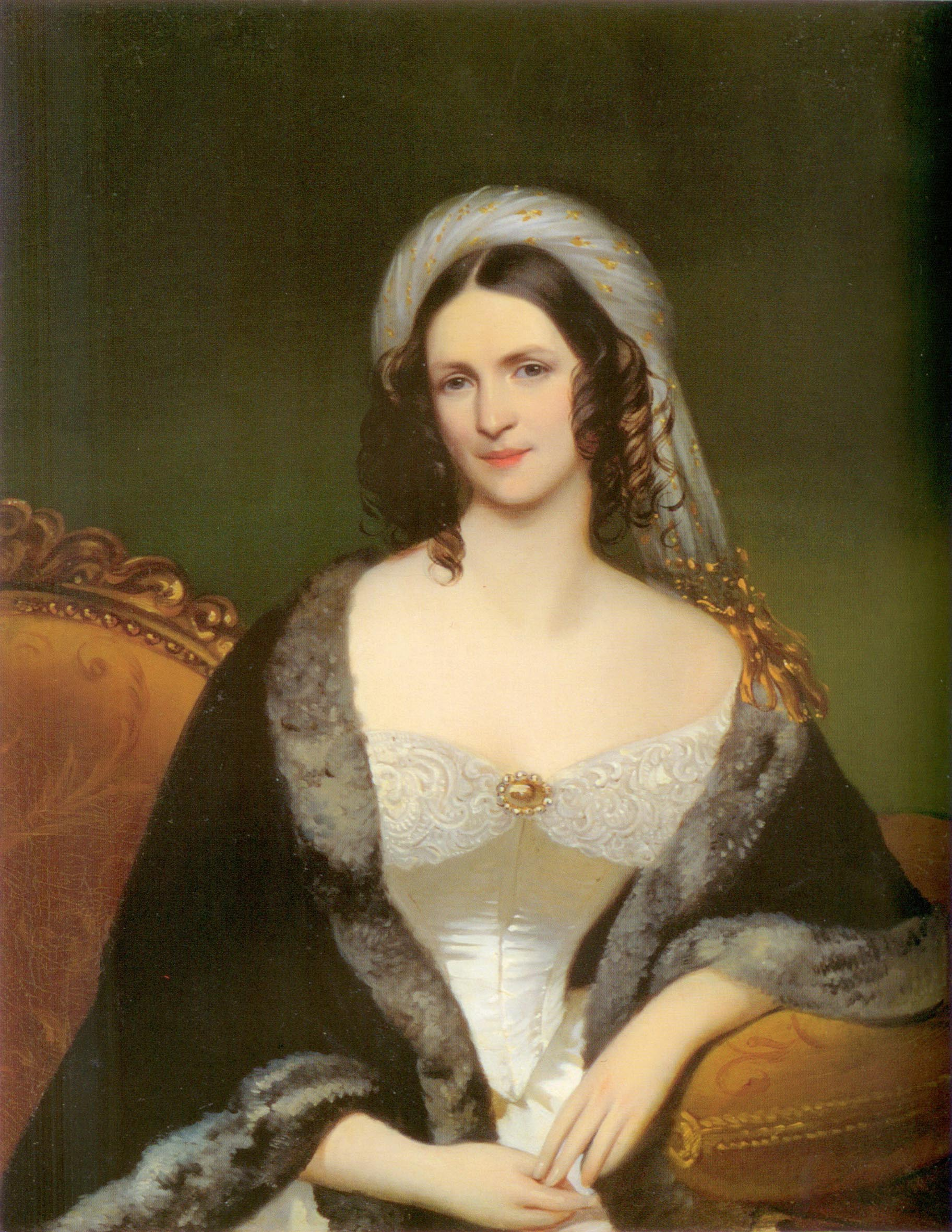
- Princess Shcherbatova in 1841
- Born: Sofiya Stepanovna Apraksina; София Степановна Апраксина; 6 December 1798; Moscow, Russian Empire
- Died: 3 February 1885 (aged 86); Moscow, Russian Empire
- Occupations: philanthropist charity organizer
- Years active: 1820s – 1880s
- Spouse: Prince Alexey Shcerbatov

Princess Sofiya Stepanovna Shcherbatova (Russian: Софи́я Степа́новна Щерба́това, née Apraksina, Russian: Апра́ксина; 1798 in Moscow, Russian Empire – 3 February 1885 in Moscow) was a prominent Russian philanthropist, the Dame Chevalier of the Order of Saint Catherine (1822). Princess Shcherbatova (since 1817, when she married Prince Alexey Shcherbatov) was the founder of The Grand Dames Helping the Poor charity (Damskoye Popetchitelstvo o Bednykh, 1844) which she remained the chairman of till 1876, the Nikolskaya Community (which proved particularly effective during the cholera epidemic in 1848 in Moscow and later during the Crimean War), many orphanages and shelters for homeless and elderly people. An heir to the famous Apraksin family, she was greatly interested in literature and arts, kept a fashionable Moscow salon and was a friend of Alexander Pushkin, Pyotr Vyazemsky and Mikhail Lermontov, among others.
