= Lady-in-waiting of the Imperial Court of Russia =

Lady-in-waiting in the Russian Empire

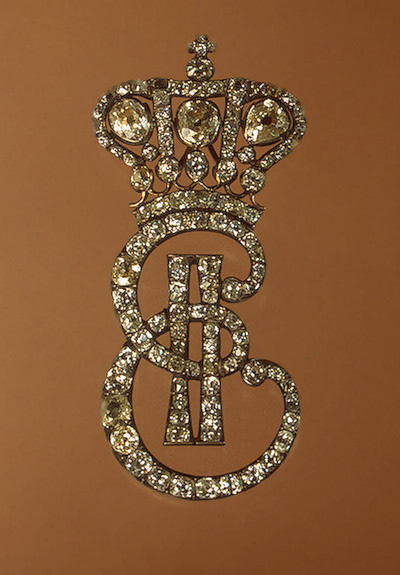
Catherine II's initials diamond pin worn by a Maid of Honour

A lady-in-waiting of the Imperial Russian Court (придворные дамы) was a woman of high aristocracy at the service of a woman of the Imperial family. They were organised according to the strict hierarchy of Peter the Great's table of ranks, following the woman's chin (rank) established on January 24, 1722.

== Definition and table of ranks ==
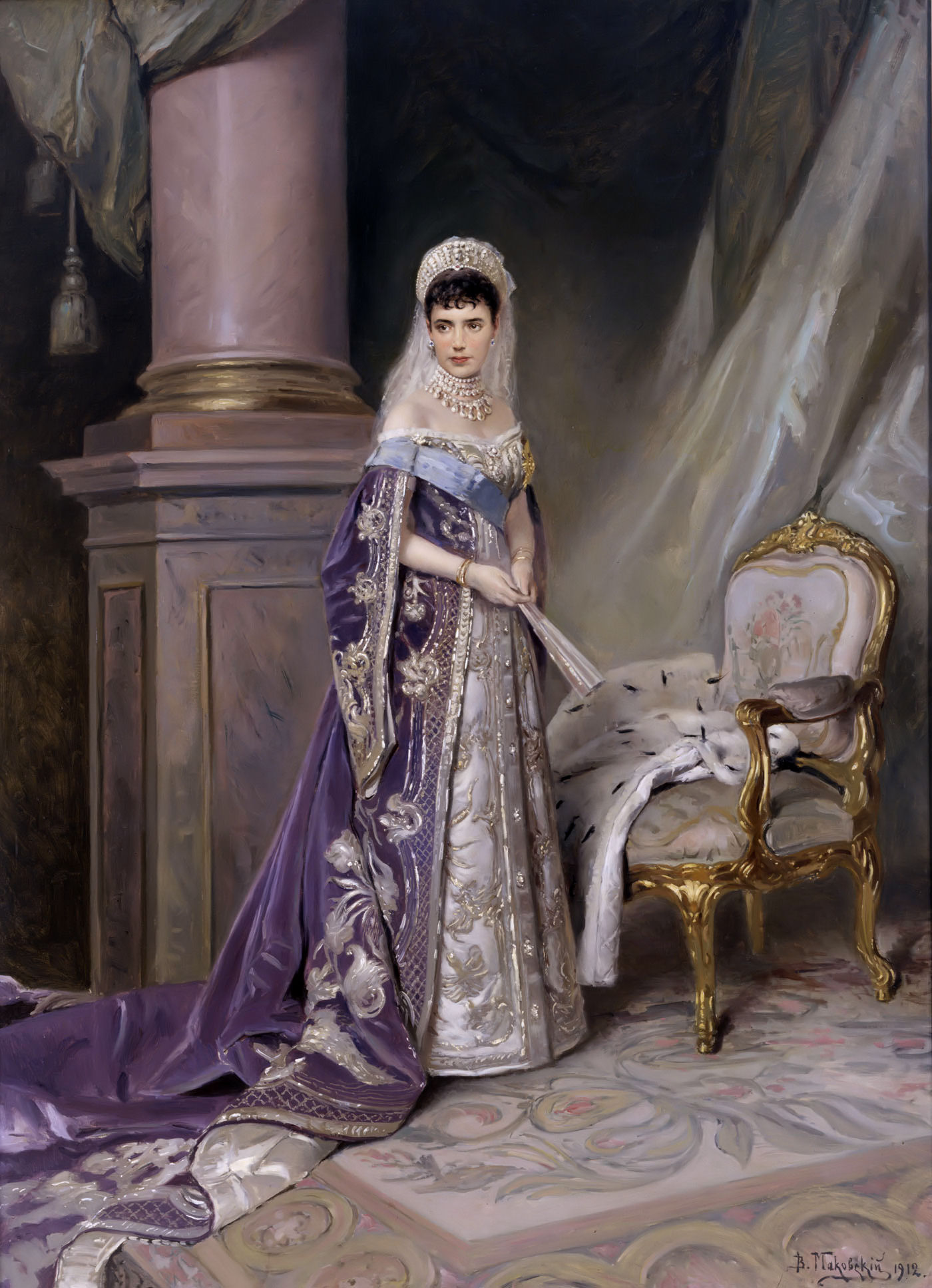
Portrait of Empress Maria Feodorovna, by Vladimir Makovski in 1912. The Empress is wearing a regular Court dress

All the ancient occupations of the women at the Court of Russia, traditionally held by boyarynias (wives of boyars), nurses, housekeepers, servants, nannies etc., were abolished and replaced by a new hierarchy inspired by Versailles Court's etiquette and German models, although many Muscovite and post-reform positions were in charge of identical functions. The new hierarchy used German terminology.

- Ober-Hofmeisterin (The Great Mistress of the Court); first class
- Wives of members of the Privy council of Russia; second class
- Deystvitelnaya Statsdame (literally Acting Lady of the State); third class
- Deystvitelnaya Kammer-devitsa (literally Acting Maid of the Bedchamber); fourth class and wives of College's presidents
- Hofdame (literally Lady of the Court); fifth class and Generals' wives
- Hofdevitsa (Maid of Honour); corresponding to Colonel's wives
- Kammer-devitsa (Maid of the Bedchamber)

The seven strict ranks were reduced to five by the mid 18th century and their names evolved as well. The four first ranks were only granted to 82 women at the end of the 18th century and only 18 in 1915.

- Ober-Hofmeisterin (The Great Mistress of the Court)
- Hofmeisterin (since 1748) (The Mistress of the Court)
- Statsdame, 12 in 1796 (Lady of the State)
- Kammer-Fräulein (Maid of the Bedchamber)
- Fräulein (pronounced in a Russian way: Freylina), 12 in 1796 (Maid of Honour)

== Service ==
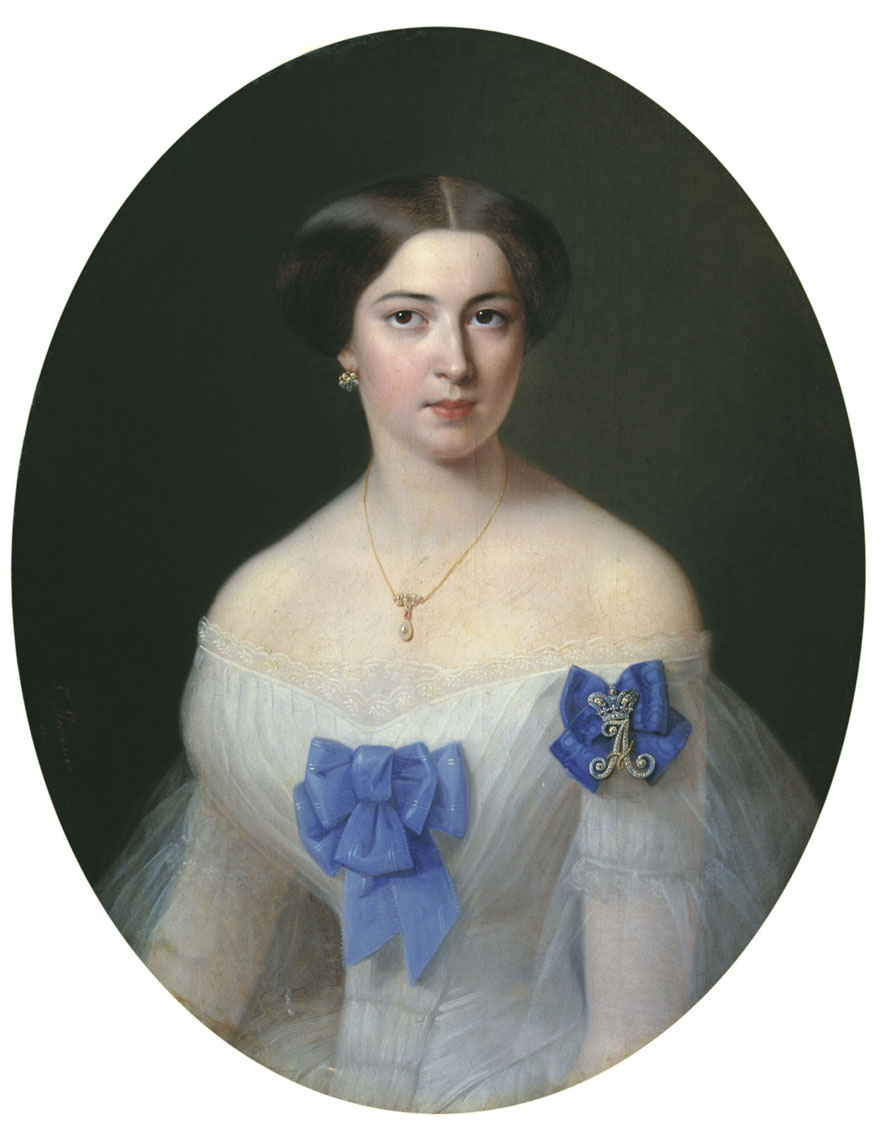
Portrait of Fräulein A.P. Alexandrova, with Empress Alexandra's initials, by Gavriil Iakovlev

- The Fräulein rank was the most common, around 189 for 203 ladies-in-waiting in 1881. In 1914, they were 261 for 280. A Fräulein or a Kammer-Fräulein were unmarried. A small number of those who married received a higher title but the vast majority had to leave the service at Court. In 1826, Nicolas I decided that only 36 Fräulein would be at the service of the Empress, Grand-Duchesses and Princesses of the Imperial family : they were called Fräulein of the Household. Being a Fräulein gave the right to wear white and red at Court.
- The Kammer-Fräulein rank was only granted to 4 or 5 ladies-in-waiting, the Statsdame rank was only granted to 5 ladies in 1914, all of them being married with high rank dignitaries. Most of these ladies, noblewomen of high rank, were members of the Order of St Catherine. Their positions rarely entailed daily service at Court, they were mostly honorific with attendance on great occasions.
- The "Hofmeisterin" or "Ober-Hofmeisterin" rank gave precedence over all the other ladies-in-waiting. They were members of the Empress` or Grand-Duchesses' Households and were in charge of introductions of the women invited to Court.
- The Hofmeisterin, Statsdame and Kammer-Fräulein ranks entitled their holder to the form of address Your High Excellency (Ваше Высокопревосходительство).

During the official ceremonies, the ladies-in-waiting had to wear specific Court dresses according to a regulation of 1834 fixing the clothing, the manner and the colors allowed for each one. A Hofmeisterin, Statsdame or Kammer-Fräulein wore a miniature portrait of the Empress on their right shoulder and were called dames à portrait, one of the most prestigious positions at Court. After they left active service, they would wear it on their left shoulder. The Fräulein would only wear the Empress or Grand Duchess' initials in diamonds, pinned to their left shoulder. In the 18th century, some of them were granted the right to wear curls.

Founded by Catherine II in 1764, the Smolny Institute near the Smolny convent, used to be a nursery for future ladies-in-waiting.

== Sources ==
- Придворные дамы Российской империи
