= Order of Saint Catherine =

Order of knighthood for women in Russia

Imperial Order of Saint Catherine Императорский Орден Святой Екатерины
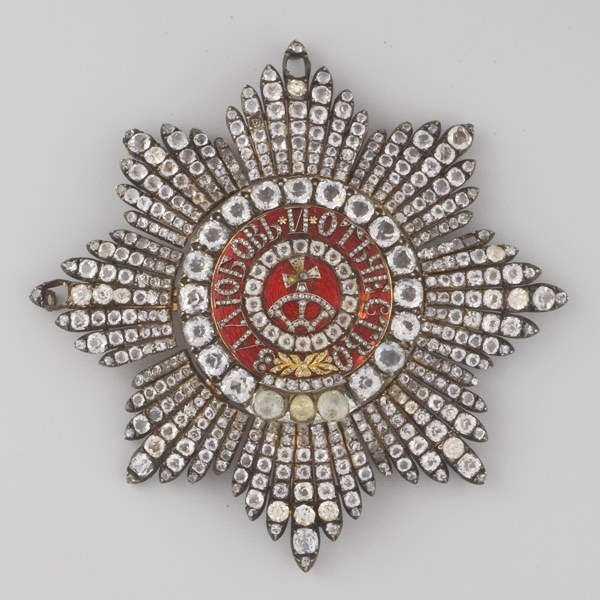
- Star of the order.

Awarded by Head of the House of Romanov (claimant)
- Type: Dynastic Order
- Royal house: House of Romanov
- Religious affiliation: Russian Orthodox
- Ribbon: Red with Silver thread on either side.
- Motto: "For Love and Fatherland"
- Eligibility: women
- Status: Rarely constituted
- Sovereign: Head of the House of Romanov
- Grand Mistress: Grand Duchess Maria Vladimirovna of Russia (disputed)
- Grades: Dame Grand Cross; Dame

Precedence
- Next (higher): Imperial Order of Saint Andrew
- Next (lower): Imperial Order of the White Eagle
- Equivalent: Imperial Order of Saint Alexander Nevsky
- Ribbon of the order

The Imperial Order of Saint Catherine (Russian: Императорский Орден Святой Екатерины) was an award of Imperial Russia. Instituted on 24 November 1714 by Peter the Great on the occasion of his marriage to Catherine I of Russia. For the majority of the time of Imperial Russia, it was the only award for women; the Insignia of Saint Olga existed briefly from 1916 to 1917, but ceased with the fall of the Romanov dynasty.

The statutes of the Order were first published in 1713, and the order was under the patronage of Saint Catherine of Alexandria, the patron saint of the Empress. On 24 November 1714, on the Empress' name day, Peter the Great personally bestowed the insignia of the Order upon the Empress Catherine, creating her Grand Mistress of the Order. However, no further members were inducted until 1726. Today, Grand Duchess Maria Vladimirovna is acknowledged as Grand Mistress of the Order by Burke's World Orders of Knightood and Merit, and by the International Commission on Orders of Chivalry. This right is disputed by some members of the Romanov Family Association.

== Classes ==
The award was bestowed in two classes:

- Dame Grand Cordon (entitled to both the Sash badge and the Star)
- Dame (entitled to the Badge)

== Insignia ==
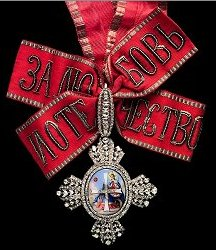
Greater Cross: Badge

- A Riband (sash) of scarlet moiré with silver edges embroidered with the inscription: За Любовь и Отечество (Za Lyubov' i Otechestvo, "For Love and the Fatherland").
- The Badge (or Jewel) of the Order consisted of a cross with a large medallion set in the center of it. On the medallion was depicted the order's patron saint, Catherine of Alexandria, holding a large white cross, the symbol of her martyrdom. In the four quadrants formed by the cross are written the initials, "D.S.F.R." (Domine Salvum Fac Regem, God Save the Tsar). The Badge was attached to the Riband. On the obverse is an image of eagles destroying a nest of snakes at the foot of a ruined tower, at the top of which is a nest of eaglets. Above is the motto Aequant Munia Comparis ("By her works she is to her husband compared").
- The Star (or Plaque) consisted of a medallion set on a silver, eight-pointed star with rays, encrusted with diamonds. On the red medallion in the center is depicted the wheel of Saint Catherine (symbol of her martyrdom) surmounted by a cross. Encircling the medallion is the motto of the order (the same as on the Riband).

== Membership ==
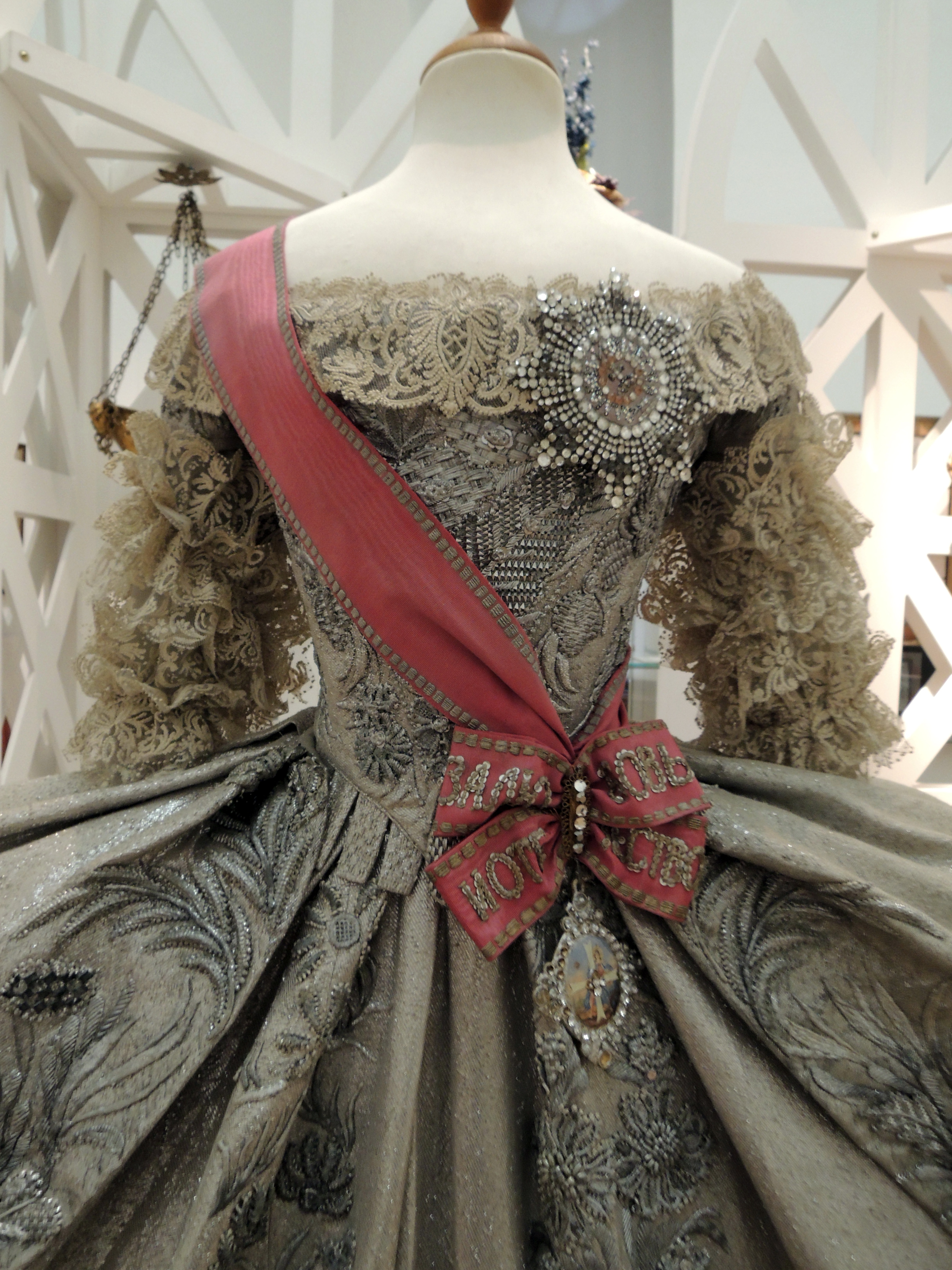
Replica of Catherine II's wedding dress (1745) featuring the scarlet sash of the Order of Saint Catherine

Every Russian Grand Duchess was conferred the Grand Cross of the Order at her christening (or marriage into the Romanov family), and Princesses of the Imperial Blood were invested upon attaining their majority at 18.

In addition to the royal members, a fixed number (106) of other members were permitted by the statutes:

- 12 Dames Grand Cross
- 94 Dames Small Cross

The 12 Dames Grand Cross were typically female members of foreign ruling houses. Queen Alexandra of Great Britain was made a Dame Grand Cross of the Order of Saint Catherine by Alexander II, and Princess Andrew of Greece was also a member of the Order.

The only known award of the order to a male was in 1727 to then 13-year-old prince Alexander Menshikov, son of Aleksandr Danilovich Menshikov, closest friend of Emperor Peter I of Russia.

The Dames Small Cross were all women of the highest nobility, who were part of the suite of the Empress and had engaged in important philanthropic or charitable works outside of their duties at Court.

== Annual function ==
The Order of Saint Catherine's annual function was held on 24 November [O.S. 7 December], the feast day of Saint Catherine of Alexandria. The Order met for a celebration of the Divine Liturgy. Then, wearing the robes and the insignia of the Order, the women of the Imperial Family, followed by the 106 Dames Grand and Small Cross would go in procession from the Imperial Chapel to a banqueting hall specially prepared for the occasion. The Hall of Saint Catherine in the Great Kremlin Palace in Moscow was used for these occasions. The coloring and decoration of the hall incorporate those of the Order. The hall also served as the throne room for the Empress Consort. To this day, in the Russian Federation uses this room to receive foreign dignitaries.

== See also ==
- Dynastic Orders of Knighthood
- Chivalric orders
- Moscow School of the Order of St Catherine
