= Culture of the Russian Armed Forces =

Overview of the culture of Russian Armed Forces

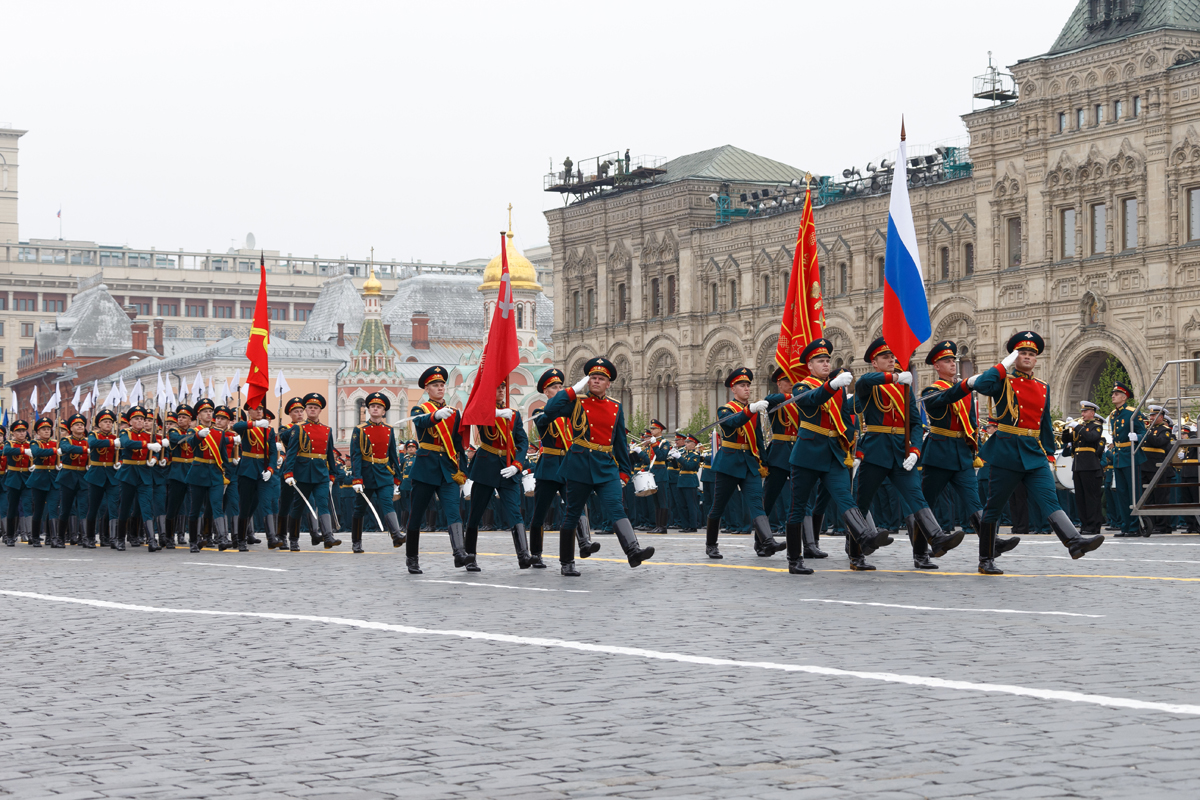
The Flag of Russia (center), the Banner of Victory (left), and the Banner of the Russian Armed Forces (right), all of which are symbols of the Russian military, during the 2019 Moscow Victory Day Parade on Red Square.

The Culture of the Russian Armed Forces is widely varied, but unique amongst the branches of the armed forces, and shared with the other uniformed organizations within Russia. Military culture is the most important component of military life. The major cultural events held by the Russian military are primarily aimed at strengthening esprit de corps as well as advancing the historical traditions of the Armed Forces of Russia. The Ministry of Defence of Russia regularly holds cultural events at various levels. The central cultural institutions of the Ministry of Defense of the Russian Federation are actively working in all military districts.

== Official traditions and customs ==
These traditions are upheld by the Ground Forces, Aerospace Forces, the Navy, the Strategic Missile Forces and the Airborne Forces.

=== Holidays ===
- Joint service
  - February 23 - Defender of the Fatherland Day
  - February 15 - International Duties Memorial Day is a veterans day that honors those who served in the Soviet–Afghan War and during combined-arms actions of the Warsaw Pact during the Cold War (e.g. Sino-Soviet border conflict, Soviet invasion of Czechoslovakia, and Ogaden War).
- Service branches
  - October 1 - Russian Ground Forces Day marks the raising of the first units of the Streltsy by Ivan the Terrible in 1550.
  - August 12 - Russian Air Force Day
  - Last Sunday of July - Navy Day
  - December 17 - Strategic Missile Troops Day was introduced in 1995 to commemorate the establishment of the strategic missile forces on 17 December 1959.
  - August 2 - Paratroopers' Day
  - October 24 - Day of Special Forces honors the 1950 raising of the first Spetsnaz companies
- Specialized forces
  - February 27 - Special Operations Forces Day commemorates establishment of annexation of Crimea in 2014
  - August 6 - Russian Railway Troops Day
  - October 4 - Russian Aerospace Defense Forces Day marks the anniversary of the 1957 launch of the Sputnik satellite.
  - November 19 - Day of the Missile Forces and Artillery commemorate the artillery strikes employed at Battle of Stalingrad in 1942.
  - November 27 - Naval Infantry Day honors the 1705 date of the raising of the first units of today's Russian Marines by Peter the Great.
  - Second Sunday of September - Day of Tankmen
  - 19 September - Gunsmith Day honors personnel of the Military-Industrial Commission and the defense industry of Russia.

=== Events ===
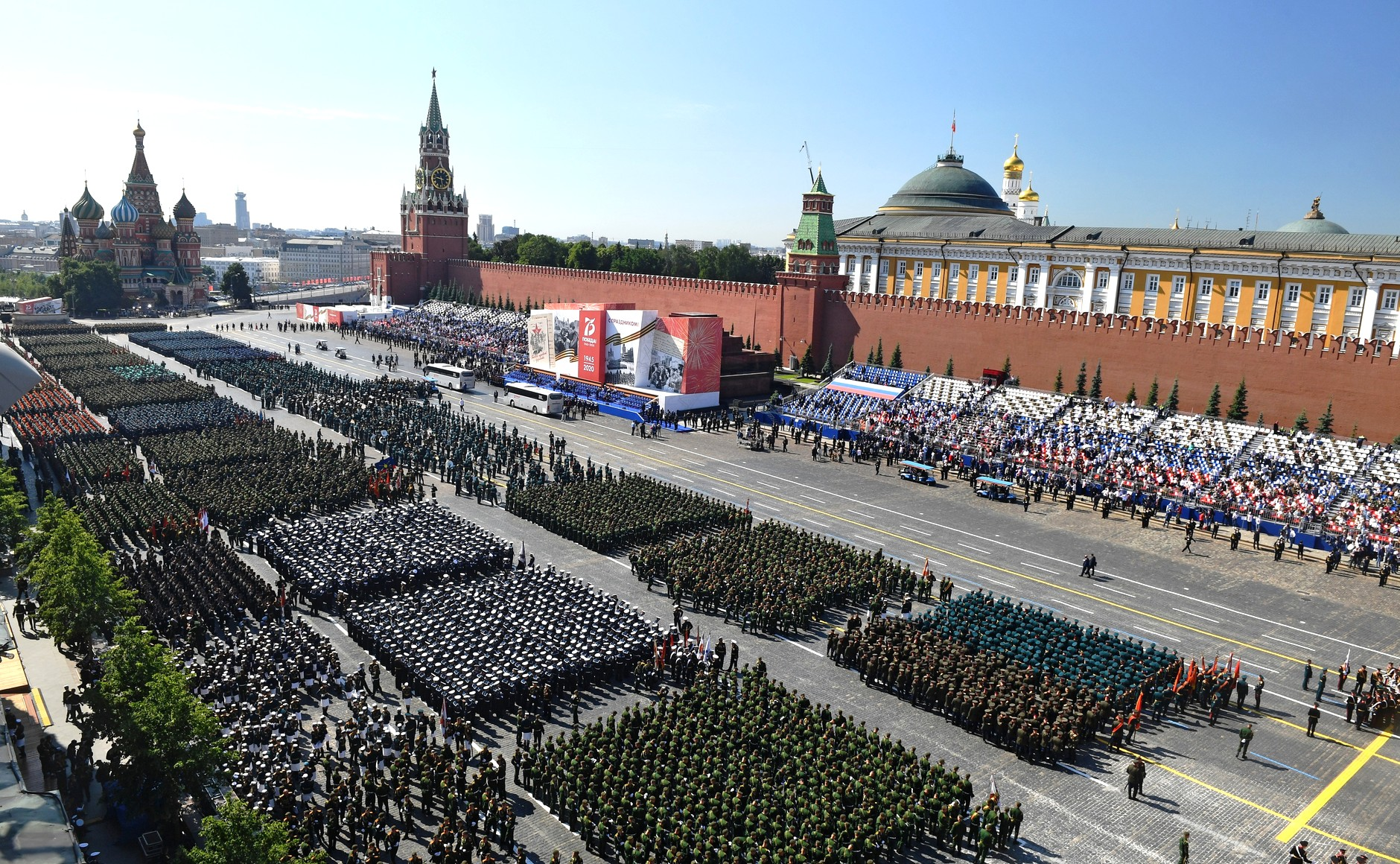
Russian forces prior to the 2020 victory parade on 24 June.

Victory Day Parades are held throughout the country, being unique to Russia and a common traditional military event on Victory Day. The Moscow Victory Day Parade is the main parade of these to be held in Russia, being held on the Russian capital's main square, Red Square. The first of these parades was held in 1995, just five years after the fall of the Soviet Union, held to commemorate the golden jubilee of the Soviet and allied victory in the Second World War.

=== Drill ===
==== Commands ====
- Present arms - The command Na k'rah-ool! (На Караул!), also known as On Guard or Present Arms, is a command used for, with the preparatory command usually being Eyes on the Right and/or Eyes on the Left or Eyes on the Front. With an SKS rifle, present arms is carried out in two steps: through holding the rifle with the right hand, then, raising the rifle to the center of the chest, holding the rifle neck with the left, and then finally, the right hand moving to barrel of the rifle. When carrying an assault rifle, personnel will put the left hand flat over the neck of the weapon.
- At attention - The command of attention is known as Smer-nah (Смирно), during which soldiers of any unit snap their heads to the front and hold their chin up.

==== March step ====
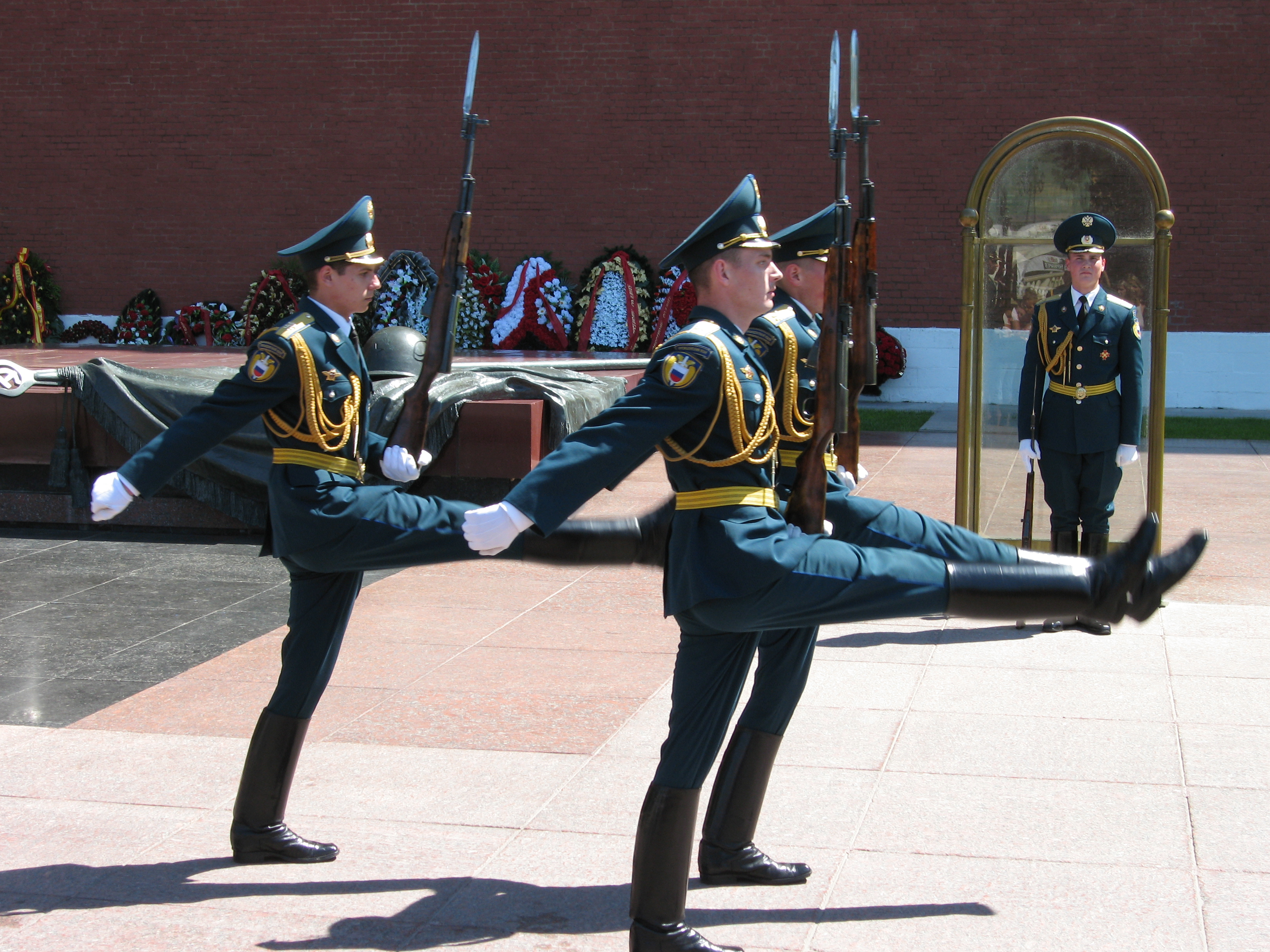
Representative of the Kremlin Regiment goose-stepping near the Tomb of the Unknown Soldier.

The goose step is the standard marching step utilized by the Russian military. Originating in Prussian Army in the mid-18th century, it spread to Russia in the 19th century and was fully utilized by the Imperial Russian Army in the early 20th century. During the Cold War, the Soviet Union trained the militaries of its client states (particularly those in the Warsaw Pact) with Soviet ceremonial military drill, leading to its adoption in many Third World countries. A notable example of this in action was the East German Nationale Volksarmee, in which the Soviets encouraged a Prussian-style goose step.

=== Heraldry ===
Each branch of the Armed Forces has a representative colour, with a ceremonial colour also corresponding to the entire military. This colour was first introduced on 8 December 2000. Being implemented later that month, it was simply a plain red field, symbolizing the traditional red color of the Soviet Armed Forces and its predecessor the Red Army. The present official colour was adopted by order of the State Duma in June 2003, consisting of the coat of arms of Russia on the obverse side and the emblem of the armed forces, a double-headed eagle holding a sword and a laurel wreath, on the reverse side. While having elements of the military flags dating back to the latter years of the Russian Empire, it also contains four golden stars in each corner to honor its Soviet heritage. The reverse side also contains two pieces of text stylised as Old Slavonic script, with the top side containing the inscription "Fatherland" ("Отечество") and the bottom side containing "Duty" ("Долг") and "Honor" ("Честь").

=== Mottos and battle cries ===
List of unit mottos:

- С нами Бог и Андреевский флаг! ("God and St. Andrew's flag are with us!") - Russian Navy
- Там, где мы, там — победа! ("Where We Are, There is Victory!") - Russian Naval Infantry
- Никто, кроме нас! ("Nobody, but us!") - Russian Airborne
- После нас - тишина ("After us - silence") - Strategic Missile Forces
- Положение обязывает ("Noble Obligation") - 154th Preobrazhensky Independent Commandant's Regiment
- Честь и слава ("Honour and glory") - 4th Guards Tank Division
- Мы всюду там, где ждут победу! ("We are there, when victory is awaited!") - 76th Guards Air Assault Division
- Честь и Родина превыше всего! ("Honor and Motherland above all!") - 98th Guards Airborne Division
- Родина, честь, слава ("Motherland, Honour, Glory") - 2nd Guards Motor Rifle Division
- Мужество, отвага, честь! ("Courage, valor, honor!") - 7th Guards Mountain Air Assault Division
- Нет задач невыполнимых! ("There are no impossible tasks!") - 106th Guards Airborne Division
- Побеждает сильнейший ("The strongest wins") - 45th Guards Spetznaz Brigade
- Что хорошо для других, то недостаточно для Семёновцев! ("What is good for others is not enough for Semyonovites!") - 1st Semyonovsky Independent Rifle Regiment

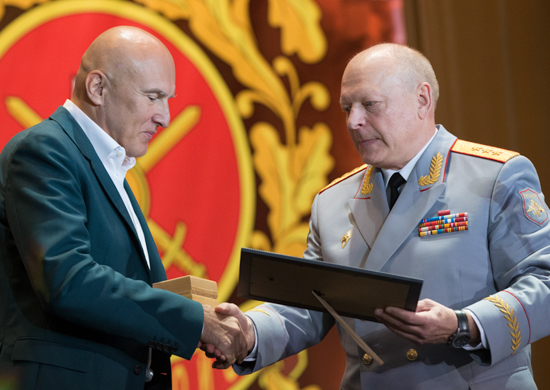
Igor Matvienko with the Commander-in-Chief of the Ground Forces Oleg Salyukov during the presentation of the anthem of the Ground Forces on 1 October 2016.

=== Service marches and other military songs ===
The following are service marches used by the armed forces:

- Forward, infantry! (by Igor Matvienko) – Russian Ground Forces
- Air March (by Yuli Kant) – Russian Aerospace Forces
- The Crew—One Family – Russian Navy
- March of the Artillerymen (by Tikhon Khrennikov) – Strategic Missile Forces
- Our 10th Parachute Battalion (by Bulat Okudzhava) – Russian Airborne Forces

"Farewell of Slavianka" and "Den Pobedy" are among the many internationally famous military marches from Russia. Many famous melodies as "Katyusha", "The Sacred War", "Siny Platochek", and "Moscow Nights" have been converted into marches by certain military composers. These marches are used often at the Moscow Victory Day Parade among other events. Some of these pieces are used elsewhere in the militaries of the Commonwealth of Independent States.

== Institutional culture ==
=== History ===
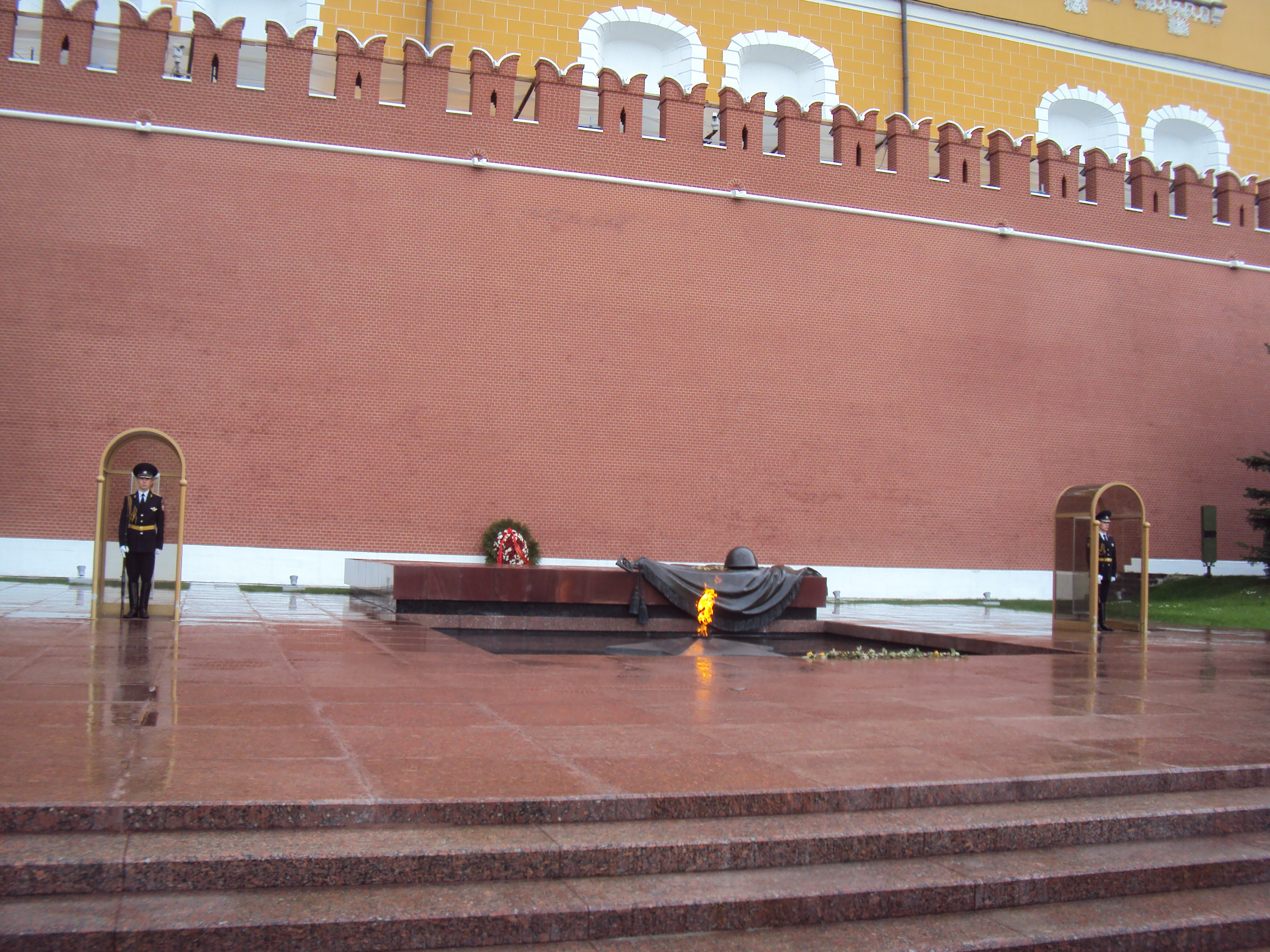
General view of the Tomb of the Unknown Soldier.

Several army museums have been established, most notably the Moscow-based Central Armed Forces Museum. Memorials serve as a way to preserve the military history of Russia, with one of the most iconic memorials is the Tomb of the Unknown Soldier, notably featuring the eternal flame. Other memorials to Russian military forces include the Rzhev Memorial to the Soviet Soldier and the Mamayev Kurgan.

==== Current museums ====
- Central Armed Forces Museum
- Central Air Force Museum
- Kubinka Tank Museum
- Peter the Great Central Naval Museum
- Museum of the Air Force of the Northern Fleet
- Military Historical Museum of Artillery, Engineering Troops and Signal Corps
- Air Defence Forces Museum
- Museum of the History of the Airborne Forces
- Naval Museum of the Northern Fleet
- Military Medical Museum
- Military History Museum of the Pacific Fleet
- Museum of the History of Military Uniforms
- Military History Museum of the Black Sea Fleet
- Baltic Fleet Museum

==== Notable war memorials (domestic and abroad) ====
- Alyosha Monument
- Khimki War Memorial
- Bronze Soldier of Tallinn (made by the Soviet government in 1947 in the capital of what is now Estonia)
- Monument to the Liberators of Soviet Latvia and Riga (made by the Soviet government in 1985 in the capital of what is now Latvia)
- Eternity Memorial Complex (built in 1975 and opened in the capital of Moldova)
- Soviet War Memorial, Treptower Park, Berlin
- Monument to the Soviet Army in Sofia, Bulgaria
- Soviet War Memorial in Vienna (located on the Austrian capital's Schwarzenbergplatz)

=== House of Military Officers ===
A House of Officers (Russian: Дом офицеров) is the Russian/Soviet equivalent to military officers' clubs that originated in the United States. It effectively serves as cultural center for the improvement of civil–military relations. In the early days of the USSR, these institutions were known as Houses of the Red Army. Events in the building include cultural activities that meet spiritual and cultural need for military/civilian personnel of the Armed Forces. Similar tasks are present in the Officers Houses of the armed forces of post-Soviet republics. During the Soviet era, party conferences were held for members of the Communist Party of the Soviet Union. The main Russian officer house is the Central House of Officers of the Russian Army, located on Suvorov Square in Moscow.

=== Central Naval Library ===
The Federal State Treasury Institution of Culture and Art "Central Naval Library" of the Ministry of Defense is the oldest and largest library in the Armed Forces, serving as an information, bibliographic and methodological center for all libraries of the Russian Navy. The history of the Central Naval Library dates back to 25 November 1799, when the "Committee for Discussion of Issues on Shipbuilding and Navigation" was established under the Admiralty Board, subordinate to the President of the Admiralty Collegium, Tsar Paul I of Russia. The committee began to form a collection on maritime history, which laid the foundation for the first Maritime Library of St. Petersburg. The library has a color Atlas of Admiral Adam Johann von Krusenstern round-the-world travel, published by the Russian Academy of Sciences in 1813. In 2018, the library received as a gift documents from the personal archive of Minister of Defense, General Sergey Shoygu. In 2017, the book collections of the branch of the Central Naval Library returned to the Admiralty. In April 2018, the move of the Central Naval Library from the Mikhailovsky Castle to the reconstructed building on Vasilievsky Island was completed.

=== The Arts ===
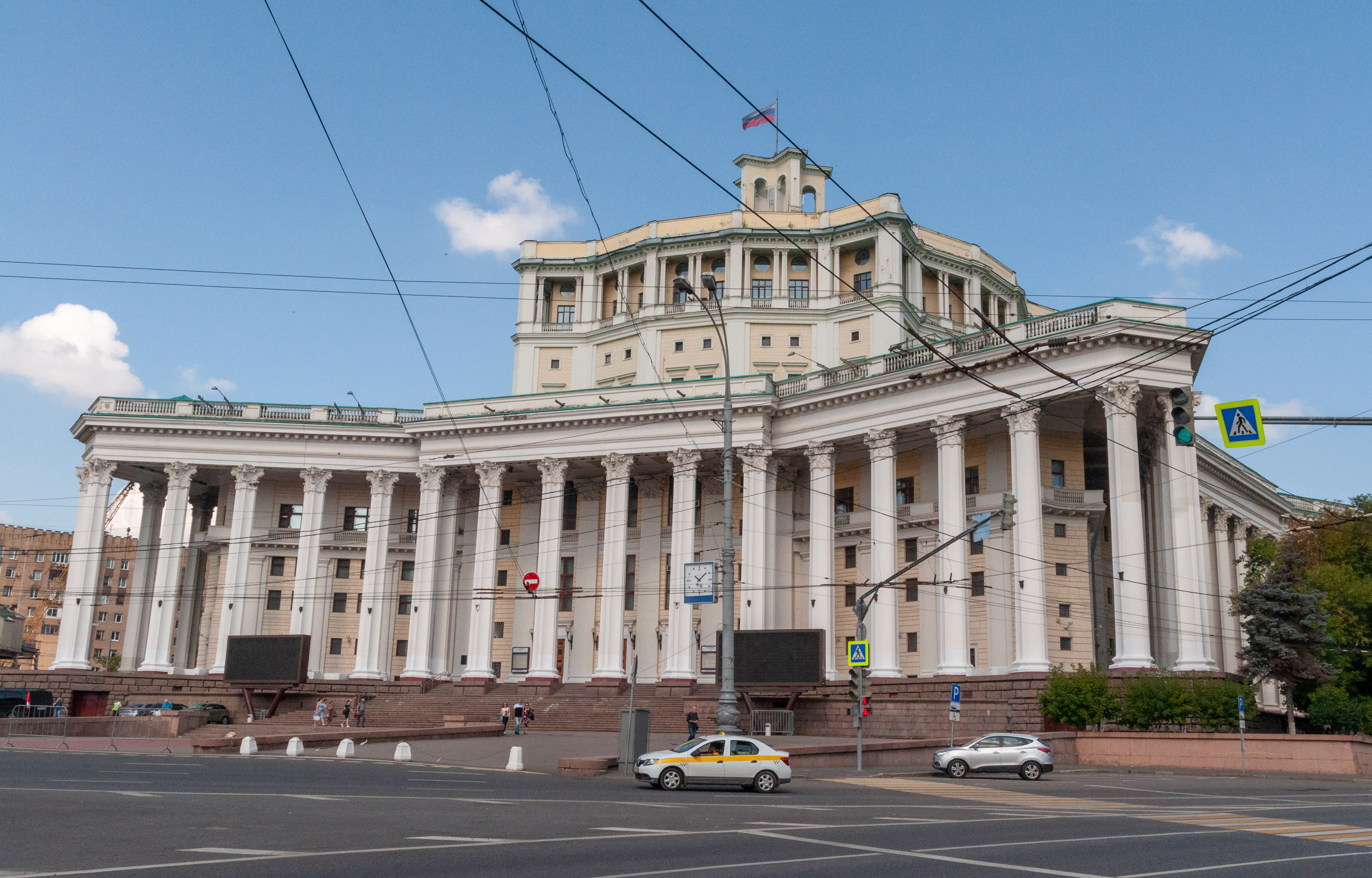
The building of Russian Army Theatre.

==== Theaters ====
The Armed Forces' theatrical production houses and entities include:

- Central Academic Theater of the Russian Army
- Drama Theater of the Eastern Military District
- Drama Theater of the Northern Fleet
- Drama Theater of the Baltic Fleet
- Drama Theater of the Pacific Fleet
- Drama Theater of the Black Sea Fleet

==== Military Artists' Studio ====
The Mitrofan Grekov Military Artists' Studio is a creative team that was founded in 1934 in memory of Soviet artist Mitrofan Grekov, the founder of Soviet battle painting. The team employs more than ten folk artists. The main task of the studio is to recreate moments of Russian military glory through painting. More than 70 panoramas and dioramas, ranging from the first Soviet panorama "Battle of Stalingrad", to a recreation of Franz Roubaud's panorama "Battle of Borodino", have seen the involvement of the studio. It is a recipient of the Order of the Red Banner of Labor and the Order of the Red Star.

==== Film Studio ====
The Film Studio of the Ministry of Defense (Киностудия Минобороны РФ) creates educational films for the Russian Armed Forces and is responsible for the distribution of military educational, documentary and technical propaganda for the MoD and the Russian government. The film studio was formed in 1960 in Leningrad in order to unite the scattered film studios, initially, being subordinate to the Main Directorate of Combat Training of the Ground Forces, and has been subordinate to the branch since 1998. In 1963, the film studio was transferred to Moscow on the territory of the former air defense town (Vykhino). In the same year, a film group was created at the General Staff to plan the production of films for the Armed Forces. Seven years later, it was transformed into the Department of Military Training Films of the Soviet Ministry of Defence. In 1985, the film studio was awarded the Order of the Red Star for its services in generalizing the experience of World War II. At its peak in the mid-1980s, the studio had 19 officers and 516 employees from the Soviet Army. After the dissolution of the Soviet Union, the film studio was greatly reduced and relocated to Bolshevo near Moscow, on the territory of its former branch. The level of funding has decreased, and, consequently, the number of films released was minimal.

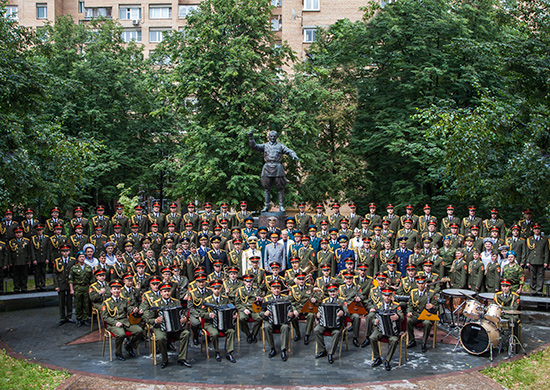
The Alexandrov Ensemble

==== Song and Dance Ensembles ====
The Armed Forces hosts the following song and dance ensembles:

- Alexandrov Ensemble - official ensemble of the Armed Forces and its most senior ensemble
- Song and Dance Ensemble of the Western Military District
- Song and Dance Ensemble of the Central Military District
- Song and Dance Ensemble of the Southern Military District
- Song and Dance Ensemble of the Eastern Military District
- Song and Dance Ensemble of the Russian Aerospace Forces
- Song and Dance Ensemble of the Strategic Missile Forces "Krasnaya Zvezda"
- Song and Dance Ensemble of the Airborne Forces
- Song and Dance Ensemble of the Northern Fleet
- Song and Dance Ensemble of the Baltic Fleet
- Song and Dance Ensemble of the Pacific Fleet
- Song and Dance Ensemble of the Black Sea Fleet
- Engineering Troops Ensemble "For Faith and Fatherland"

==== Military bands ====
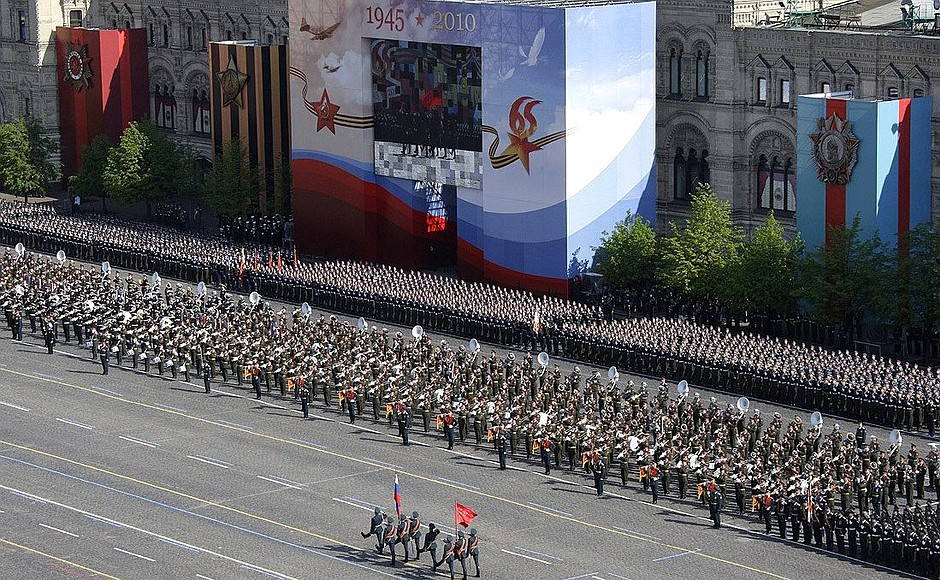
The massed bands of the Moscow Garrison in 2010.

Russian military bands fall under the jurisdiction of the Military Band Service of the Armed Forces of Russia, which is the official music service for the Armed Forces. It is led by the Senior Director of Music, who is a general officer. There are currently between 200 and 300 military bands in across the military and in the uniformed services in the country. As of 2009, all military musicians are paid around 13,000 rubles ($203.11) for their service.

=== Sports ===
==== Sports Clubs ====
- Central Army Sports Club (Moscow)
- CSKA Branch (St. Petersburg)
- CSKA Branch (Rostov-on-Don)
- CSKA Branch (Khabarovsk)
- CSKA Branch (Smolensk)
- CSKA Branch (Samara)
- Sports Center for Sea and Physical Training in Sevastopol
- CSKA Branch (Gelendzhik)

==== Competitive competitions ====
In 2018, more than 2,500 mass competitions were held with the involvement of all personnel in 37 disciplines of military applied sports, more than 3,000 instructor-methodological and demonstration classes in various sections of physical training, more than 600 seminars with non-staff physical training organizers and unit commanders. All-army competitions for the Cup of the Ministry of Defense of the Russian Federation "Commander starts" were held, where more than 3,000 officers and generals took part in the competition. Military athletes from among the candidates for the national teams of the Russian Federation in Olympic sports serve in sports companies.

The International Army Games is an annual Russian military sports event organized by the Russian military, with the first edition having been staged in August 2015, with the participation of close to 30 countries. In addition to the main competition, the games includes a military theme park, a recruitment station, and souvenir shops.

== In popular culture ==
=== War films ===
During World War Two, many films from the Central Newsreel Studio were produced as propaganda for the allied powers. Notable films among these include Fall of Berlin – 1945, Moscow Strikes Back, Encounter at the Elbe, and Ukraine in Flames.

== See also ==
- Culture of Russia
- Culture of the United States Marine Corps
- Central Archives of the Russian Ministry of Defence
- Flag Raising Ceremony (China)
