= Yekaterininskiy Park =

Historic park in Moscow, Russia

- Екатерининский парк
- View of the big pond and Olympic Stadium
- Location in Moscow
- Location: Moscow, Russia
- Coordinates: 55°46′59″N 37°37′13″E
- Area: 16 hectares (40 acres)
- Open: 1807
- Public transit: Dostoevskaya

Yekaterininskiy Park (Russian: Екатери́нинский парк, romanized: Ekaterininsky Park, lit. 'Catherine's Park') is a park in Moscow, Russia. It is located in Meshchansky District of Central Administrative Okrug and borders Tverskoy District. The park was founded in 1807 and named after the institute it belonged to, that bore the name of Catherine II.

== History ==
=== Early years ===
Prior to any development, the area of the park represented a swampy landscape with ponds, through which flowed a tributary of Neglinnaya river. By the XV century, the area around it became a farmland, and the river was called "Naprudnaya" (meaning on pond) after Naprudskoe settlement upstream. Small dams and a rampart were constructed around the ponds by XVI century, and later a church along with residential areas. In XVIII century, the area was incorported into the city of Moscow as a part of "Naprudnaya sloboda". From 1770's, a portion of the park served as gardens for Saltykov family, after one of the members commissioned the architect Dmitry Ukhtomsky to build his personal manor there, which was purchased by the authorities in 1777 and transformed into a poorhouse for veterans, that became an Institute for Noble Maidens in 1802.

In 1807, the park was oficially established as a part of the Moscow School of the Order of St Catherine and named accordingly. Following the Fires of 1812 that destroyed the majority of wooden buildings in the area, park was expanded to the other bank of the river.

=== 20th century ===
As the Russian Revolution was approaching, park held a workers strike in Autumn of 1903. By 1914, Naprudnaya river running through the park was moved to the underground tunnel. During Soviet period, the park was renamed as former Institute was repurposed in 1928 to Central House of the Soviet Army (Russian: Центрального дома Советской армии (ЦДСА)).

In 1930's, park was subjected to renovations as a part of General Plan for the Reconstruction of Moscow, where it should've been incorporated into continuous green space stretching from Garden Ring to VDNKH. The project has been completed only partially: Suvorov square was expanded and Church of St. John the Warrior nearby was demolished for Stalinist architecture hotel building. Inside of the park, new infrastructure, cafés and an open tennis stadium was built, where French tennis player Henri Cochet played a game in 1936. The venue was later demolished.

In 1950's, a bandstand was built in the northern part of the park, and a small planetarium in 1958 at south-east. In 1965, Central Armed Forces Museum claimed a portion of land to the west for the outdoor exhibition of military vehicles, that can be visible from the park.

=== 21st century ===
In 1999 park regained its historic name and underwent a renovation, which restored some historic objects and organized spaces for private vendors with other venues. The northern part of the park became designated to the Moscow House of Veterans of Wars and the Armed Forces, that was opened in 2000 and served as a place of rehabilitation for Great Patriotic War participators. Minor changes followed up until the park was closed for another global renovation in 2025, which is scheduled to be completed in 2026.The project envisions modernized versions of existing structures, and a bridge connection to the Olimpiysky Sports Complex.

In October 2026, mayor of Moscow Sergey Sobyanin announced that veteran rehabilitation complex will be upgraded to fit participators of Special Military Operation, and that it should become operational in 2027.

== Gallery ==
Main Enterance

Planetarium

Catherine's rotunda

Chapel of Alexander Nevsky and St. John the Warrior

300 year old willow

Aerial view of the park

== See also ==
- List of tourist attractions in Moscow
