= Decommunization in Russia =

Limited process of the removal of communist symbols

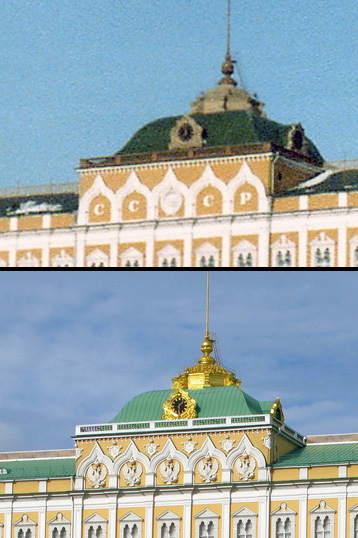
The façade of the Grand Kremlin Palace was restored to its original form after the dissolution of the USSR in 1991. The State Emblem of the USSR and the embedded letters forming the abbreviation of the USSR (CCCP) were both removed and replaced by five Russian double-headed eagles. An additional restoration of the coat of arms of the various territories of the Russian Empire were placed above the eagles.

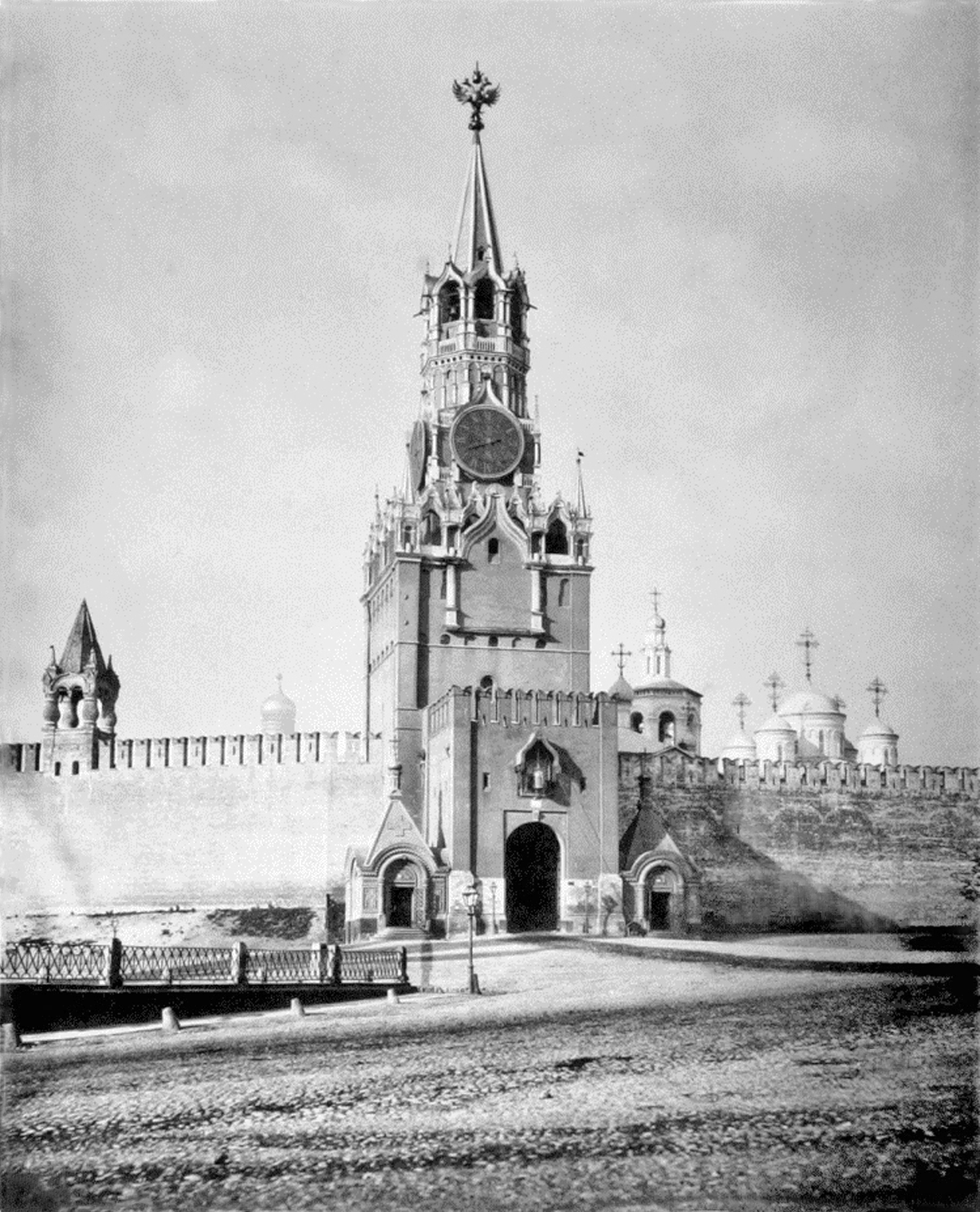
Conversely, the Spasskaya Tower had kept its red star finial and did not restore the double-headed eagle. Calls to remove or retain the red star have been controversial.

Decommunization in Russia is the process of dealing with the communist legacies of the Soviet Union in terms of institutions and personnel that tends towards breaking with the Soviet past. Russia's Decommunization has been restricted to half-measures, if conducted at all, compared with the efforts of the other Post-Soviet states and the former Eastern Bloc.

Notable anti-communist measures in Russia include the banning of the Communist Party of the Soviet Union, the restoration of the names of some cities back to their pre-Soviet names, and the construction of memorials to Soviet persecution. A number of public figures and organizations (for example, the political party PARNAS) have advocated for measures of decommunization and holding the organizers and enforcers of totalitarian policies accountable. According to public figure Andrey Zubov, decommunization should be carried out by analogy with denazification, with destalinization being a specific element of this process. According to polls, there is a general consensus among the Russian people that further or complete decommunization should be carried out only after the Soviet-era generations have died, with actions such as the removal of the Lenin Mausoleum and the burial of Vladimir Lenin's body.

Decommunization in Russia has seen the limited removal of communist names for settlements, streets and districts, as well as monuments to communist events and figures. Many prominent Russian politicians began their careers in the Soviet period, and there has been little scrutiny of their actions during this time. Russia's modern communist movement led by the Communist Party of the Russian Federation is much stronger than those in other post-communist states.

== August 1991 attempted coup ==
On 23 August 1991, two days after the failure of the August Coup, Russian president Boris Yeltsin suspended the existence of the Communist Party of the Russian SFSR, pending investigation of its role in the recent events. This decision was taken over the objections of Soviet president Mikhail Gorbachev, who insisted that the party as a whole was not to blame. The Communist Party Regional committees (obkom) in the Russian SFSR were closed, and the building of the Central Committee of the CPSU on the Old Square in Moscow was sealed.

The following day, on 24 August 1991, Gorbachev dissolved the Central Committee of the Communist Party of the Soviet Union (CPSU) and resigned as its secretary general while remaining President of the Soviet Union. On 25 August, Yeltsin issued another decree nationalizing the property of the Communist Party, including its archives and bank accounts, and transferring their control to the RSFSR Council of Ministers.

Within a few weeks after the coup, the Soviet Union peacefully broke up. On 6 November 1991, Yeltsin banned the Communist Party of the Soviet Union (CPSU), which had exercised pervasive control over Russian society for years. The breakup of the Soviet Union was acknowledged in the Belavezha Accords of 8 December, ratified by the Supreme Soviet of the Russian SFSR on 12 December. On 26 December 1991, the dissolution of the Soviet Union was declared. Its largest constituent republic, the Russian SFSR, was renamed the Russian Federation. It was formally established on 1 January 1992 and became the legal successor state of the Soviet Union.

=== Coup investigation, 1991–1992 ===
The Parliamentary Commission for Investigating Causes and Reasons of the coup attempt was established in 1991 under Lev Ponomaryov (including also Gleb Yakunin), but in 1992 it was dissolved at Ruslan Khasbulatov's insistence. Having gained access to secret KGB archives as a member of the committee, in March 1992, Gleb Yakunin published materials about co-operation of the Moscow Patriarchate with KGB. He claimed that Patriarch Alexius II, Mitropolit Filaret of Kiev, Pitrim of Volokolamsk, and others were recruited by the KGB.

A large part of the archives of the Communist Party (preserved now in state archives such as Archive of the President of the Russian Federation, Russian State Archive of Contemporary History, Russian State Archive of Socio-Political History and State Archive of the Russian Federation), including almost all documents of its Central Committee, remains classified. For a 1993 view on the problem, see Khubova, Dar'ia & Vitaly Chernetsky (1993). For an example of documents surreptitiously copied in those archives by Vladimir Bukovsky in 1992, see the Bukovsky Archives: Communism on Trial, 1937–1994 compiled and put online by the late Julia Zaks in 1999.

In 1992, several People's Deputies sued Yeltsin, demanding that his 1991 decrees concerning the Communist Party be declared acts that violated the principles of the contemporary Constitution. On 30 November 1992, the Constitutional Court of the Russian Federation partially reviewed the decrees and lifted the ban against the Communist Party of the Russian SFSR.

== Communism in Post-Soviet Russia ==
Russia, unlike the other Post-Soviet states, has maintained a sizeable and mainstream communist movement since the dissolution of the Soviet Union. The Communist Party of the Russian Federation (CPRF) was established in February 1993 as a spiritual successor to the banned CPSU, though a number of smaller communist parties claimed to be successors of the CPSU as well. The CPRF continues many of the traditions of the CPSU, including the use of Soviet symbols and the names of its youth wing and party newspaper, though its platform is more liberal. Currently, as of 2025, the CPRF is the second-largest party in the country after United Russia.

Lustration of senior CPSU and KGB officials was staunchly resisted in Russia and has never been implemented there, unlike in many Post-Soviet states. Many with such a background have remained in power after 1991; most present-day Russian politicians began their careers in the Soviet period. In December 1992, Galina Starovoytova introduced a draft law on lustration before the Russian parliament, then the RSFSR Supreme Soviet, but this was unsuccessful. Neither at that time nor later have such proposals been successfully introduced. Those arrested for their part in the August Coup were released from prison in 1992, and the charges against them were lifted on 23 February 1994 under an amnesty issued by the State Duma, which also covered those involved in the October 1993 events.

Vasily Starodubtsev, a member of the CPRF and Agrarian Party of Russia, served as Governor of Tula Oblast from 1997 to 2005. Anatoly Lukyanov, a co-founder of the CPRF, was elected to the State Duma from 1993 to 2003. Lukyanov was Gorbachev's former deputy but turned into a CPSU hardliner during the latter years of the Soviet Union. Valentin Varennikov, an unrepentant Stalinist, was elected to the State Duma first for the CPRF from 1995 to 2003 and then for Rodina until his death in 2009. Both Lukyanov and Varennikov headed parliamentary committees.

== Understanding of the Soviet past ==
Conscious attempts in Russian society to deal with negative aspects of the Soviet past and their consequences have been uncertain. Organisations such as Memorial have worked on numerous projects involving witnesses to past events such as Gulag inmates and Soviet rights activists, as well as educating younger generations of Russians on these events, including schoolchildren. Memorial was officially banned in Russia in 2022 due to alleged violations of foreign agent laws, which led to a decline in reckoning with the Soviet past.

Explanations for this phenomenon can be attributed to a number of different causes: nostalgia, the political and economic turmoil in Russia after the Soviet collapse, dissatisfaction with post-communist life, and the greater intertwining of Soviet and Russian identities compared to other nationalities.

A number of memorials to victims of Soviet persecution have appeared in Russia, including the Mask of Sorrow in Magadan, the Solovetsky Stone in Moscow, the Mourning Angel in Tolyatti, and the Sandarmokh near Medvezhyegorsk. On 30 October 2017, Putin unveiled the massive but controversial Wall of Grief monument in Moscow, attempting to draw a line under the past.

== Symbols and renamings ==
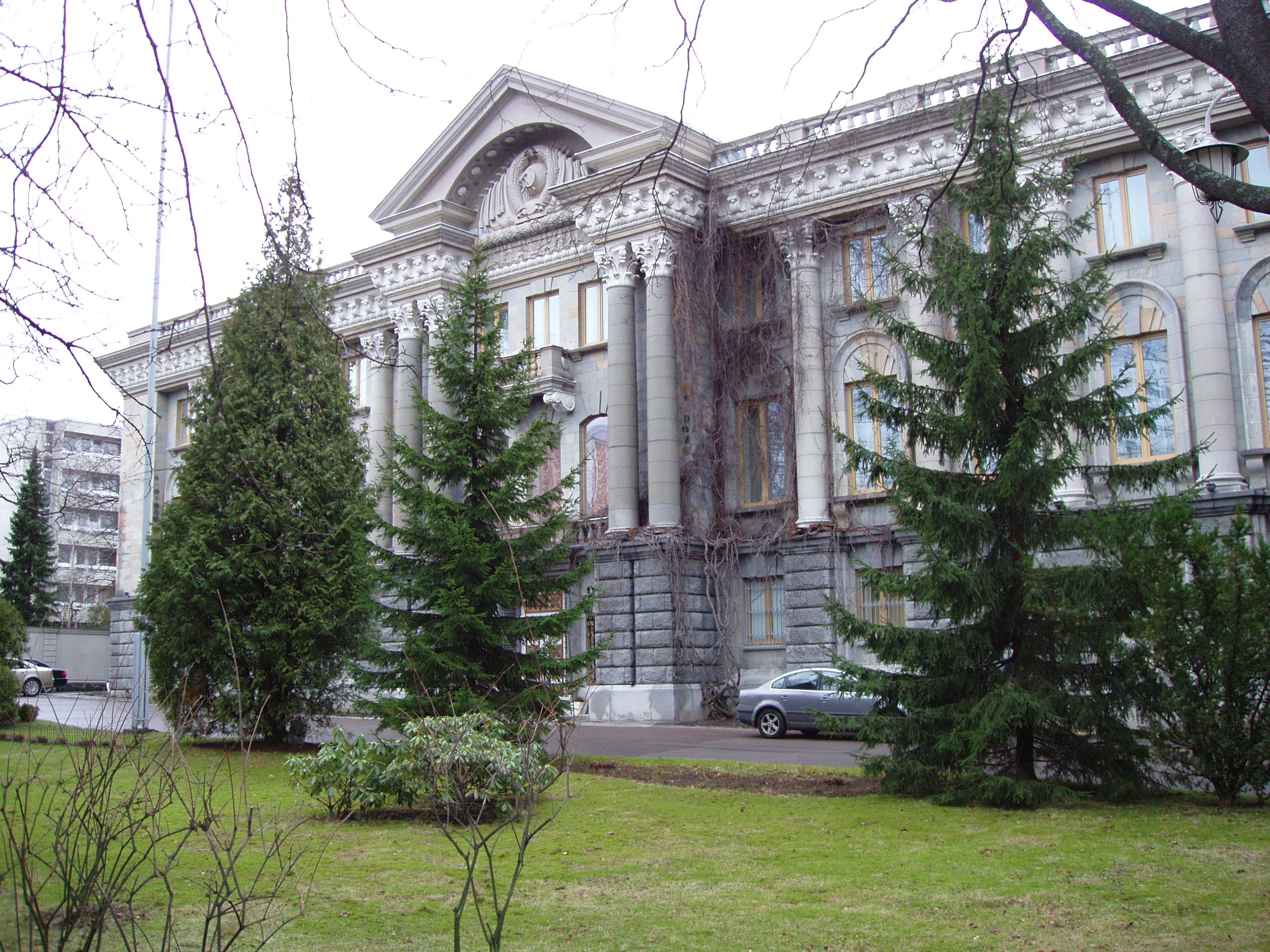
The Russian embassy in Helsinki, Finland, still bears a bas-relief of the Soviet emblem.

Russia has seen the removal of Soviet symbols and geographical renamings as part of the Decommunization process since 1989, though this has been inconsistent and sporadic. Several major cities in Russia restored their original names such as Gorky (Nizhny Novgorod), Kalinin (Tver) and Ordzhonikidze (Vladikavkaz) in 1990, and Leningrad (Saint Petersburg), Sverdlovsk (Yekaterinburg) and Kuybyshev (Samara) in 1991. Other smaller towns and cities, including closed cities, have adopted pre-Soviet or non-Soviet names such as Zagorsk (Sergiyev Posad), Krasnoyarsk-45 (Zelenogorsk), and Chelyabinsk-65 (Ozyorsk). Rybinsk's original name was restored in 1989 from Andropov after being renamed for Soviet leader Yuri Andropov upon his death in 1984, the second restoration since the city had been renamed Shcherbakov for Aleksandr Shcherbakov from 1946 to 1957. Sarov's original name was restored in 1995 after being variously known as Base 112, Site 550, Yasnogorsk, Kremlyov, Arzamas-75, and Arzamas-16 since it became a closed city for nuclear research in 1946.

Soviet symbols were removed from the façade of the Grand Kremlin Palace, but a finial of a red star remains at top of the spire of the Spasskaya Tower rather than the double-headed eagle. Both the red star and double-headed eagle are incorporated into the Banner of the Russian Armed Forces. Many streets and districts with communist names and statues of Vladimir Lenin are still ubiquitous throughout Russia. Major cities such as Ulyanovsk (Simbirsk), Tolyatti (Stavropol), and Kirov (Vyatka) have retained their Soviet names. In some cases, settlements have adopted new names, while administrative divisions named for them have retained their previous names. For example, Leningrad Oblast and Sverdlovsk Oblast are named for their capital cities which have since been renamed. Krasnogvardeysky District, Belgorod Oblast, is named for the town of Biryuch which was known as Krasnogvardeyskoye until 2007.

The State Anthem of the Russian Federation, adopted in 2000 (the same year Vladimir Putin began his first term as president of Russia), uses exactly the same music as the State Anthem of the Soviet Union, but with new lyrics written by Sergey Mikhalkov.

The Synod of Bishops of the Russian Orthodox Church Outside of Russia, referring to Vladimir Lenin as "the chief persecutor and tormentor of the 20th century," called for the removal of his body from Red Square and the liberation of settlements from Lenin monuments.

== See also ==
- Decommunization in Ukraine
- Lustration in Poland
