= Suvorov Square (Moscow) =

Square in Moscow, Russia

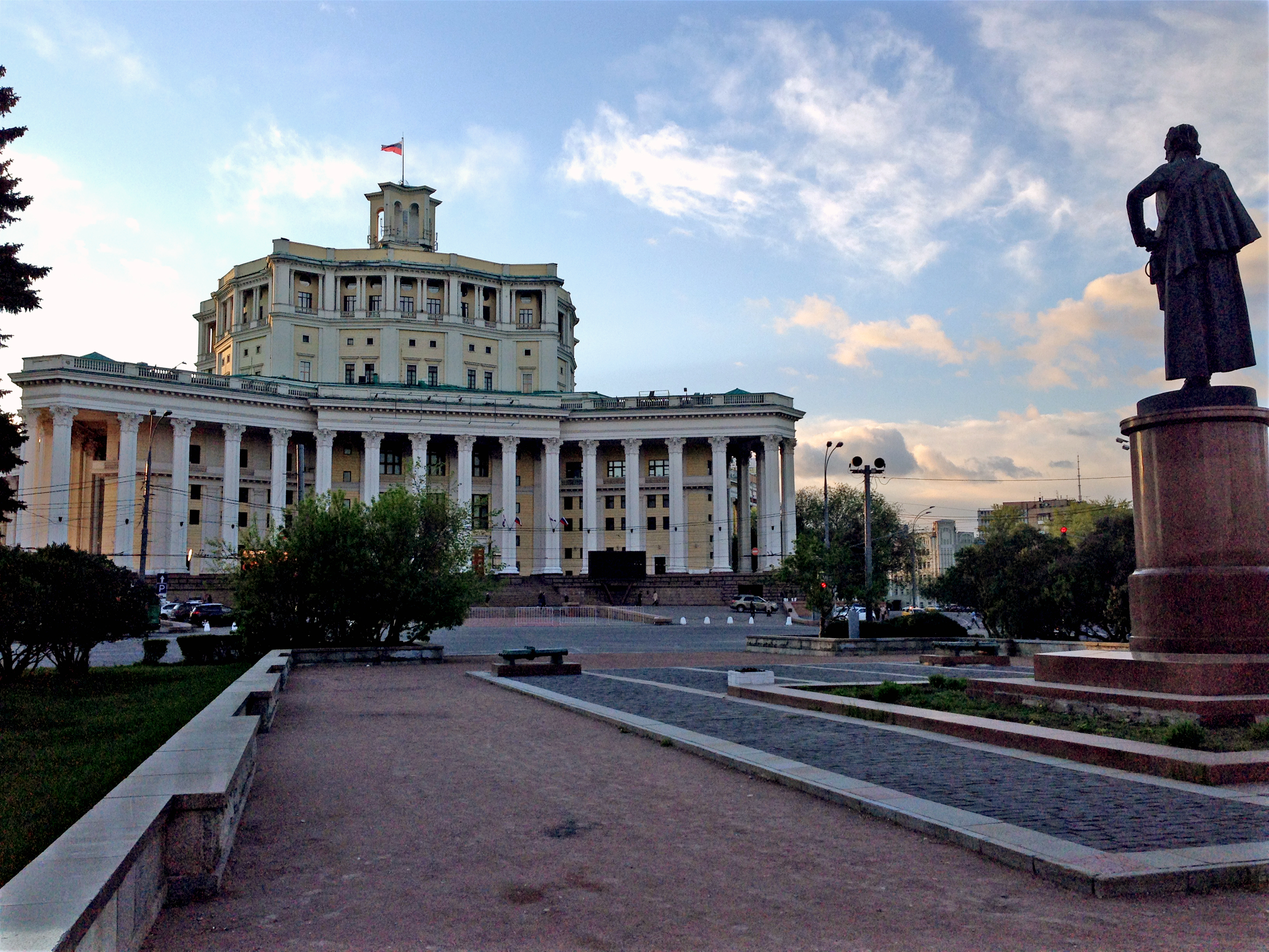
- Suvorov Monument and Russian Army Theatre
- Interactive map of Suvorov Square
- Native name: Суворовская площадь (Russian)
- Location: Moscow; Central Administrative Okrug; Meshchansky District
- Nearest metro station: Dostoevskaya
- Coordinates: 55.7813°N 37.6161°E

Suvorov Square (/sʊˈvɔːrɒv/ suu-VOR-ov; Russian: Суворовская площадь [sʊˈvorəfskəjə ˈpɫoɕːɪtʲ]) is a city square in Moscow, Russia. Specifically, it is located in the Meshchansky District of the Central Administrative Okrug of Moscow. Durov Street, Oktyabrskaya Street and Soviet Army Street are among the many streets that overlook the square.

== History and development ==
Until the 15th century, the Naprudnaya River bed was located on the site of the square. The development of the territory along the Naprudnaya stream began in the 16th century. Until 1917, the area was called Ekaterininskaya, where the Moscow School of the Order of St Catherine was located from 1802 to 1918. In the 1920s and 30s, the square was radically transformed. The Naprudnaya River was enclosed in a pipe all over, and a square appeared in the center of the square. The Church of St. John the Warrior was demolished in 1947, which was replaced by the predecessor of the now Slavyanka Hotel. Between 1935 and 1940, the Red Army Theater was built in the northern part of the square. In 1928, the building of the Catherine Institute was rebuilt and to house the Central House of the Red Army, where a bust of Mikhail Frunze was erected in front of the building. It was the renamed Commune Square in 1932 under the Soviet authorities in the RSFSR. In 1982, a monument to Russian military leader and national hero Alexander Suvorov was erected in the center of the square. In 1994, it was renamed once again to honor Suvorov.

== Landmarks, buildings and areas ==
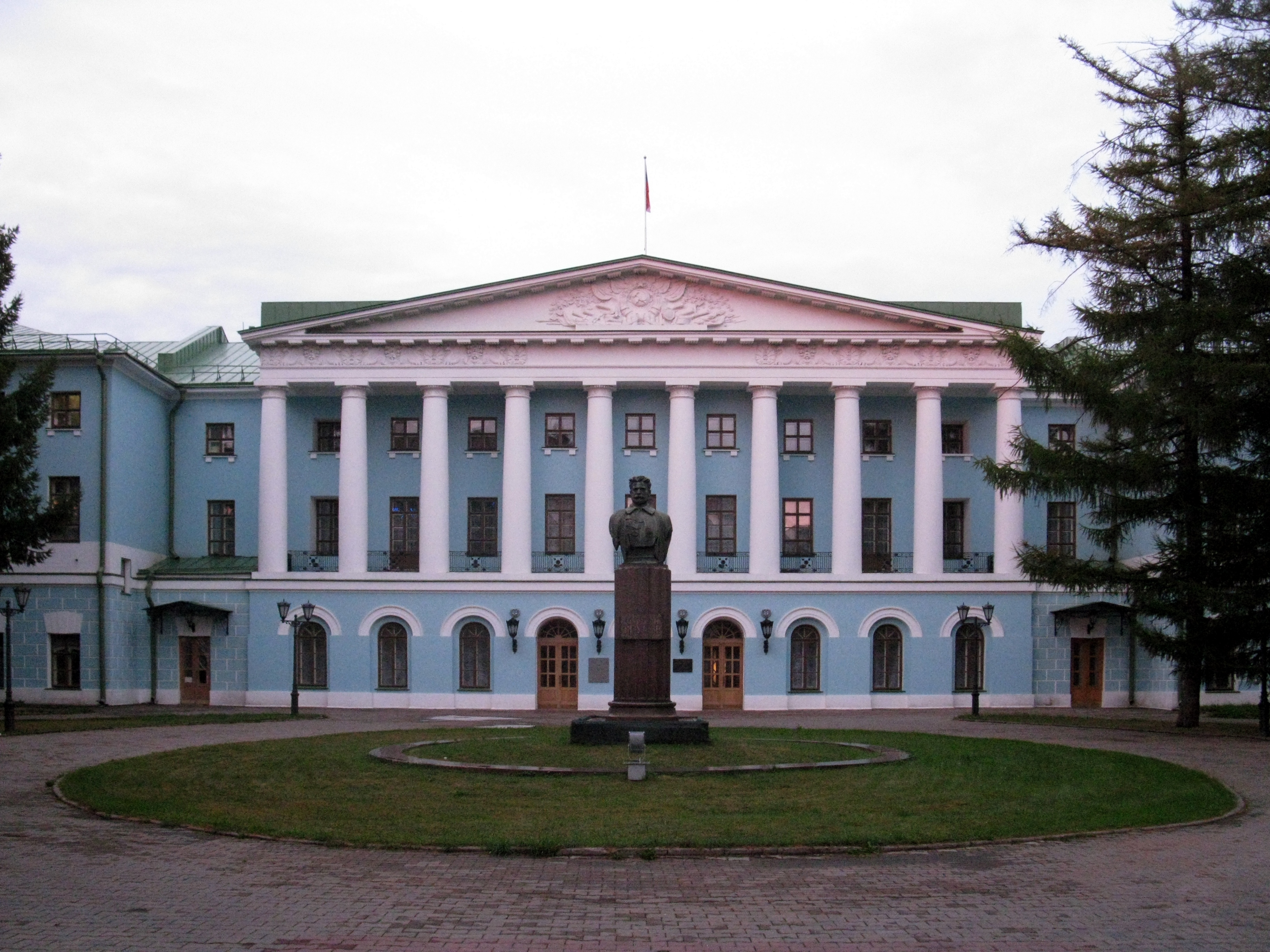
The Central House of Officers on Suvorov Square.

- Monument to Suvorov (built by Oleg Komov)
- Central House of Officers of the Russian Army
- Russian Army Theatre
- Slavyanka Hotel
- Suvorovskaya, metro station
- Yekaterininskiy Park
