= Central Armed Forces Museum =

Military museum in Moscow, Russia

Coordinates: 55°47′05″N 37°37′02″E

The Central Armed Forces Museum
- Russian: Центральный Музей Вооруженных сил
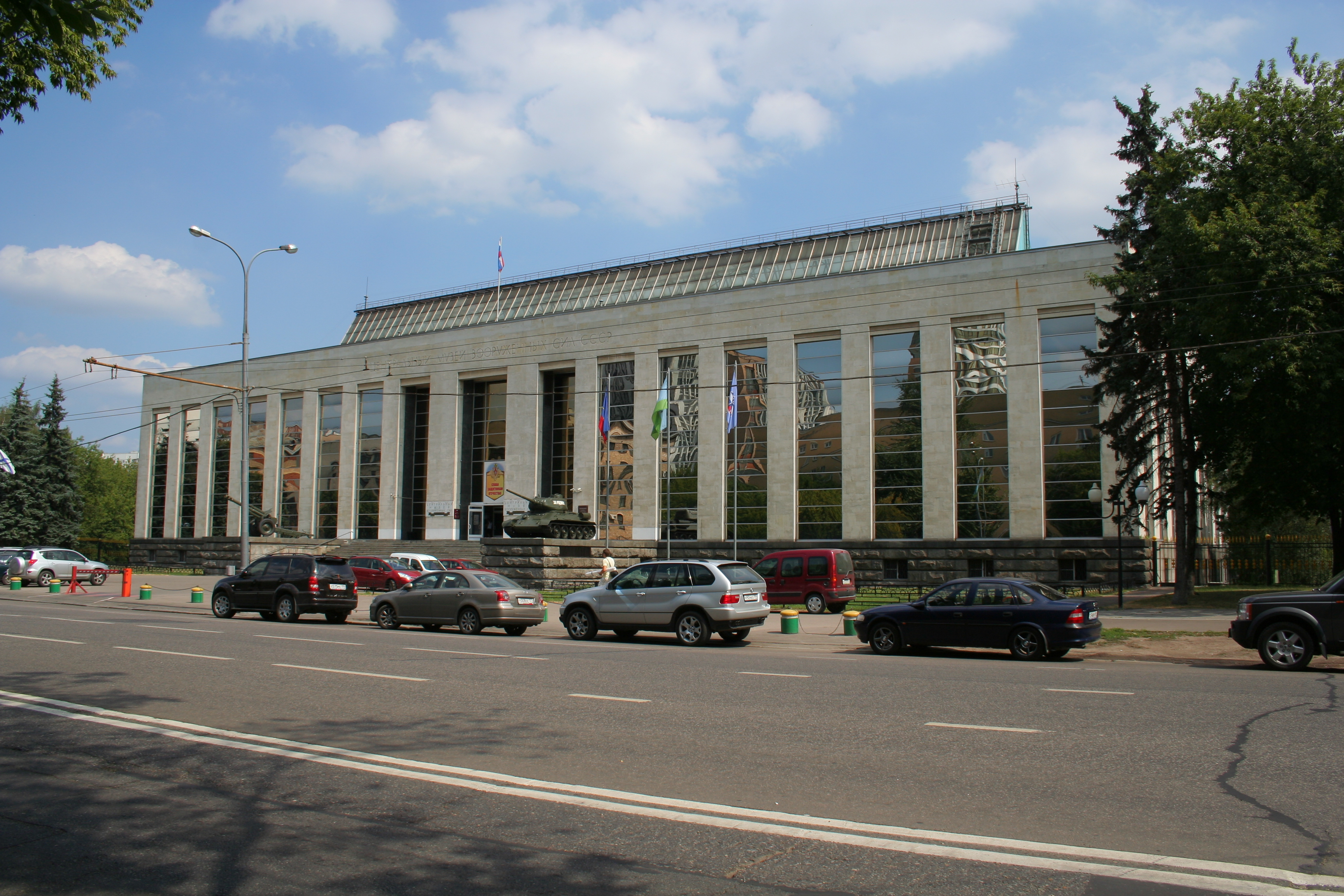
- Entrance to the Museum

- Location within Moscow
- Established: 25 May 1919
- Location: northern Moscow, Russia, near the Red Army Theater.

The Central Armed Forces Museum (Russian: Центральный Музей Вооруженных сил) also known as the Museum of the Soviet Army, is located in northern Moscow, Russia, next to Yekaterininskiy Park and across the road from Red Army Theater.

== History ==
The first exposition which showed the military condition of the Soviet Republic and the Red Army was organised in Moscow in the building of today's State Universal Store, and was opened by Vladimir Lenin on the 25 May 1919, following a parade in Red Square.

On 23 December 1919 an order was issued on the formation of a museum-exposition "Life of the Red Army and Fleet" in the same location, whose purpose was to Inform the public about the achievements by post-October Revolution Soviet Russia.

In 1920 another exhibition was organised and dedicated to the 2nd Congress of the Communist International in Moscow about the life and deeds of the Soviet Republic and its young armed forces which defend the conquests of the proletariat. In 1921 the exposition was transformed into the Museum of the Red Army and Fleet, and it was moved to Vozdvizhenka 6 in 1922, into a building (demolished in the 1930s), opposite today's Russian State Library.

In 1924, following the opening of similar museums across the country, it was renamed the Central museum of the Red Army and Fleet. It moved to the left wing of the Central House of the Red Army on the Yekaterinvskaya (now Suvorova), in 1928. In 1951 the museum was once again renamed the Central Museum of the Soviet Army and in 1965 moved to its present location. It was renamed once again the Central Museum of the Armed Forces of the USSR; it was given its present name in 1993.

== Exhibits ==
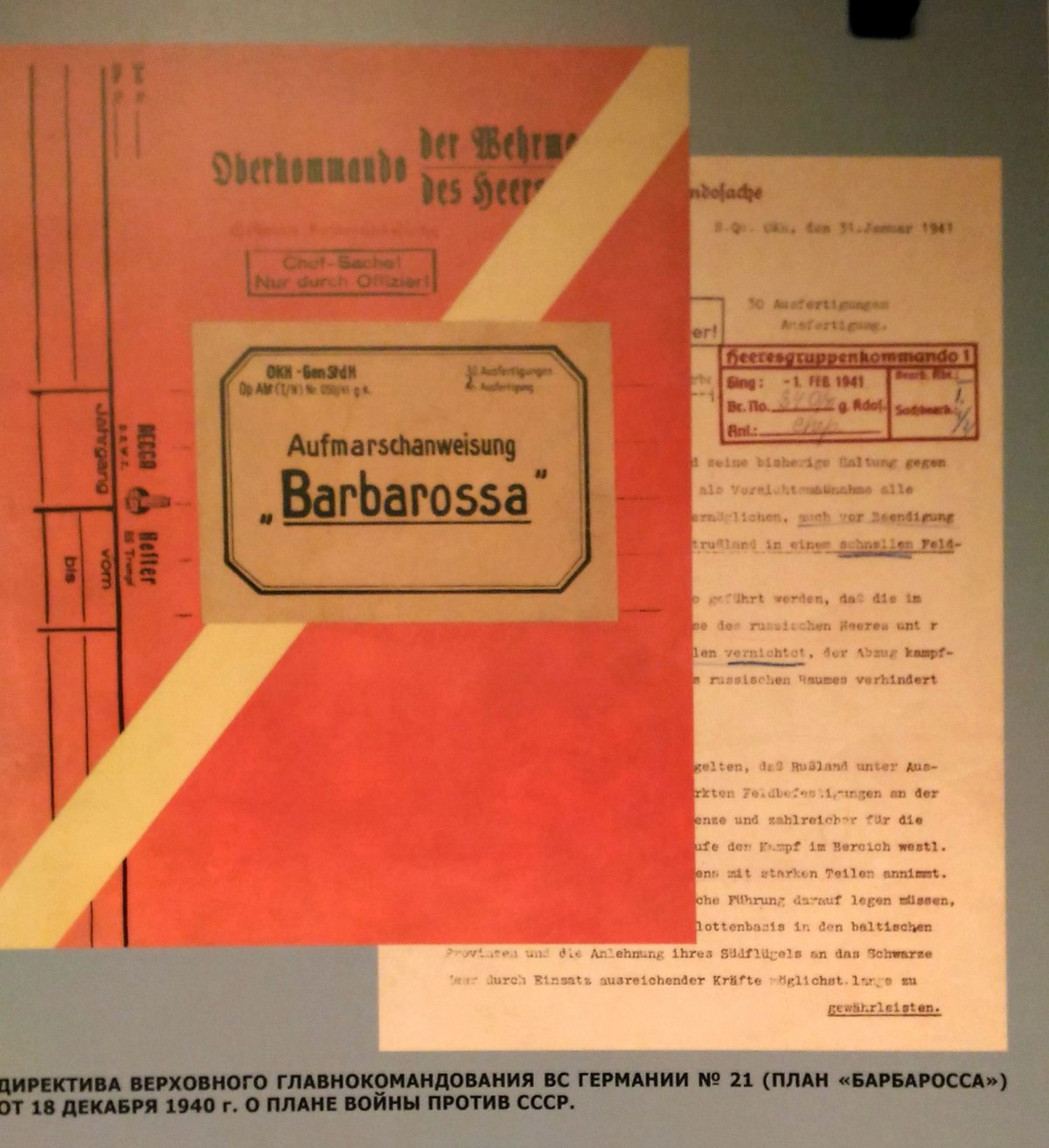
German troop deployment instruction for Operation Barbarossa.

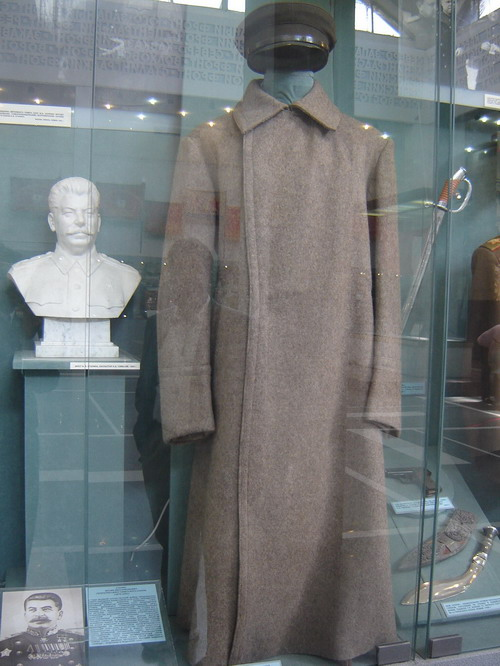
A hat and overcoat worn by Joseph Stalin

Part of the Great Patriotic War section is devoted to the Soviet Union's allies on the Western Front. There are examples of Soviet propaganda posters depicting Germany being crushed between the two fronts and maps of the Allied advance from Normandy into Germany. British and American small arms and uniforms are displayed. A life-size diorama includes a Jeep pulling a field-gun in front of a wall-sized photograph of Omaha Beach. The photograph is Omaha Beach as depicted in the movie The Longest Day (1962), not of Omaha Beach in June 1944. Among the collection are items that once belonged to Adolf Hitler and other Nazi officials.

The last halls display the post-war and modern developments of the Soviet Army and Navy, the Cold War section contains wreckage from the U-2 spy-plane that was piloted by Gary Powers and the involvement of Soviet forces in Cold War conflicts. A special display is dedicated to the Soviet involvement in Afghanistan and recent combat operations in Chechnya.

== Branches ==
The museum operates a number of other locations as branches:

- G.K. Zhukova Cabinet Museum
- Central Air Force Museum
- Strategic Missile Forces Museum
- Air Defense Forces Museum
- Airborne History Museum
- Military Uniform History Museum
- Stalin's Bunker Museum

== Gallery ==
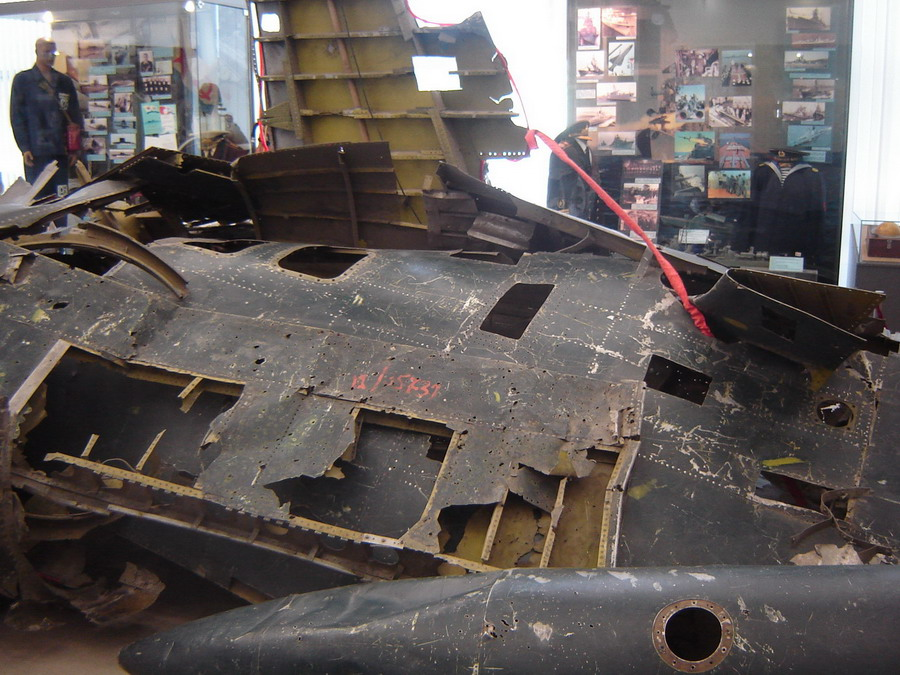
Wreckage of the Lockheed U-2 spy plane piloted by Gary Powers

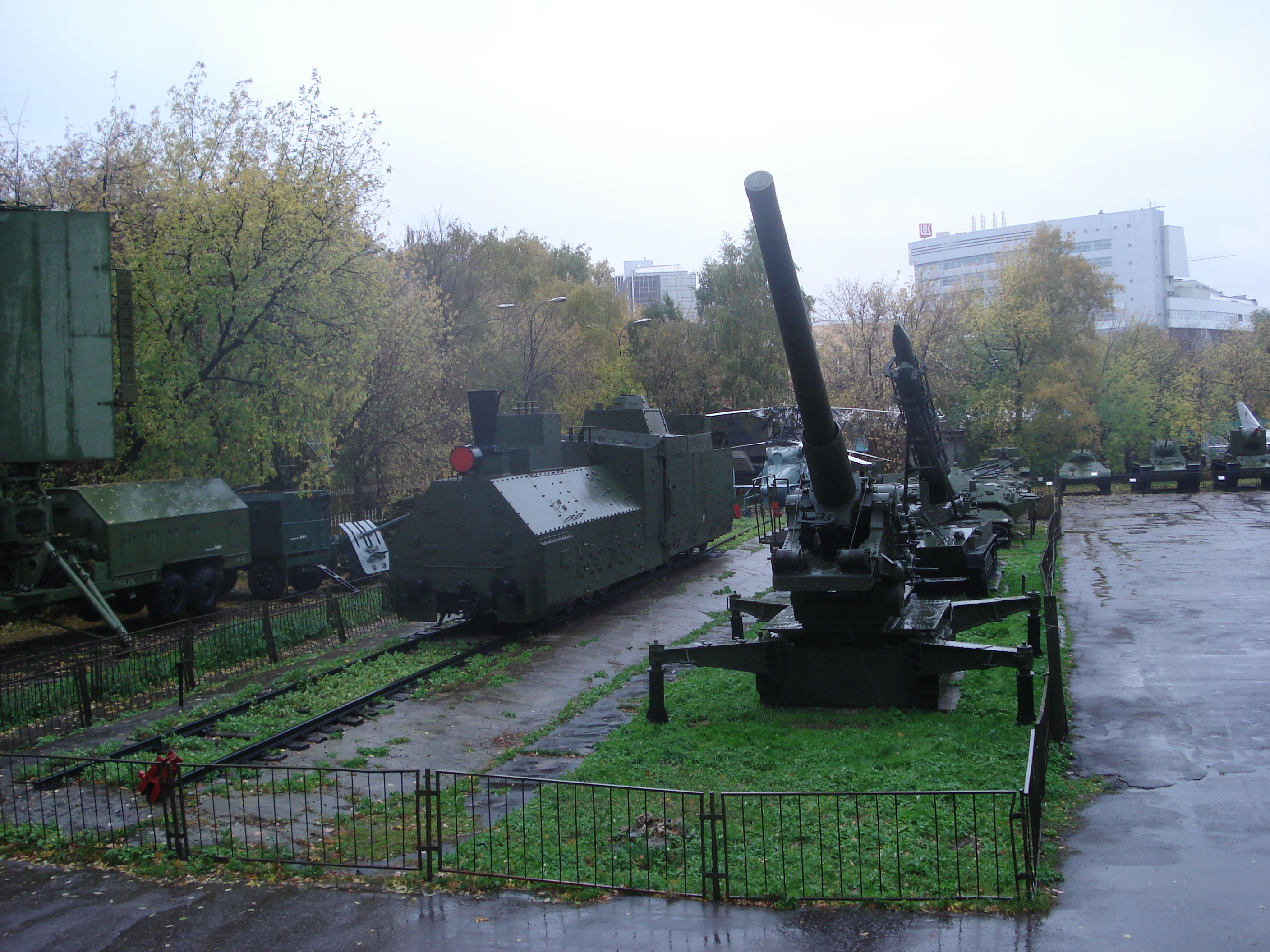
External exhibits including 0-8-0 Armoured locomotive Ov 5067
