= Central House of Officers of the Russian Army =

- Центральный дом Российской армии
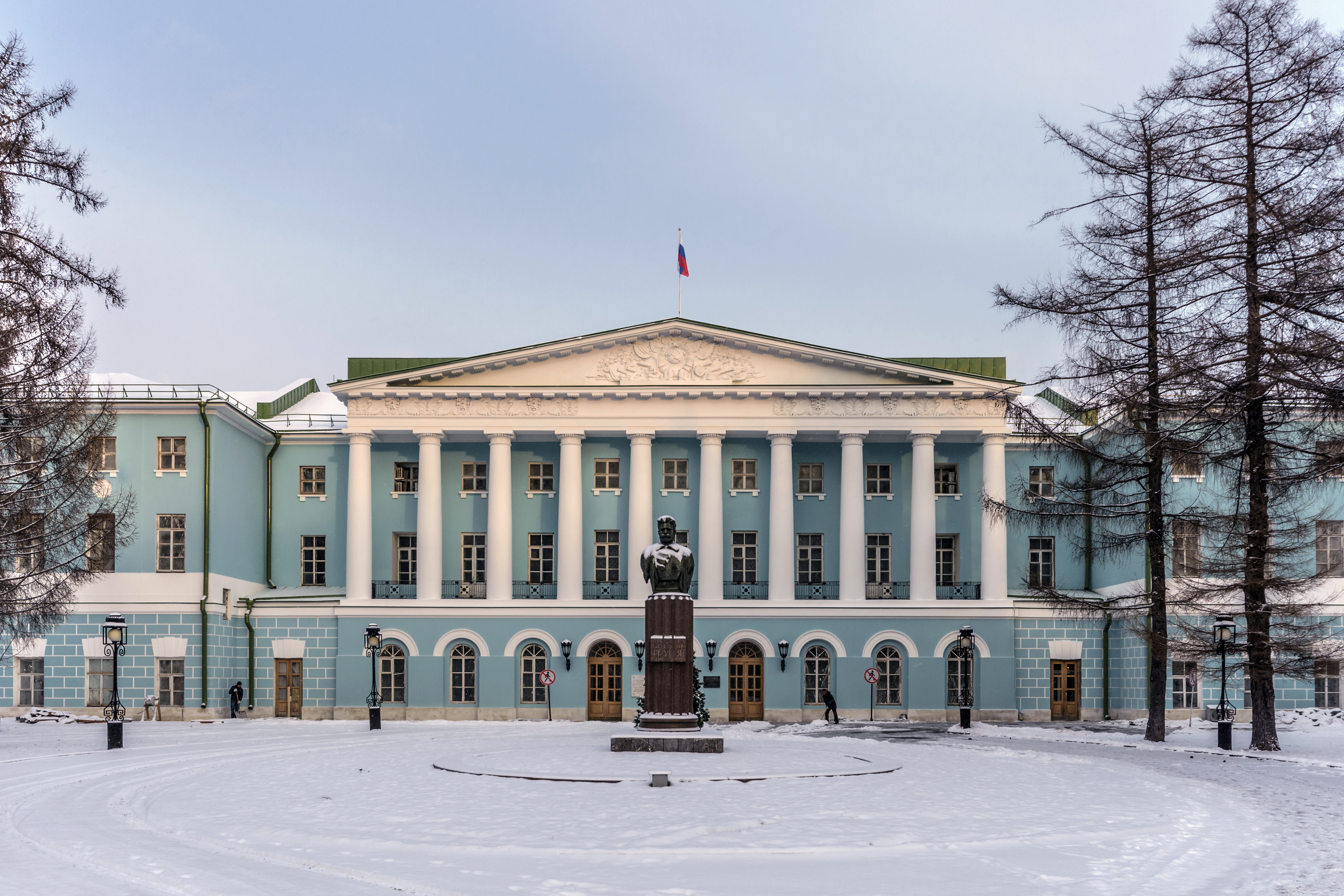
- The cultural center in the wintertime.
- Interactive map of the Central House of Officers of the Russian Army area
- Former names: House of Red Army

General information
- Architectural style: Neoclassical
- Location: Suvorov Square, Moscow, Russia
- Coordinates: 55°46′53″N 37°36′56″E
- Completed: 1779
- Inaugurated: 23 February 1928; 98 years ago
- Owner: Russian Defense Ministry

Design and construction
- Architect: Dmitry Ukhtomsky

The Mikhail Frunze Central House of Officers of the Russian Army (Russian: Центральный дом Российской армии имени Михаил Фрунзе, ЦДСА) also known formerly as the Cultural Center of the Russian Armed Forces (Russian: Культурного центра Вооруженных Сил Российской Федерации) is a Russian cultural center and cultural heritage site of the Russian Army located on Suvorov Square, Moscow. The center is designed to meet the spiritual, educational and cultural needs of servicemen and civilian personnel of the armed forces.

== History ==
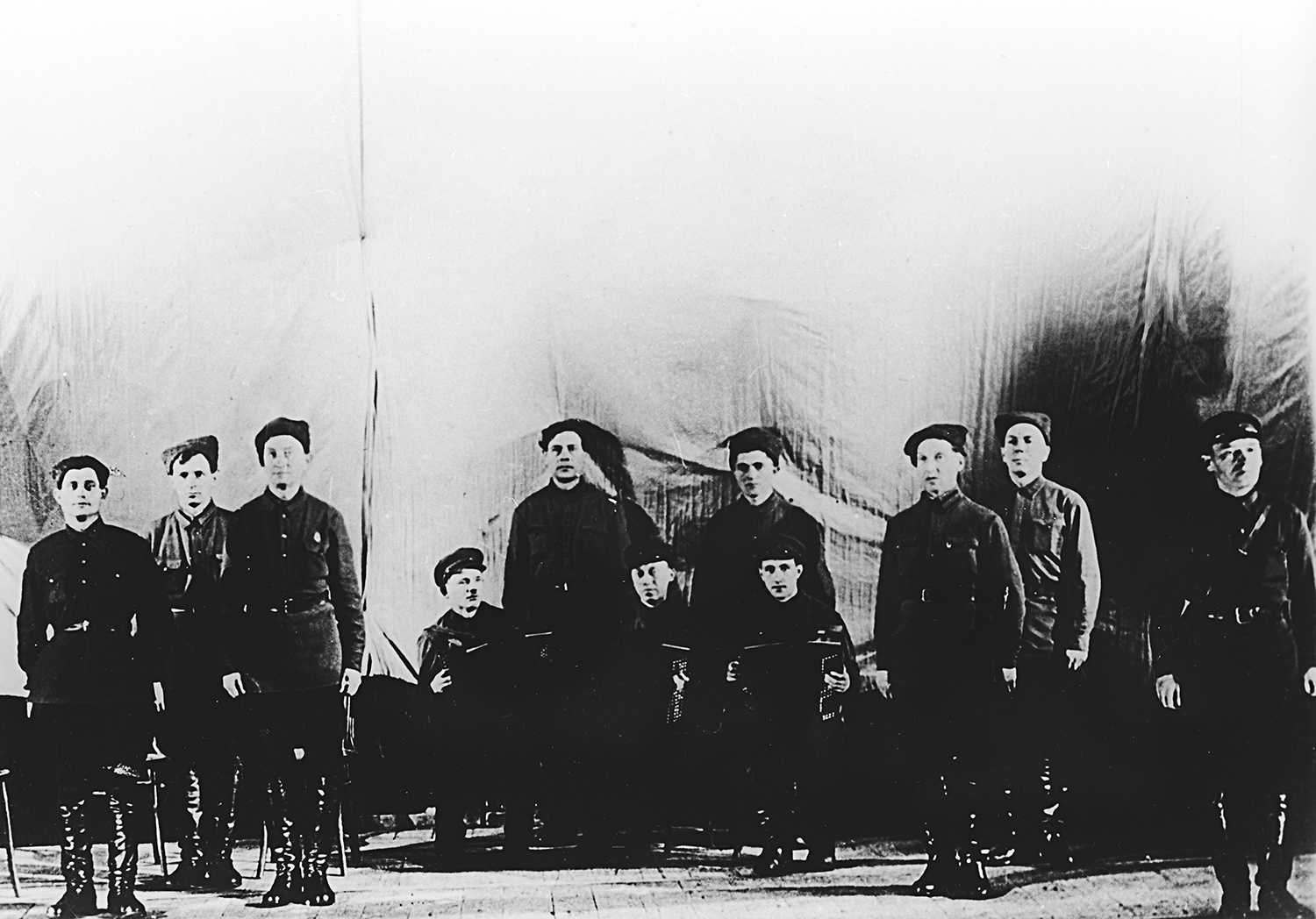
The original members of the center who are taking part in a musical ensemble, 12 October 1928.

In 1758, in the territory of what is today Suvorov Square and Yekaterininskiy Park, the country estate of Count Vladimir Semyonovich Saltykov was built. In 1802, the building which now houses the cultural center was home to the newly established Moscow School of the Order of St Catherine. The Revolutionary Military Council in late September 1927 decreed the formation of the Central House of the Red Army in order to meet the cultural needs of military personnel and their families. In the pre-war period, the following cultural/musical units were established in the officers' house:

- Russian Army Theatre
- Red Army Band (now the Central Military Band of the Ministry of Defense)
- Central Chess Club
- Red Army and Navy Museum (1928–1965)

The officers house also sponsored CSKA Moscow and impacted its development directly until 1953.

During the Great Patriotic War, the CDKA worked as a propaganda center for the Soviet Armed Forces, providing materials were made for political workers and other propagandists.

In 1993, the house was renamed to reflect the Russian Federation's newly acquired status as an independent nation. In 1997, the name was changed to the Cultural Center of the Armed Forces of the Russian Federation. By order of Minister of Defence Sergey Shoygu in June 2016, the name of the building was reverted to its historical name.

== The architectural aspect of the building ==
The ensemble of buildings has been a monument of architecture since the second half of the 18th century. The central part of the main building was erected in 1779. The building was reconstructed in 1802-1807 when the Catherine Institute moved there. A ten-column portico raised on an arcade was added to the central façade. The lateral axes of the building were enlarged and the end parts were joined with the existing annexes by a simple façade. In 1818-1827, the architects Domenico Gilardi and Afanasy Grigoriev enlarged the former mansion by adding new volumes to the end planes of the house. In 1918-1928, the building was restored according to the design of Sergei Toropov.

== Current condition and tasks ==
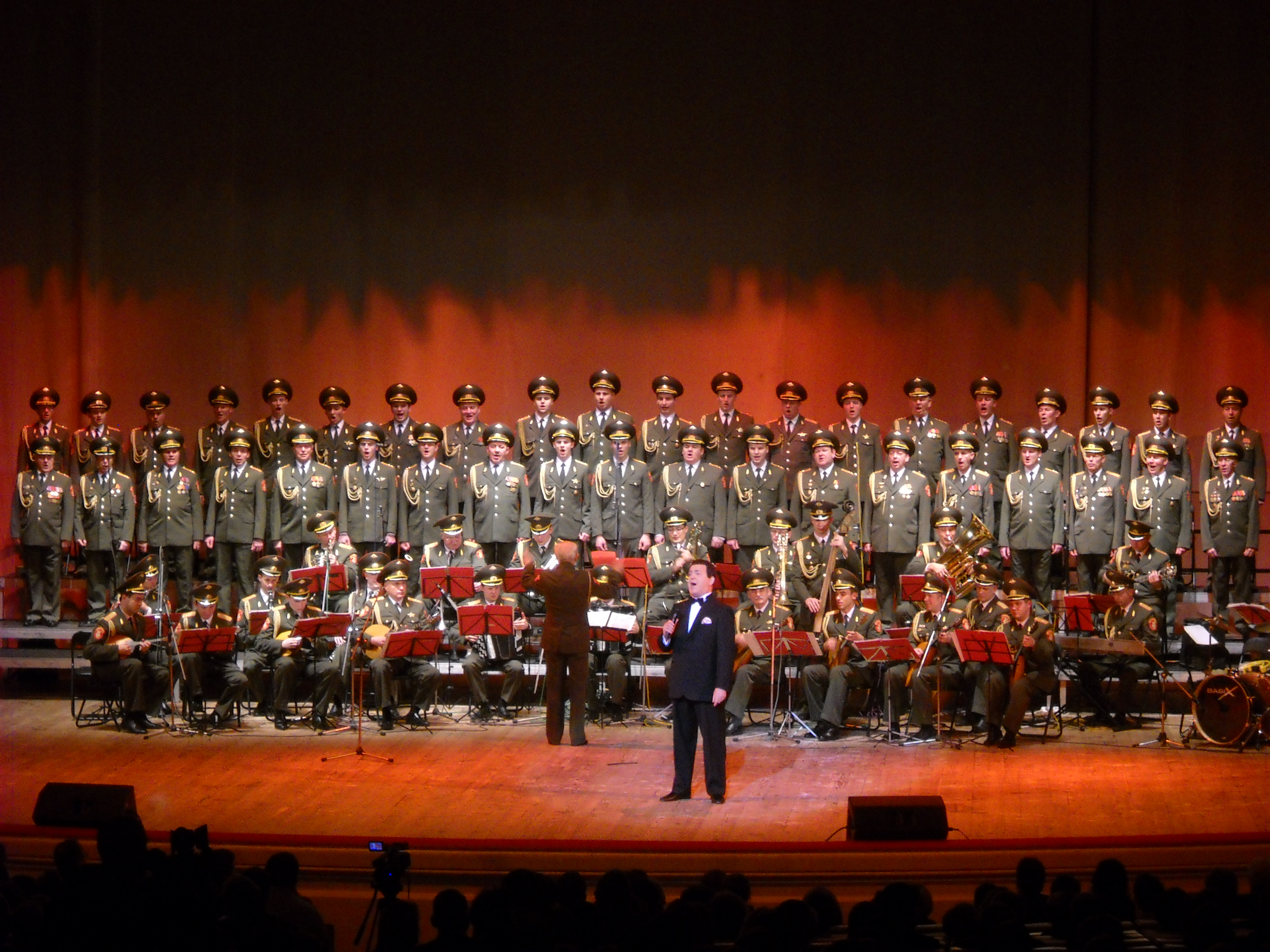
Joseph Kobzon and the Alexandrov Ensemble performing in the cultural center in 2009

The Central House of the Russian Army is a state budgetary institution under the direct control of the Russian Defense Ministry. To date, the house remains the main military cultural institution and methodological center of the army. Its employees actively participate in the entertainment of entire military units. As of 2017, there are about 20 clubs operating at the CSRA. Since 2017, the Central House of Officers has been headed by Vasily Mazurenko.

The building is commonly utilized on any public holiday in Russia.

=== Halls ===
The following concert halls function in the Central House of the Russian Army:

- The Red Banner Hall is a ceremonial reception room for guests, accommodating up to 600 guests.
- The Fireplace Room seats up to 120 people and usually hosts meetings of senior Russian officers.
- The Concert Hall has seating capacity of 400–600 and hosts concerts of visiting Russian military bands. It is equipped with modern lighting and sound equipment.
- The Malachite Living Room is designed for 100 guests.
- The Golden Living Room has a small capacity of about 20 people.
- The Red Living Room is intended for official meetings, musical events and can accommodate up to 80 people.
- The White Living Room is designed for small receptions of up to 100 people.
- The Chamber Hall can accommodate up to 200 guests.

== See also ==
- House of Military Officers
- Central Armed Forces Museum
