= Institute for Noble Maidens =

Type of Imperial Russian girls' school

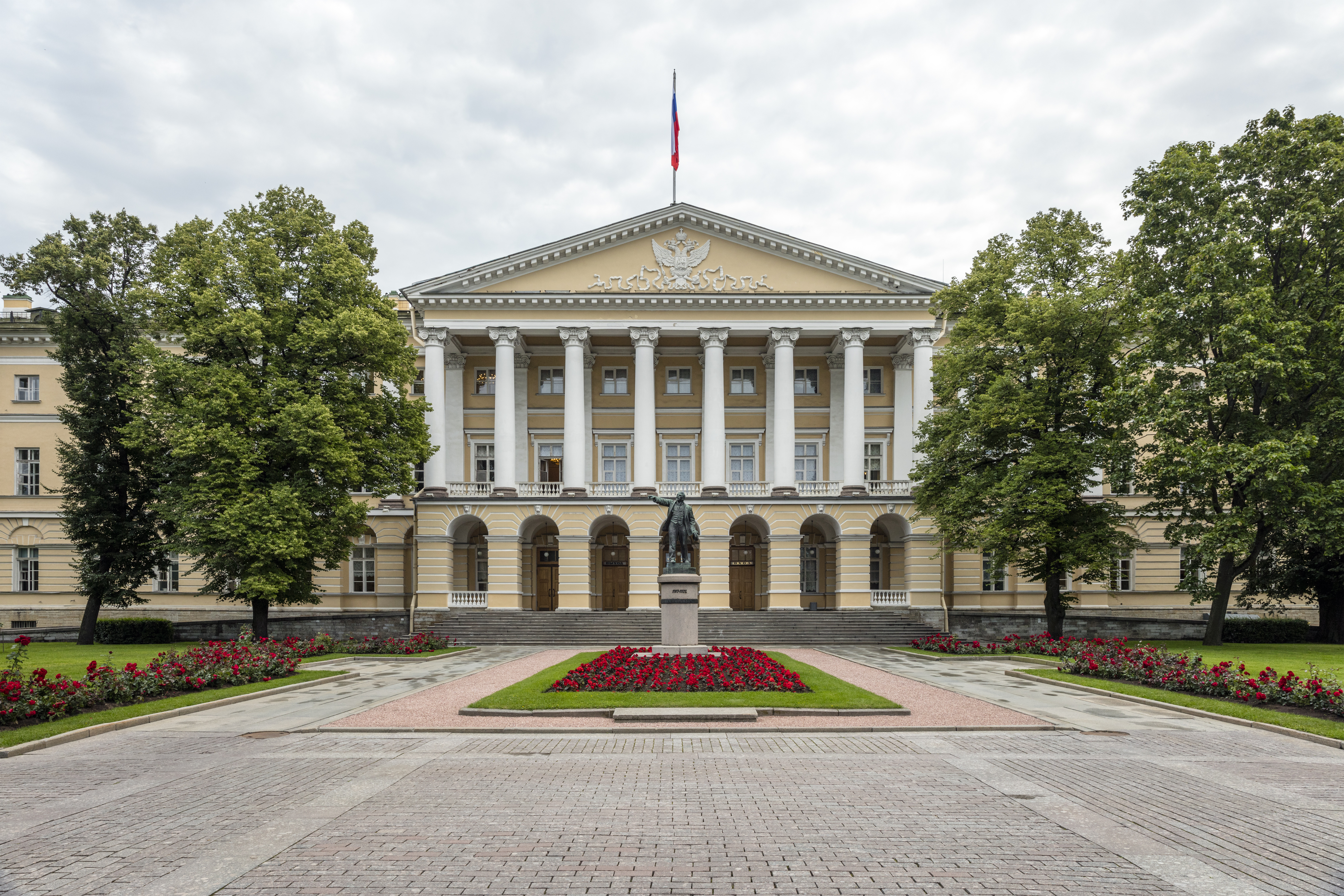
Contemporary view of the façade of the Smolny Institute in St. Petersburg, constructed as the model Institute for Noble Maidens.

An Institute for Noble Maidens (Russian: Институт благородных девиц) was a type of educational institution and finishing school in late Imperial Russia. It was devised by Ivan Betskoy as a female-only institution for girls of noble origin. Those were "Closed female institutes of the Office of the Institutions of Empress Maria". The first and most famous of these was the Smolny Institute of Noble Maidens in St. Petersburg.

== History ==
=== Origins ===
Secondary education for girls and a path to university education for women was extremely limited in Tsarist Russia. One path of educational training for the daughters of the Russian nobility were the Institutes for Noble Maidens (Instituti blagorodnykh devits), cloistered private academies which housed primary and secondary students and offered basic scholastic and cultural training.

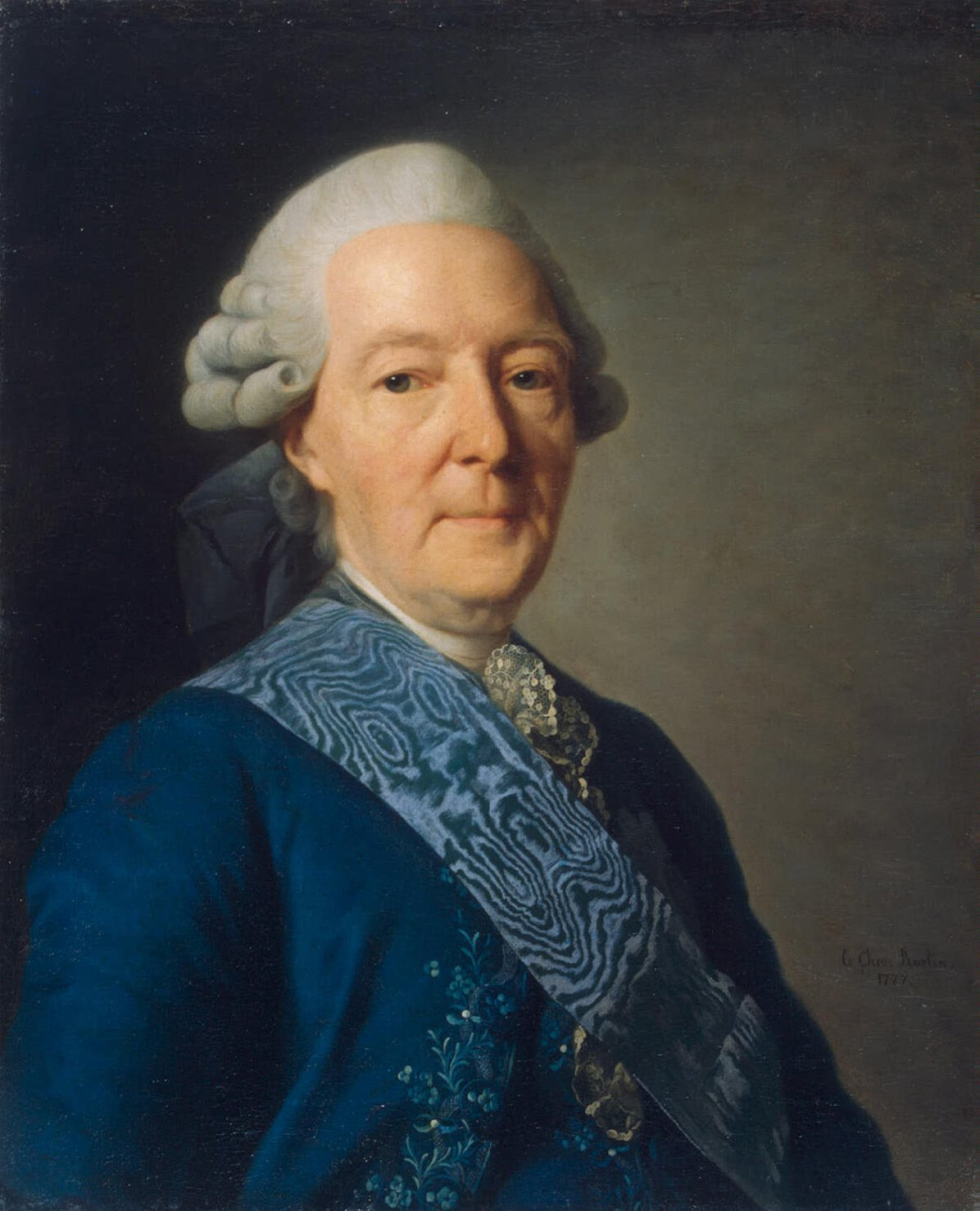
Ivan Betskoy (1704-1795), originator of the state boarding school concept which evolved into the Institutes for Noble Maidens.

The idea of the Institute for Noble Maidens dated to 1763, when Ivan Betskoy to Empress Catherine the Great a "Statute for the Education of the Youth of Both Sexes," which proposed the education of both sexes in state boarding schools aimed at creating a "new race of men." Boarding schools were to be preferred to other institutions of education in accordance with Rousseau's idea that "isolating the pupils enabled their tutors to protect them from the vices of society."

=== Regimen ===
An important memoir touching upon life at these facilities was left by populist leader Vera Figner, who attended the Rodionovsky Institute for Noble Girls in Kazan from 1863 until 1869. Figner found the educational regimen at the Rodionovsky Institute to be largely unsatisfactory, with instruction in literature avoiding controversial modern themes and history likewise skewed towards the ancient period rather than more modern events. Scientific instruction was said to be particularly paltry, with the zoology and botany instructor said to have

"...never showed us a skeleton, nor even a stuffed animal, and not a single plant. Never once did we look into a microscope, and we had not the remotest idea what a cell was...

On the other hand, for four years they tormented us over penmanship. For seven years we had to study drawing, notwithstanding the fact that during all that time not one of us displayed the smallest sign of talent."

No discussion of contentious contemporary events or civics took place, according to Figner's testimony, with "not a word...spoken about serfdom and the emancipation of the serfs; or about land allotments and the redemption of the land."

Time was carefully structured, and virtually no textbooks used according to Figner, with students compelled to copy and recopy handwritten notebooks. Only three hours of free time were allowed during the day, with the only structured physical activity consisting of one hour of dancing per week. Outside reading was not encouraged, with the only library at the Rodionovsky Institute kept behind locked doors by a dean of the school and access to books by students very tightly restricted.

Only six weeks a year were allowed for vacation time, according to Figner, during which the girls were allowed to return home — and even this limited respite was denied girls in the two years as they approached graduation to avoid the possibility of inculcation of alien ideas or cultural influences. As a result, Figner asserts, "at the time I left the Institute, my mind was entirely free from any social or political ideas whatsoever."

== List of Institutes for Noble Maidens ==
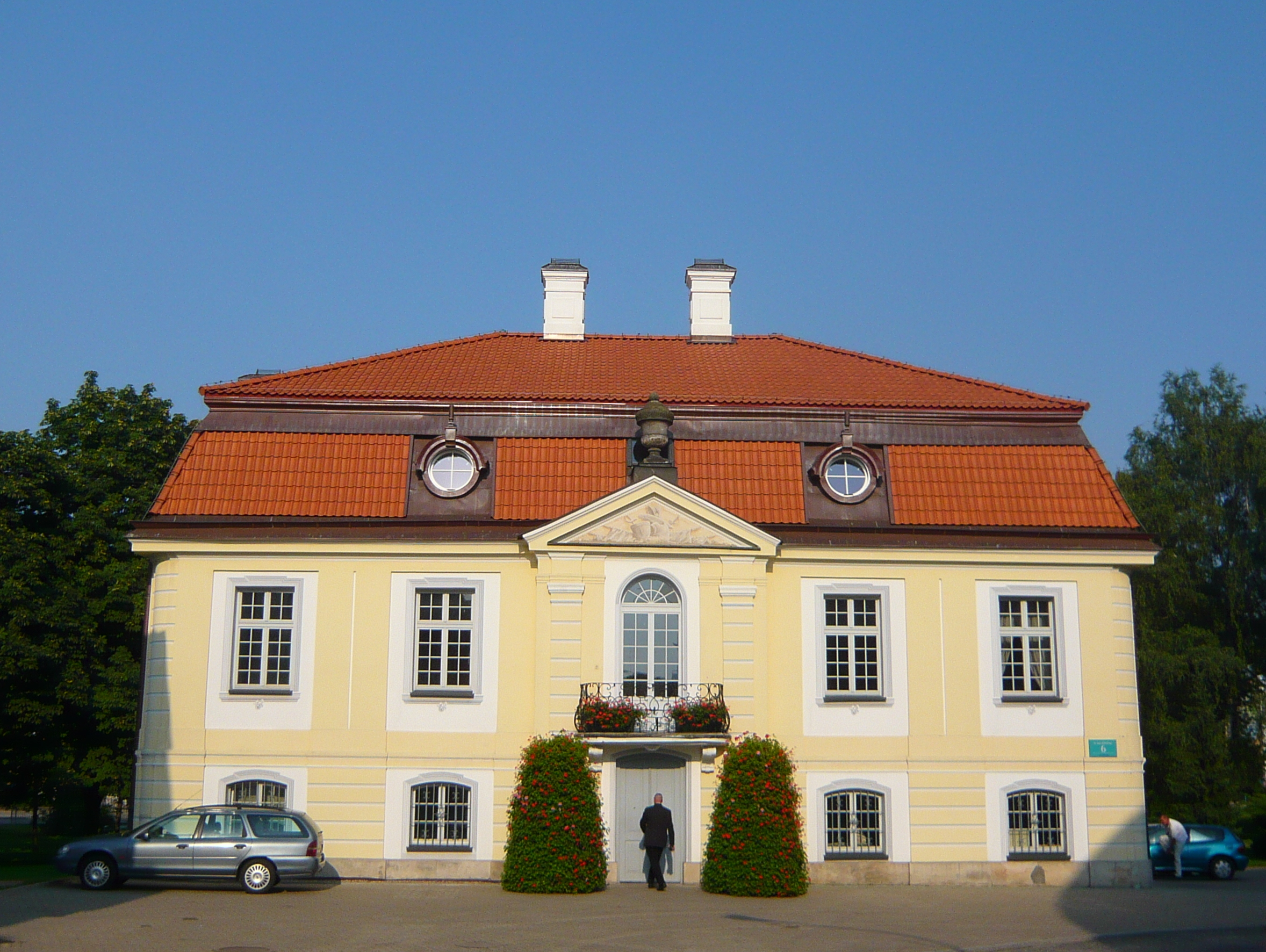
Contemporary view of the Białystok noble girls' school.

- Smolny Institute of Noble Maidens, St.Petersburg: 1764
- Catherine Institute, St.Petersburg: 1798
- Moscow School of the Order of St Catherine, Moscow: 1803
- Kharkov: 1812
- Kiev Institute for Noble Maidens, Kiev: 1838
- Białystok: initiated 1837, opened 1 November 1841 in former Tsar's palace
- Rodionovsky Institute for Noble Girls, Kazan: 1841
- Irkutsk: 1845
- Saratov: 1857
- Nizhniy Novgorod: established in 1852, moved to custom built building in 1858

== Alumnae ==
- Vera Figner (1852-1942), student at Kazan from 1863 to 1869, leader of the Narodnaya Volya (People's Will) terrorist organization
- Elena of Montenegro (1873-1952), later Queen Elena of Italy. Attended the Smolny Institute for Noble Maidens in St. Petersburg.
- Maria Vasillievna Pavlova (née Gortynskaia) (1854-1939) paleontologist and academician attended Kyiv
- Vera Popova (1867-1896), pioneer female chemist who died in a lab explosion.

== See also ==
- Finishing school
- Institute for Nobles
