= Banner of the Russian Armed Forces =

The Banner of the Russian Armed Forces (Russian: Знамя Вооружённых сил Российской Федерации, romanized: Znamya Vooruzhyonnykh cil Rossiyskoy Federatsii) is the official symbol and military relic of the Russian Armed Forces. The banner was established by Federal Law of the Russian Federation No. 162-FZ, dated December 29, 2000, "On the Banner of the Armed Forces of the Russian Federation, the Banner of the Navy, the Banners of Other Branches of the Armed Forces of the Russian Federation and the Banners of Other Troops".

== History ==
The Flag of the Soviet Union is the inspiration for the Russian Armed Forces' Banner.

After the collapse of the Soviet Union and the formation of the Russian Federation, it was necessary to create new symbols for the Russian Armed Forces which succeeded the Soviet Armed Forces. At the Scientific and Practical Military-Heraldic Conference in Moscow in 1999, General Sergei Ivanov spoke and reported on the desire of veterans of the Armed Forces to see the familiar Red Banner in the symbols of the Armed Forces. On December 8, 2000, Vladimir Putin sent to the State Duma a draft on the Laws on the Coat of arms, anthem, flag, and military banners. It was decided to make the Banner of the Armed Forces purely red, and the Banner of the Navy, the St. Andrew's Flag.

On May 8, 2001, President Putin ceremoniously presented the new Banner of the Russian Armed Forces to Minister of Defense Sergei Ivanov. This banner participated in the parade dedicated to the 56th anniversary of the victory in the Great Patriotic War. The banner was a red flag with a 2:3 aspect ratio. In a speech to the military on the occasion of the Defenders' of the Fatherland Day in February 2003, Sergei Ivanov promised to return the red star to military banners. Minister of Defense Sergei Ivanov proposed to make changes to the appearance of the Banner of the Armed Forces, and these proposals were supported by the President Vladimir Putin who submitted in May that year a bill to the State Duma based on the draft prepared by the Military Heraldic Service of the Ministry of Defense. The basis for the new appearance of the Banner of the Armed Forces were samples of the banners of the Imperial Russian Army of 1883, as well as early samples of the banners of the Soviet Army of the Soviet Armed Forces. The bill was adopted by the Federal Assembly and signed-into-law in July 2003.

== Description ==
The banner of the Russian Armed Forces consists of a double-sided cloth, a staff with a top, a bracket and a pedestal. The banner cloth is rectangular, red, with a red border. The banner cloth and the border are trimmed with gold braid. The width of the cloth is 130 centimeters, the length is 170 centimeters, with a reserve for fastening to the staff, made of red fabric. On the front side of the cloth, in the center, is the main figure of the Coat of arms of Russia: a golden double-headed eagle, raising its spread wings. The eagle is crowned with two small crowns and – above them – one large crown, connected by a ribbon. In the eagle's right paw is a sceptre, in the left – an orb. On the eagle's chest, in a red shield, is a silver horseman in a blue cloak on a silver horse, striking a black dragon with a silver spear, overturned on its back and trampled by the horse. In each corner of the cloth is a golden contour five-pointed star. In the border is a golden braided ornament.

On the reverse side of the cloth, in the center, is a military heraldic sign, the emblem of the Russian Armed Forces: a golden double-headed eagle with outstretched wings. In the eagle's right claw is a sword, in the left – a laurel wreath. On the eagle's chest is a shield topped with a crown. On the shield, on a red field, is a horseman striking a dragon with a spear. In the upper part of the border, the ornament is interrupted by the inscription: "FATHERLAND" (Russian: ОТЕЧЕСТВО), in the lower part of the border – "DUTY HONOR" (Russian: ДОЛГ ЧЕСТЬ). The inscriptions are made in golden letters, stylized as Old Slavonic script.
