= Moscow School of the Order of St Catherine =

Russian girls' school

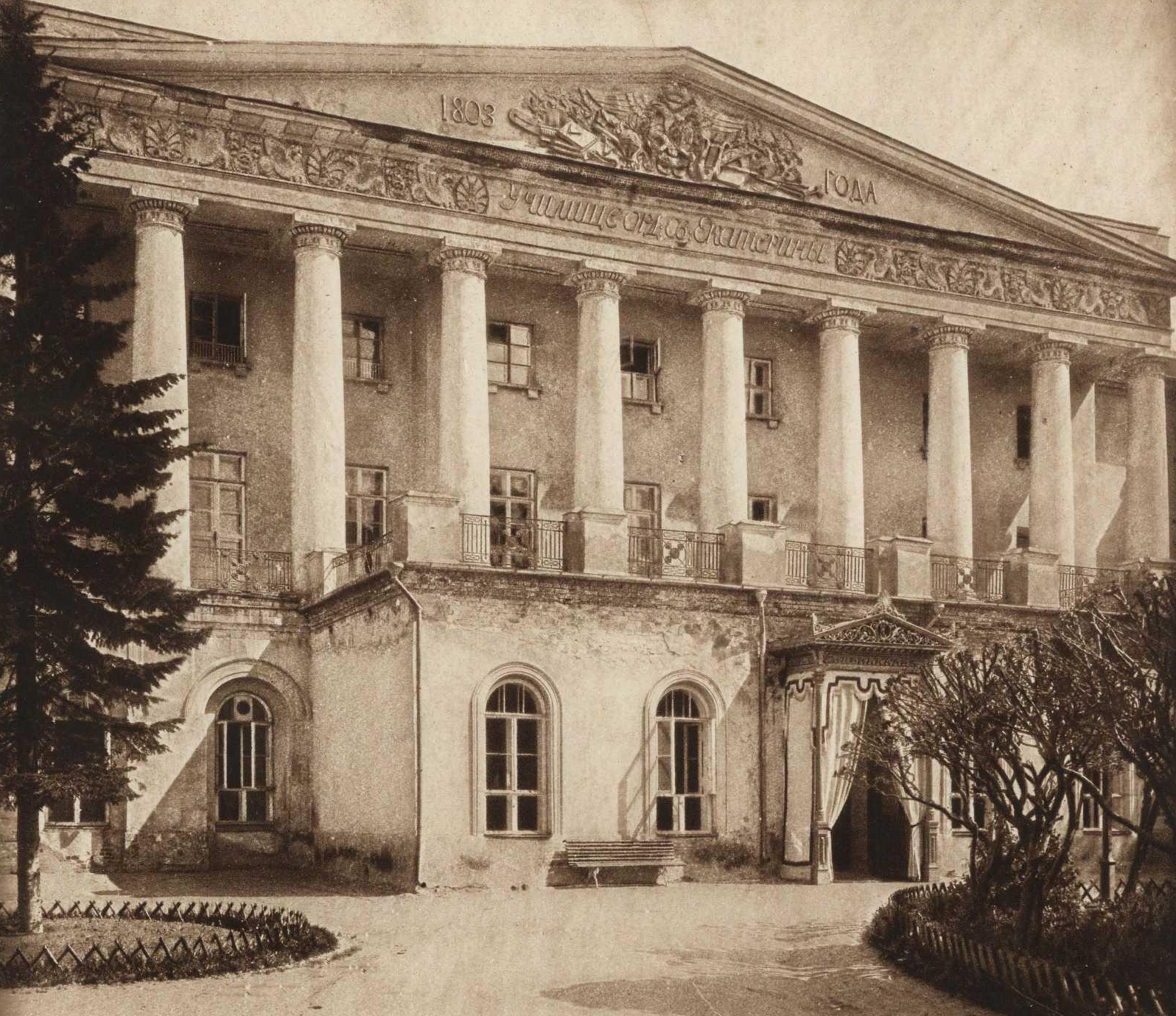
Moscow School of the Order of St Catherine

The Moscow School of the Order of St Catherine (Russian: Московское училище ордена Святой Екатерины) was a girls' school in Moscow, Russia, between 1802 and 1918. It was a fashionable girl school for students from noble and rich burgher families (divided in different classes until 1842). The building now houses the Central House of Officers of the Russian Army.

== See also ==
- Institute for Noble Maidens
