= Russian Army Theatre =

Theatre in Moscow, Russia

- Центральный академический театр Российской армии
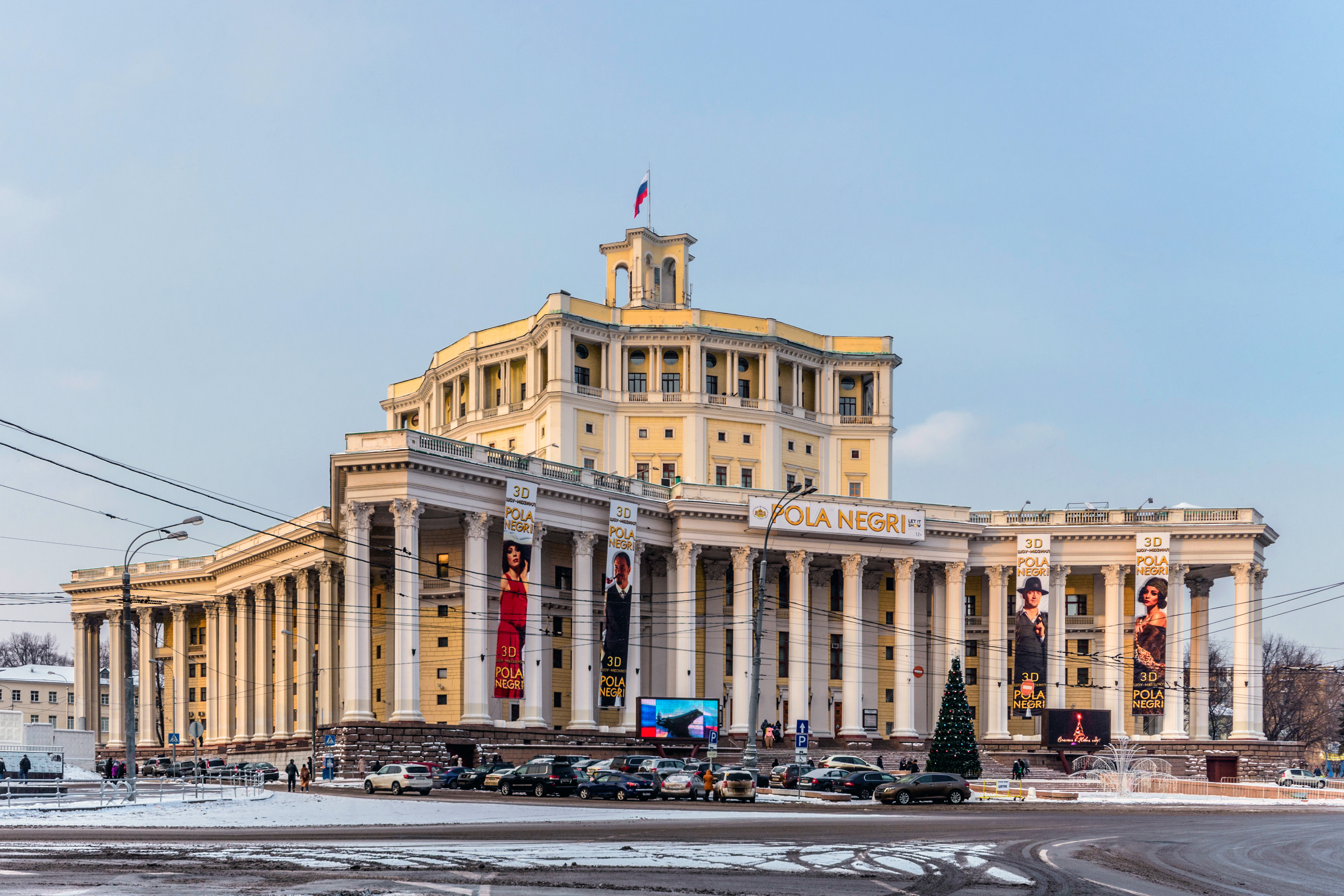
- Russian Army Theatre in 2016
- Interactive map of Russian Army Theatre
- Address: 2 Suvorov Square; Moscow; Russia
- Coordinates: 55°46′58.05″N 37°36′49.58″E
- Owner: Russian Ministry of Defence
- Type: repertory theatre

Construction
- Opened: 6 February 1930

Website
- www.teatrarmii.ru

The Central Academic Theatre of the Russian Army (Russian: Центральный академический театр Российской армии) is the largest theatre in Moscow. It was established on 6 February 1930 as the Red Army Theatre, was renamed the Soviet Army Theatre in 1951 and has always specialized in war-themed productions.

The huge building, dominating the Suvorov Square and scored to resemble a Soviet red star, was constructed between 1934 and 1940. This prime example of the Stalinist architecture was designed by Karo Halabyan and V. Simbirtsev. The theatre has been supposed to have the largest stage in all of Europe. It was large enough to host real tanks, cavalry and big models of ships. The auditorium has 1,900 seats.

The theatre's first and best known director, Aleksey Popov, staged some of the most monumental theatre productions in the Soviet Union. He was succeeded in 1963 by his son, Andrei Popov. The theatre's brightest stars included Lyudmila Kasatkina, Vladimir Zeldin, Nina Sazonova, Lyudmila Chursina, Larisa Golubkina, Nikolai Pastukhov, Boris Plotnikov, Fyodor Chekhankov, and Lyubov Dobrzhanskaya.
