= Maria Arkadyevna Stolypina =

Russian courtier

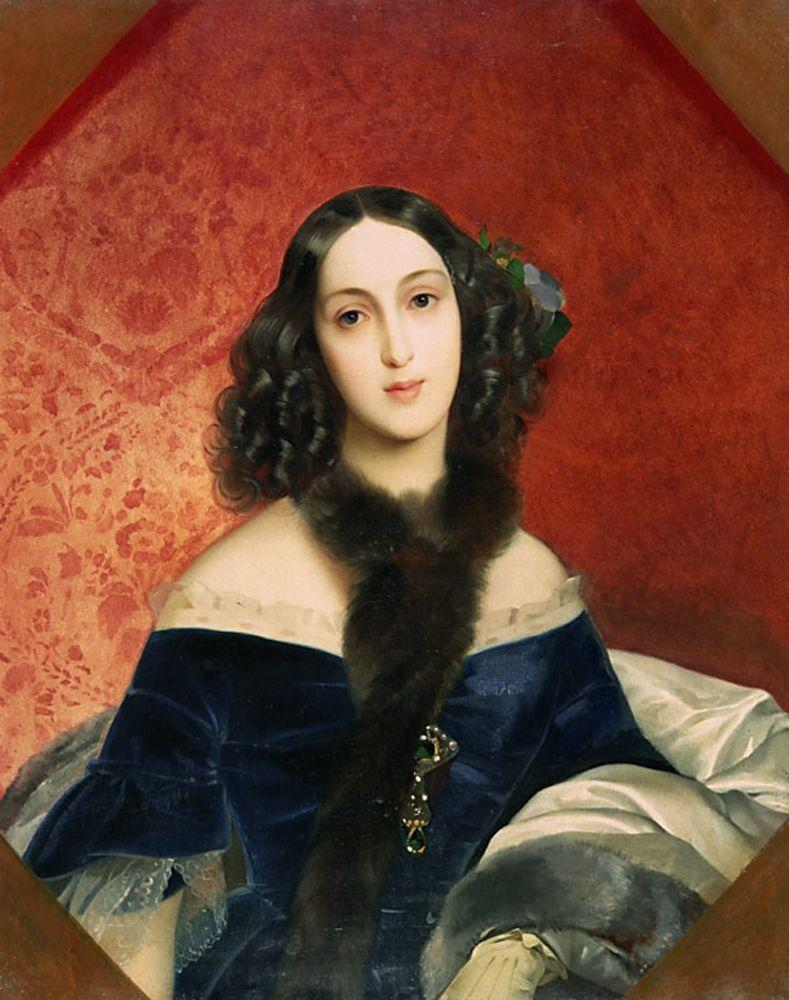
- By Karl Brullov, 1840
- Born: Мария Аркадьевна Столыпина; 12 October 1819; Saint Petersburg
- Died: 23 October 1889 (aged 70); Tiflis, Georgia
- Noble family: Stolypin
- Spouses: Ivan Alexandrovich Beck; Pavel Petrovich Vyazemsky
- Issue: Maria; Vera; Yekaterina Sheremeteva; Alexandra; Peter
- Father: Arkady Alekseevich Stolypin
- Mother: Vera Nikolaevna Mordvinova

Princess Maria Arkadyevna Vyazemskaya, née Stolypina, formerly Beck (12 October 1819 - 23 October 1889), was a Russian courtier, granddaughter of Admiral Nikolay Mordvinov, and cousin of the poet Mikhail Lermontov.

== Early life ==
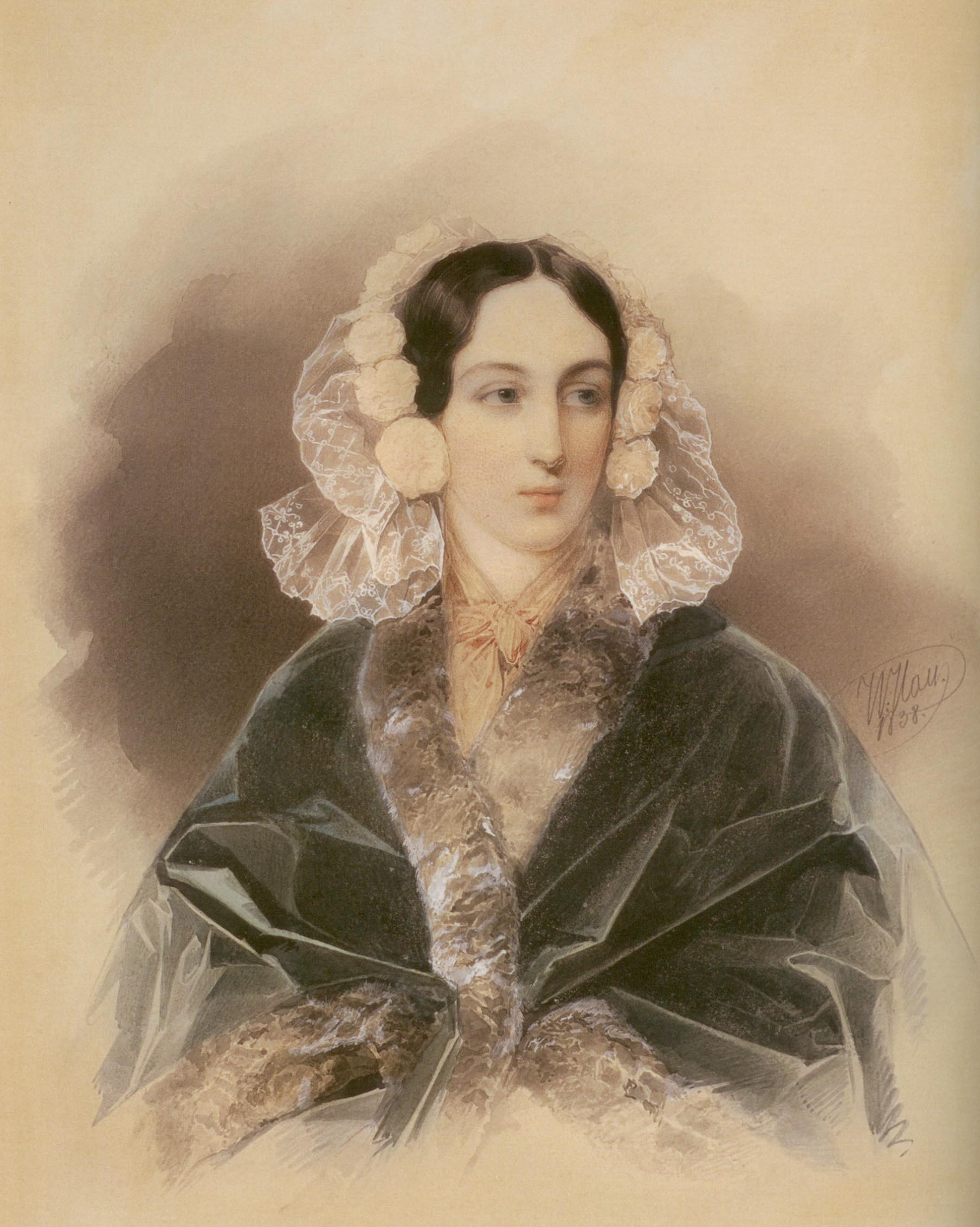
Maria Arkadyevna, 1838 by Vladimir Hau.

Maria was the eldest daughter of the author Decembrist Arkady Alekseevich Stolypin, and his wife, Vera Nikolaevna Mordvinova, born in Saint Petersburg and baptised on 22 October 1819, with her older brother as sponsor. The Stolypins had three daughters, and four sons, one of them, Alexei (1816-1858) was a close friend to Lermontov since childhood and served with him in the Russian Imperial Guard's Hussar regiment.

Maria was six years old when her father died unexpectedly on 7 May 1825. To support the family, Kondraty Ryleyev dedicated a poem to the young widow. Vera Nikolaevna was left with seven children aged between 9 years old and 8 months old. In the winter, they lived in Saint Petersburg and they summered at Nikolay Mordvinov's dacha near Peterhof. It was there in August 1832, that Maria first met her cousin Lermontov, then 18, who had just arrived from Moscow with his grandmother Elizaveta Alekseevna Arsenyeva.

Maria was fourteen years old when her mother died. Her aunt, Nadezhda Nikolaevna Mordvinova (1789-1882) recalled:

"Sister Vera Nikolaevna fell ill with nervous fever, and after a two week illness we lost her on 4 January 1834. The death of my dear sister struck my mother. This loss was sad for all of us; Mother's only consolation was raising my sister's orphans with her. They all moved in with us."

The Mordvinovs gave their grandchildren an excellent education. The Admiral was especially gentle with his granddaughters. The boys, he believed, should not be spoiled. The children were allowed to play freely, and were rarely punished. They were instilled with a love of literature, music, and painting. From childhood, they were taught good penmanship, especially in Russian. They were tasked with keeping a daily journal, and subsequently, Maria kept a diary and travel notes throughout her entire adult life. Maria was raised here under the supervision of Agrafena Vasilyevna Koftyreva, a graduate of the Smolny Institute, and a friend of her aunt, Nadezha. The house was a three storey stone mansion on the corner of Theatre Square and Nikolskays Street, and was visited by Vasily Zhukovsky, Grigory Kushelev, Alexander Shishkov, Alexander Voeykov, and Sergey Aksakov, amongst others.

== First marriage ==
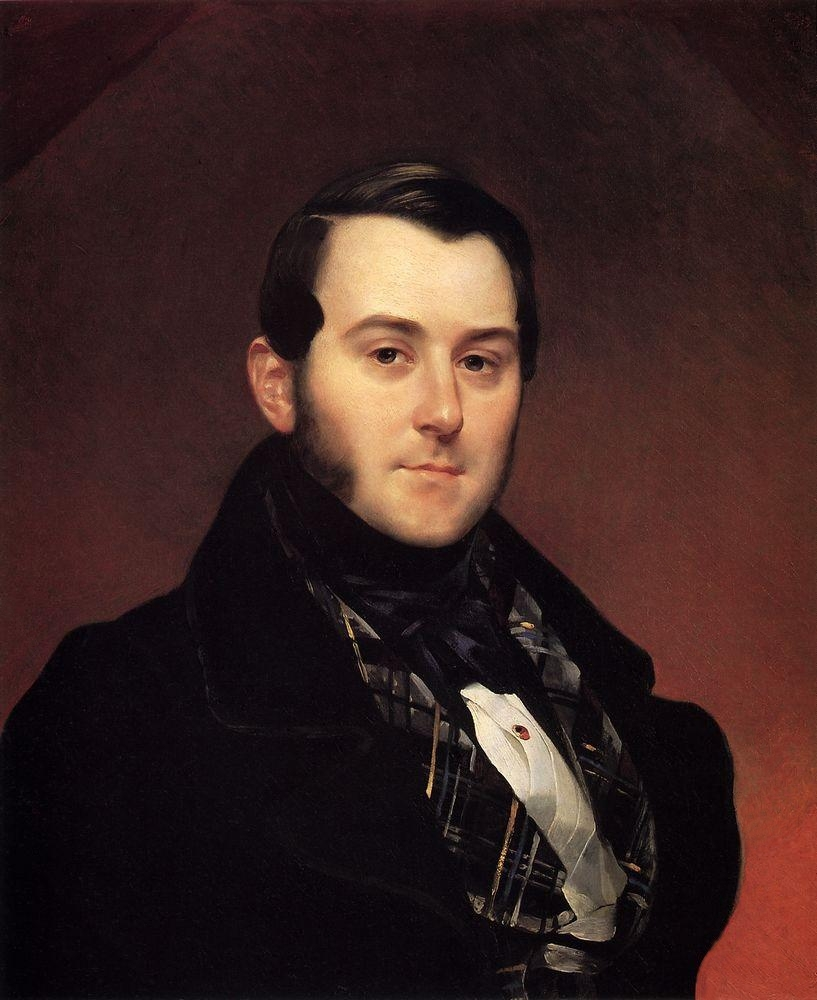
Ivan Alexandrovich Beck, c. 1839 by Karl Bryullov.

The Stolypins were distinguished by their beauty, Maria was not exception. She was said to have inherited her tall stature from her father and her English grandmother.

Upon her debutant, Maria Stolypina immediately attracted the attention of the court. Nicholas I, a connoisseur of female beauty, granted her the position of maid of honour at the end of 1836. Admiral Mordvinov, fearing where this would lead, decided to quickly marry her off. At first, she was only allowed into the palace during the day so that she may return to her grandparents every evening. Later, she had to move into the palace. Later, in March of 1839, Mordinov reluctantly gave his consent to the appointment of his youngest granddaughter, Vera Stolypina, as maid of honour to Grand Duchess Alexandra.

At the beginning of 1837, Maria Arkyadyevna became the bride of the wealthy landowner Ivan Alexandrovich Beck (1807-1842). Her son-in-law, Sergei Dmitrievich Sheremetev wrote:

"She didn't know her future groom. He visited the Mordvinovs' house, where they loved him, but she never thought about him. She was barely 17 years old, and she was still sitting at her lessons when they sent her to say that Henrietta Alexandrovna Mordvinova was calling her, who immediately announced to her that she should marry the groom she had chosen, I. A. Beck. Maria Arkadyevna was confused, almost cried and did not immediately understand what was happening. The groom was introduced, no objections were allowed, and the wedding took place."

The wedding took place on 8 November 1837 in St. Isaac's Catherdral. The witness for the groom was Alexey Petrovich Lazarev, the witnesses for the bride were, Leonty Vasilyevich Dubelt and Prince Mikhail Alexandrovich Dondukov-Korsakov. Ivan Beck served in the Collegium of Foreign Affairs and was in the diplomatic service in Holland at the same time as Prince Vyazemsky, who later married his widow.

Beck was a gifted person, he studied painting and music. He was a poet, writing on the topic of love, and one of the first to translate "Faust" by Goethe into Russian. Contemporaries noted his skill and command of poetic language. He was friends with Alexander Turgenev and Ivan Kozlov.

The marriage was short lived and did not bring Maria much happiness. Beck became ill and went mad, which manifested violently. Unable to cope, he died on 23 April 1842, and was buried in the Alexander Nevsky Lavra, at the Lazarevskoye cemetery.

Maria Arkadyevna was left with two children by him, both daughters, Maria and Vera. They inherited their father's penchant for poetry and art. Having been widowed at only 23, the family returned to the house of Admiral Mordvinov. Agrafena Koftyreva helped her raise the children.

== Second marriage ==
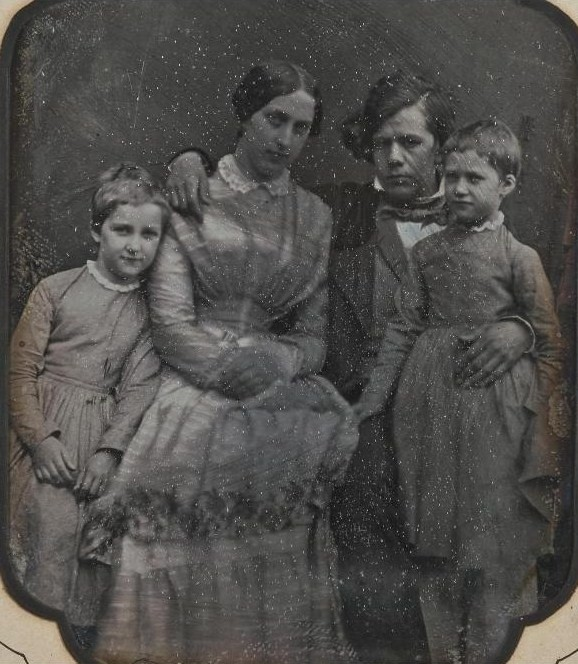
Maria Arkadyevna with her second husband and daughters Maria and Vera.

After the death of Beck, Maria Arkadyevna inherited a large fortune, together with a rich dowry received from her parents. She led the usual social life, attended court, and private balls. In May 1847, she and her young daughters went abroad to visit Constantinople, where her sister Vera lived with her husband, Prince D. F. Golitsy, who served at the Russian mission. There, she met her second husband, Prince Pavel Petrovich Vyazemsky, who was the assistant secretary for the Asian Department of the Ministry of Foreign Affairs.

In his free time from service, he enjoyed exploring the surrounding area, taking walks with Maria Arkadyevna. Meetings and visits to historical places contributed to the rapid development of their relationship. Soon, to the displeasure of her family, Maria became his bride. Pavel Petrovich gave 'his sun' as he called her, books and souvenirs. He introduced her to his parents through letters. His father, the poet Pyotr Vyazemsky became convinced his son's choice was successful, writing "She is a beauty, well-behaved in face and soul, pious...".

Pavel and Maria were married in Constantinople on 17 October 1848. After the wedding, they settled in the Russian Embassy, which had a view of the Bosporus and a large garden. There in 1849, their first child, Ekaterina, was born. Vyazemsky became a father figure to Vera and Maria Beck, he taught them science and art.

In December 1858, Vyazemsky was transferred to The Hague, and later in Karlsruhe and Vienna. In 1857, the family returned to Saint Petersburg, where Maria would become a maid of honour to Maria Alexandrovna, with whom she was close. Her youngest daughters, Ekaterina and Alexandra, were classmates and Friends of Grand Duchess Maria Alexandrovna.

The family spend the summer months on their Ostafyevo estate and spent winters in Saint Petersburg. Maria Arkaadyevna was engaged in the economic affairs and education of peasant children. In 1867 she funded a school that was built on the estate.

In the 1870's, Maria Arkadyevna lived abroad in Germany, Switzerland, and France. In 1874, she was granted the title of Hofmeisterin to Grand Duchess Maria Pavlovna. In 1878 she was granted the Order of Saint Catherine (small cross). Maria's good friend, and fellow maid of honour, Alexandra Andreevna Tolstaya, characterised her as a passionate person in her feelings, faithful and straightforward. She was active in the Russian Red Cross Society, for which she was awarded the Red Cross Insignia and elected 'Chairwoman of the Ladies' Infirmary Committee'.

Maria Arkadyeva died a year after her husband in Tbilisi from a heart attack and was buried next to her husband at the Tikhvin cemetery of the Alexander Nevsky Lavra.

== Issue ==
From her first marriage to Ivan Alexandrovich Beck (1807-1842) she had two daughters:

- Maria (3 January 1839 - 9 May 1866), married Count Alexander Nikolaevich Lamzdorf (1835 - 1902) and had issue.
- Vera (28 July 1841 - 16 May 1912), married Prince Dmitri Sergeevich Gorchakov (1828 - 1907) and had issue.

From her second marriage to Pavel Petrovich Vyazemsky (1820 - 1888), she had two daughters and one son:

- Ekaterina (20 September 1849 - 24 January 1929), maid of honour and state lady. Married Count Sergei Dimitrievich Sheremetev (1844 - 1918) and had issue.
- Alexandra (1 January 1851 - 1929) maid of honour, married Dmitry Sipyagin (1853 - 1902)
- Peter (5 December 1854 - 1931) adjutant of Grand Duke Michael Nikolaevich of Russia, and participant in the Russo-Turkish War.
Children

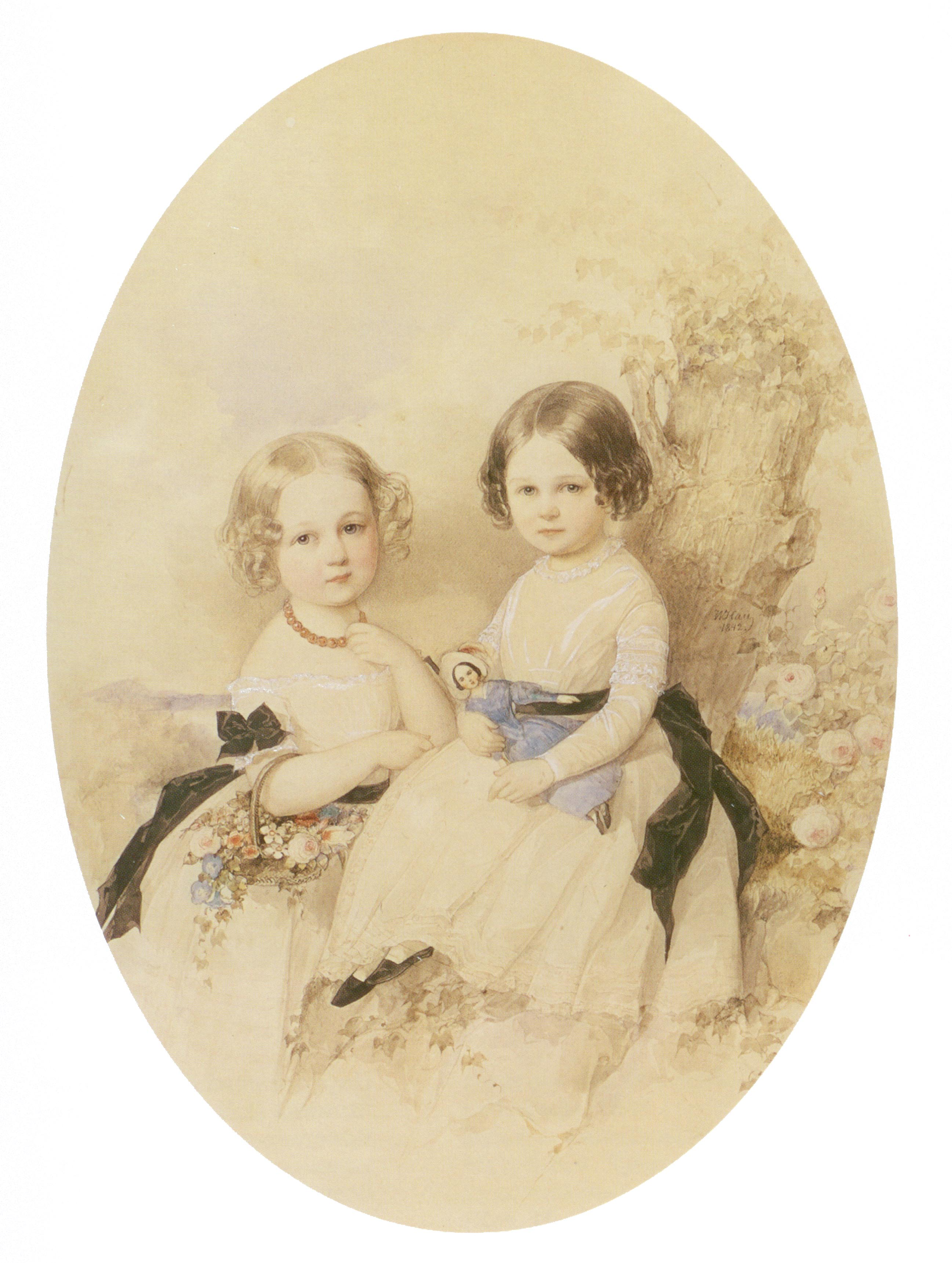
Maria and Vera Beck

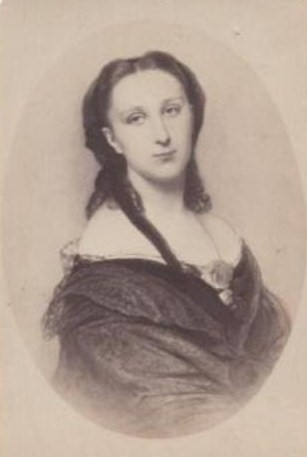
Maria

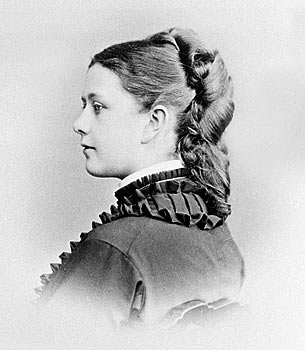
Ekaterina

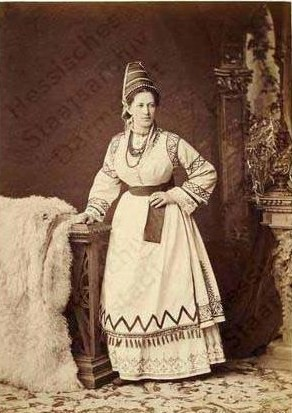
Alexandra

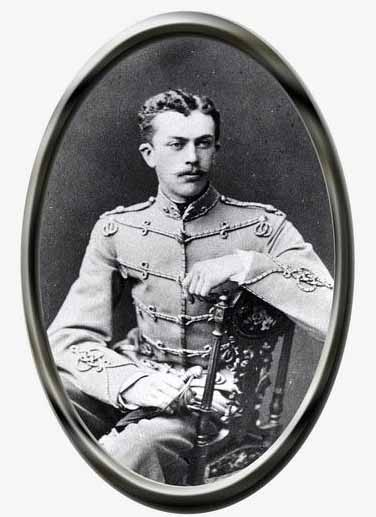
Peter
