= Grigory Rabinovich =

Russian medical doctor and KGB officer

Grigory Rabinovich (born 1892, date of death unknown) was a medical doctor and KGB Officer. He was sent to the United States in the 1930s. His cover was a worker for the Russian Red Cross Society. His mission was to "supervise penetration of the American Trotskyist movement".
