= Yekaterina Sheremeteva =

Countess Yekaterina Pavlovna Sheremeteva
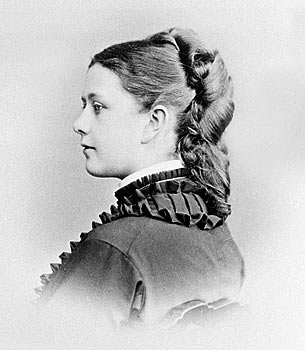
- Born: Princess Yekaterina Pavlovna Vyazemskaya; 20 September 1849; Constantinople, Ottoman Empire
- Died: 24 January 1929 (aged 79); Ostafyevo, Podolsk district, Moscow Governorate, Soviet Union
- Noble family: Vyazemsky
- Spouse: Sergei Dmitrievich Sheremetev
- Issue: Dmitry; Pavel; Boris Sergeevich; Anna; Peter; Sergei; Maria; Ekaterina; Vasili
- Father: Pavel Petrovich Vyazemsky
- Mother: Maria Arkadyevna Stolypina
- Occupation: Maid of honour State Lady

Countess Yekaterina Pavlovna Sheremeteva (Russian: графиня Екатерина Павловна Шереметева, née Princess Vyazemskaya (княжна Вяземская): 2 September 1849 – 24 January 1929) was a maid of honour, state lady, and founder of the natural history museum in Mikhailovskoye, and the Society of Ancient Literature Lovers.

== Early life ==
Princess Yekaterina Pavlovna was born on 20 September 1849, to Prince Pavel Petrovich Vyazemsky and his wife Maria Arkadyevna (née Stolypina). Her father was the son of Pyotr Vyazemsky, who was a close friend of Alexander Pushkin. Having received a good education, her father entered the service of the Ministry of Foreign Affairs where he worked as part of Russia's diplomatic missions. Her mother was the eldest daughter of Decembrist and writer Arkady Alekseevich Stolypin. Throughout her childhood, she was surrounded by personalities such as Nikolay Karamzin, Wilhelm Küchelbecker, Alexander Griboyedov, and Kondraty Ryleyev.

Yekaterina spent her childhood at the imperial court. In 1857, the Vyazemskys returned to Saint Petersburg, and Maria Arkadyevna was made a maid of honour to Empress Maria Alexandrovna. Yekaterina and her sister Alexandra, were friends and classmates of Grand Duchess Maria Alexandrovna. The family spent a lot of time on the Ostafyevo estate.

Having grown up, Yekaterina Pavlovna helped her father in creating the Society of Lovers of Ancient Writing, where she was head of the department of "textbook and individual sheets". She was also fond of drawing.

== Marriage and Children ==
Princess Yekaterina Pavlovna Vyazemskaya married Count Sergei Dmitritevich Sheremetev in the church of Ostankino on 30 June 1868. Sheremetev was the son of Count Dmitri Nikolaevich Sheremetev and Countess Anna Sergeevna née Sheremetva. The marriage would produce nine children:

- Dmitri (1869 - 1943), married Countess Irina Illarionovna Vorontsova-Sashkova (1872 - 1959)
- Pavel (1871 - 1943), married Princess Praskovya Vasilyevna Obolenskaya in 1921
- Boris (1873 - 1946 or 1952), married Baroness Marie-Louise-Margarita von Goebl (1880-1941)
- Anna (1873 - 1943), married Alexander Petrovich Saburov (1870-1919), in 1894
- Peter (1876 - 1914), married Elena Borisovna Meyendorff (1881-1966) in 1900
- Sergei (1878 - 1942)
- Maria (1880 - 1945), married Count Alexander Vasilyevich Gudovich (1869-1919) in 1900
- Yekaterina (born and died 1880)
- Vasili (1882 - 1883)
Portraits of the children by I. K. Makarov, 1880s
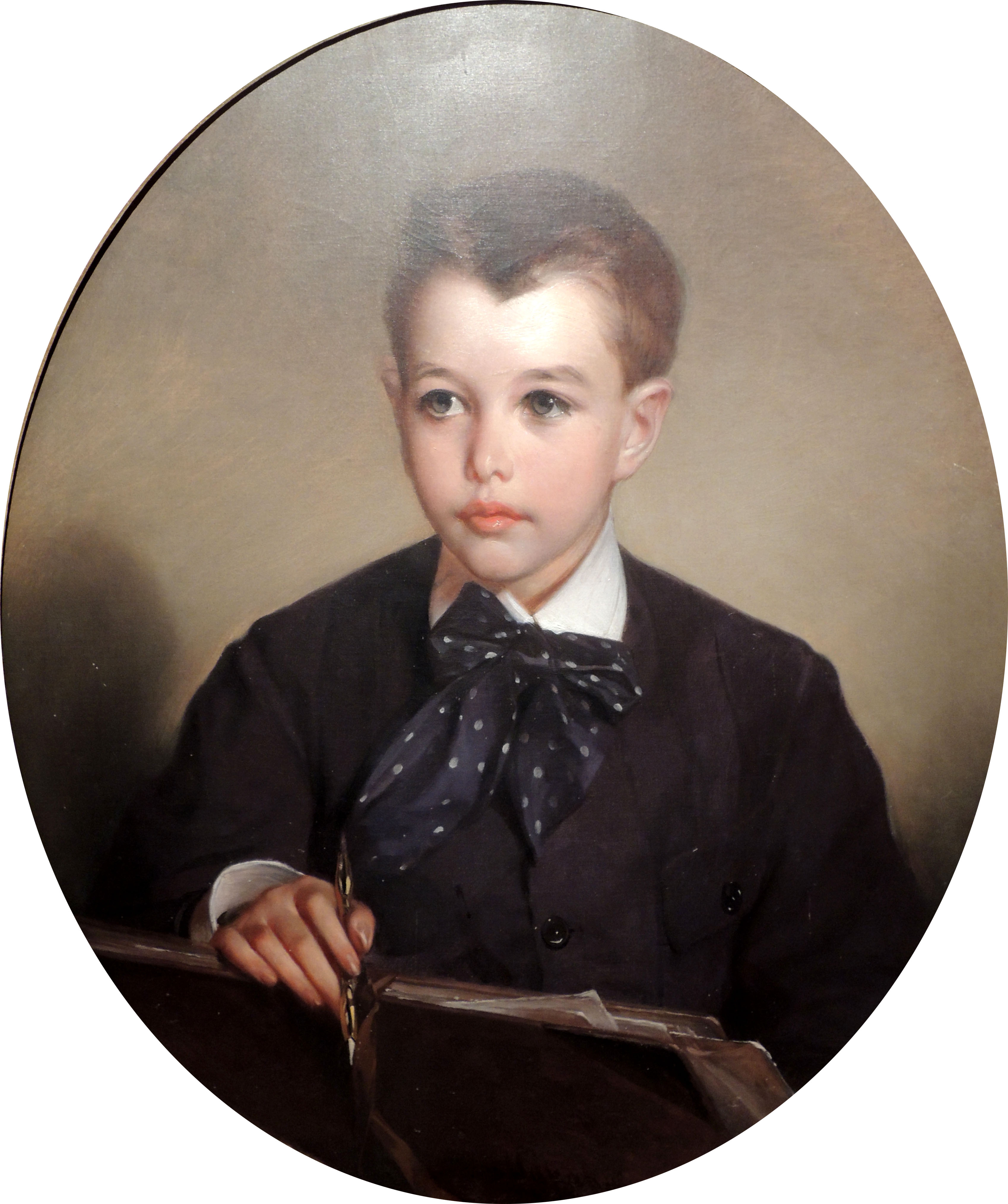
Count Pavel Sheremetev

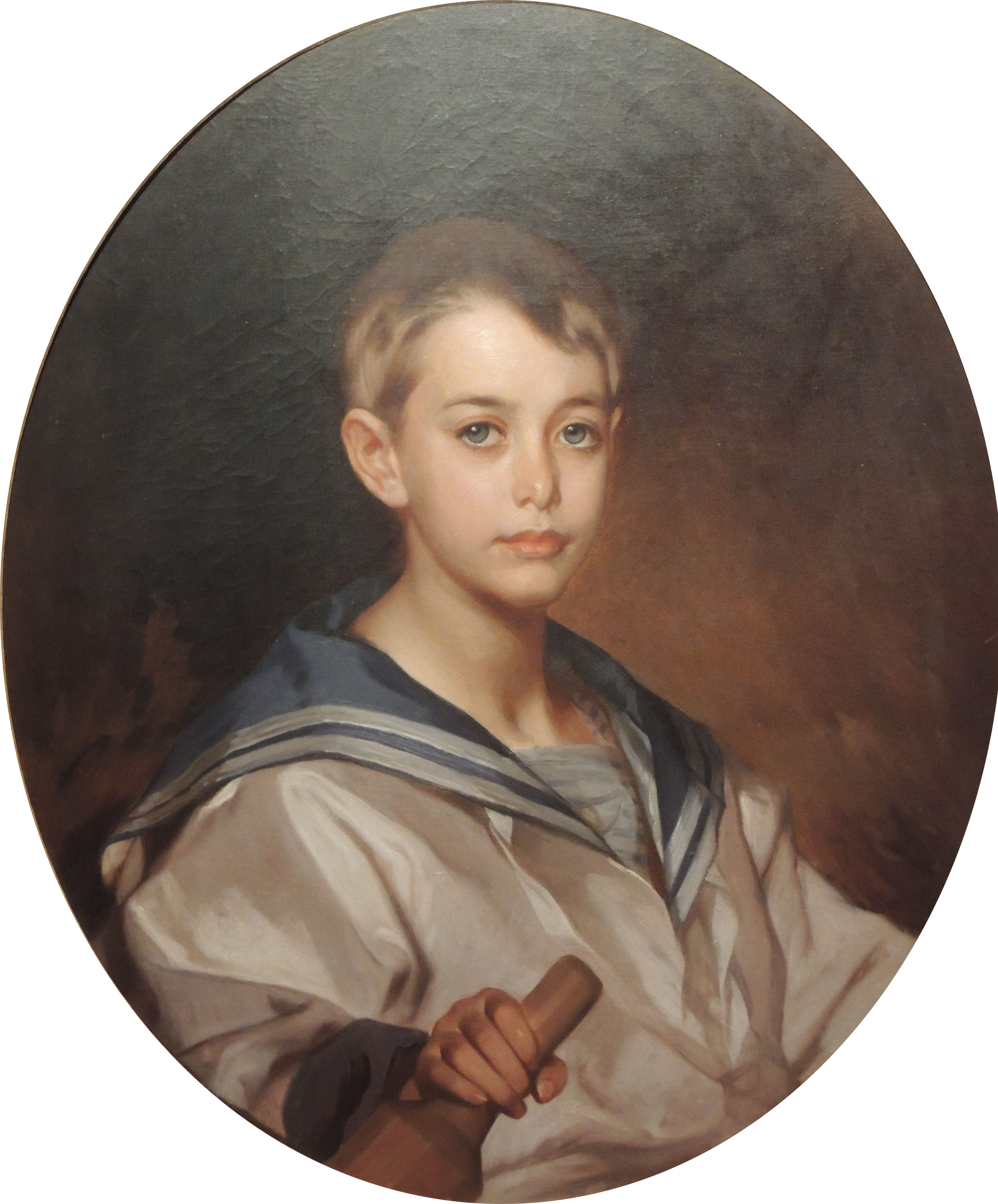
Count Boris Sheremetev

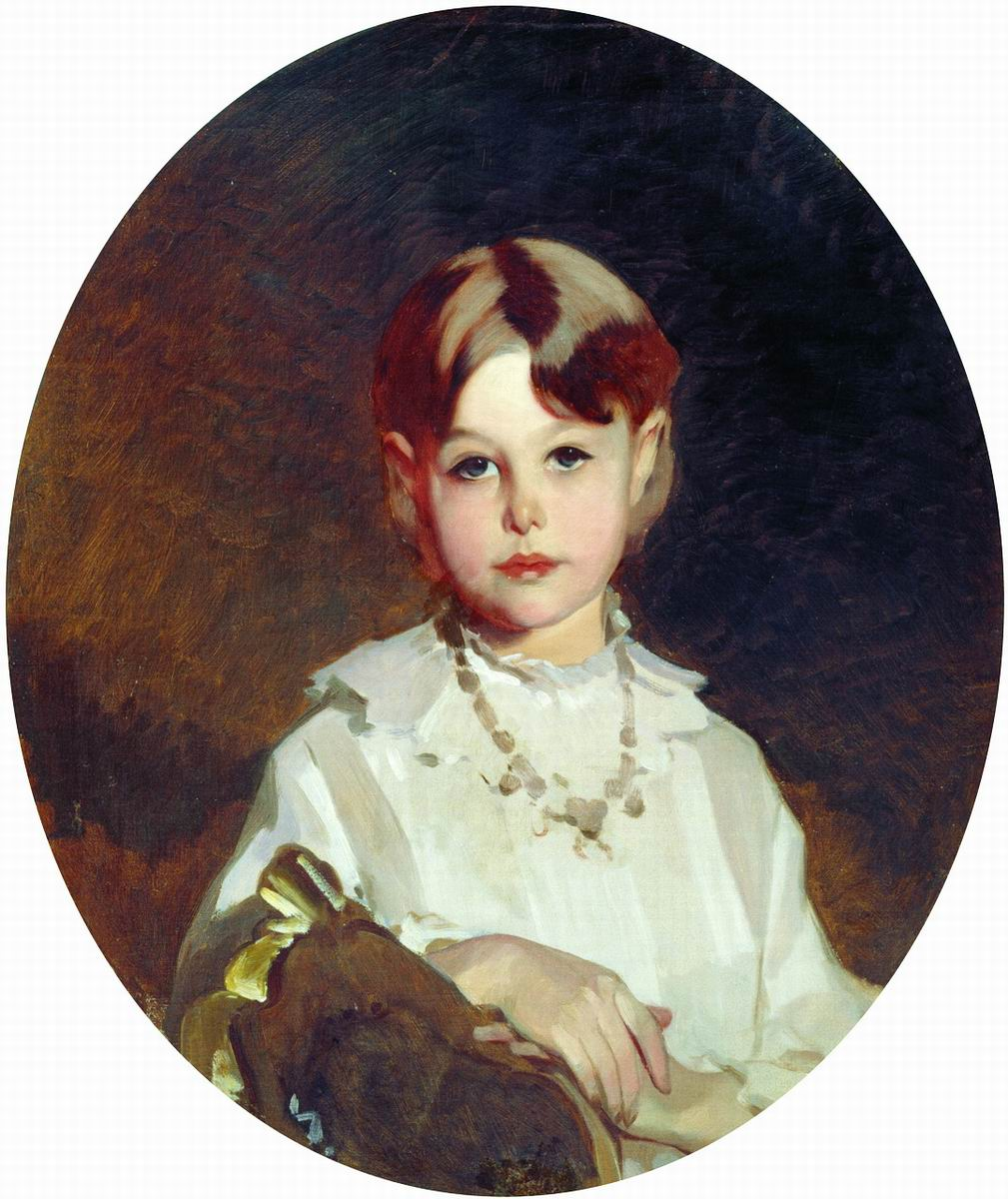
Countess Anna Sheremeteva

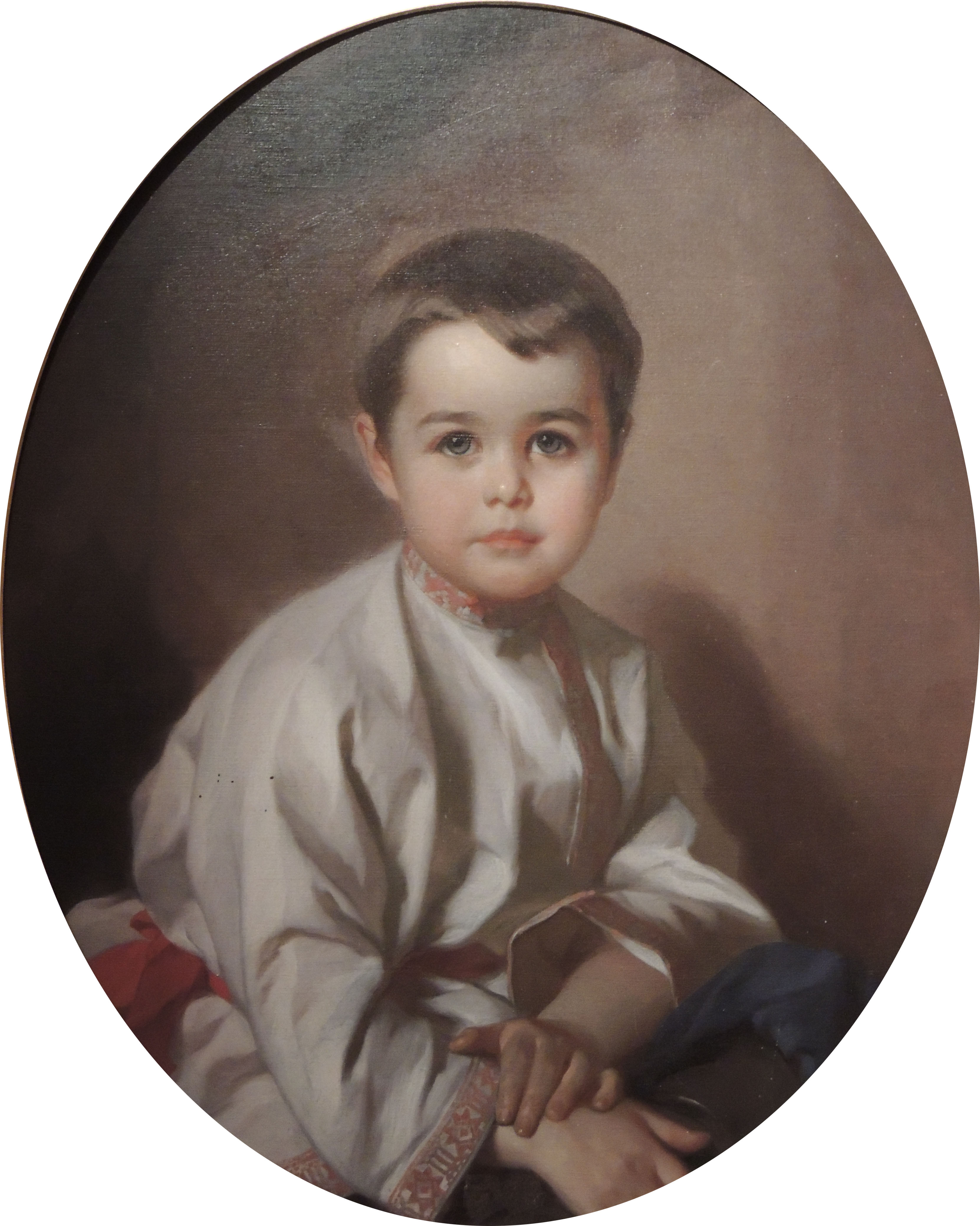
Count Peter Sheremetev

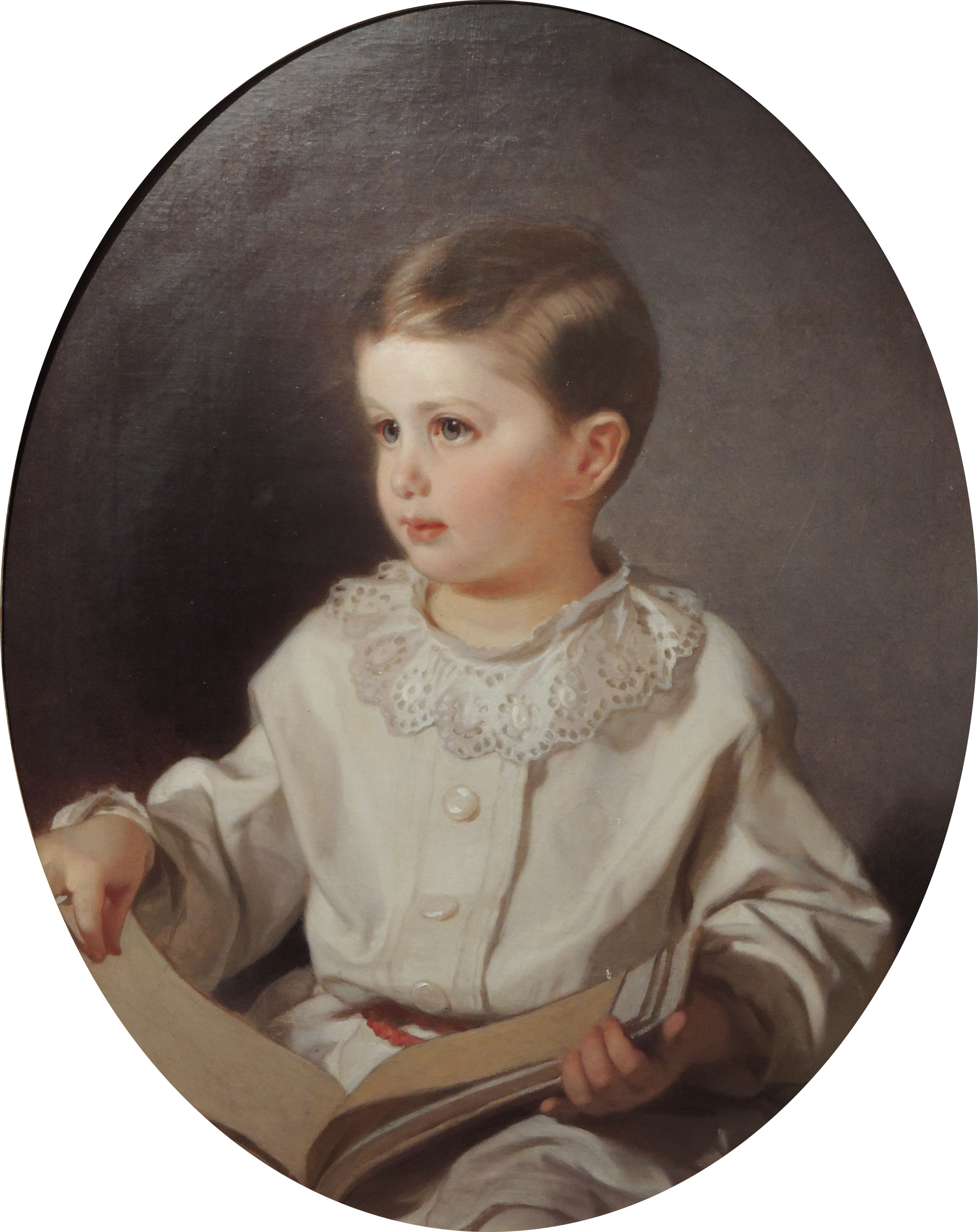
Count Sergei Sheremetev

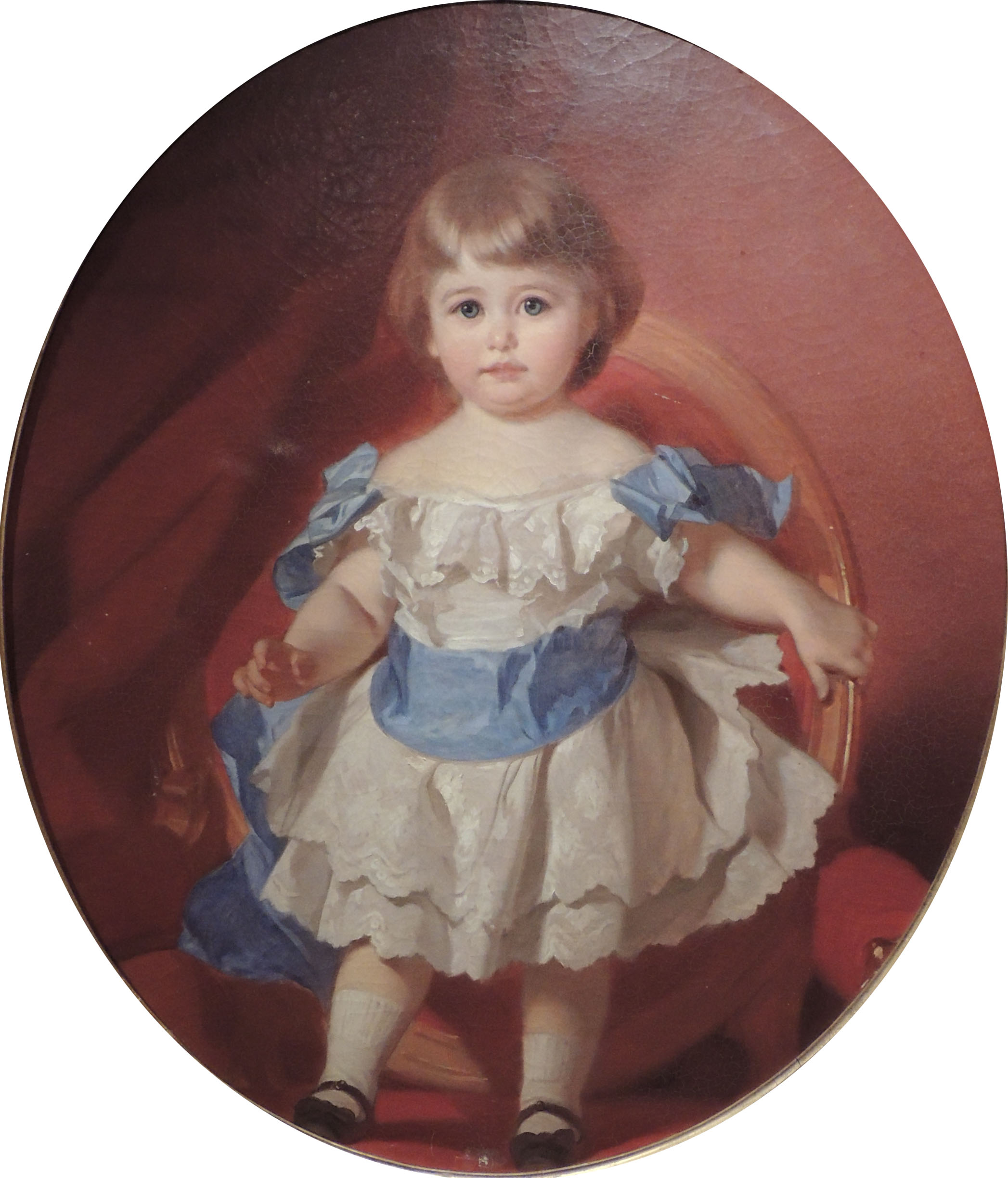
Countess Maria Sheremeteva

== Social Activities ==
In 1895, on the Mikhailovsky estate near Moscow, Yekaterina created a natural history museum. Fedor Vladimirovich Buchholz noted:

"Natural history collections stored in the village Mikhailovsky, Podolsk district, Moscow province, collected by countess Yekaterina Pavlovna Sheremeteva with the aim of creating a small local museum. They will be supplemented over time and may thus be of some benefit in the study of our domestic flora and fauna... the idea of Countess Ekaterina Pavlovna to organize this kind of museum can be considered very successful, and it would only be desirable that there were more nature lovers in Russia who were ready in the same way to bring their share of benefits to the knowledge of the nature of their fatherland."

Next to the museum was the Mikhailovsky Botanical Garden, which consisted of gardens where living material was collected during the summer. The museum also had a library filled with books on natural history in both Russian and English. In 1921, part of the agricultural library formed the basis of the library of the Moscow Regional Museum. Yekaterina PAvlovna corresponded with many contemporary scientists, including professors from universities in Moscow, Saint Petersburg, and Kharkov, and members of government organisations in Kiev, Tula, Minsk, Crimea, and Odessa.

Continuing her mother's work, Yekaterina Pavlovna was involved with charities. She funded a library in the Hospice House in Moscow and organised the work of the Russian Red Cross Society during the Russo-Japanese War, and was a member of the Orthodox Missionary Society and of the Animal Acclimatisation Society, honorary chaiman of the Society for the Development of Handicrafts in the Podolsk district, trustee of an almshouse in Kuskovo, and of nunneries and parochial schools in Pleskovo and Mikhailovskoye. She also funded several expeditions and publications.

In 1898, Yekaterina Pavlovna and her husband bought the Ostafyevo estate from her brother Pyotr Pavlovich Vyazemsky (1754 - 1931) where they established a museum for Pushkin. In 1911 and 1913 they erected monuments in the estate park to Karamzin, Vyazemsky, Pushkin, and Zhukovsky.

== Later life ==
Memoirist Tatyana Alexandrovna Aksova-Sievers met the Countess in 1904 and described her as such:

"Countess Yekaterina Pavlovna was over fifty years old at that time, and she already dressed 'like an old woman'. I always saw her in a suit of English cut, the colour of which changed depending on the occasion. Her impeccably beautiful features, tall, dense, somewhat stooped figure and calm manner without any affection gave the impression of nobility and simplicity. From conversations with Sukhareva, it was possible to understand that Yekaterina Pavlovna's role in the family was passive and that her will in most cases was suppressed by the stormy and despotic temper of her husband."

The post-revolutionary years became the most difficult in the life of Countess Sheremetva both of her sons-in-law were arrested in 1919 and soon shot. Many other relatives and family friends were also arrested. In December 1918 her husband died, afterwards, Yekaterina was forced to live with the family of her son Pavel, who was appointed head of the Ostafyevo museum and estate.

Countess Yekaterina Pavlovna Sheremeteva died on 24 January 1929 and was buried near the walls of the Holy Trinity Church in Ostafyevo.
