= Nikolay Parijskij =

Nikolay Vasilievich Parijskij
- Born: Nikolay Vasilievich Parijskij; Николай Васильевич Парийский; 17 May 1858; Tver Governorate
- Died: 20 July 1923 (aged 65)
- Occupation: surgeon

Nikolay Vasilievich Parijskij (Russian: Николай Васильевич Парийский; 17 May 1858 — 20 July 1923) was a Russian Empire surgeon and orthopedist. Professor, Doctor of Medicine, Active State Councillor.

== Biography ==
Nikolay Vasilievich Parijskij was born in the family of a priest on 17 May 1858 (5 May in Old Style). In 1882 he graduated with honors from the Imperial Military Medical Academy and later served as a junior surgeon in the 51st Lithuanian Regiment in the Crimea, and then in Simferopol Infirmary.

In 1889, he was seconded to the Military Medical Academy, where he defended his thesis on psammotherapy. He worked there as a doctor, assistant, senior assistant, and was in charge of the Orthopedic Department.

He worked as the head of the surgical department and the chief doctor of Tiflis Railway Hospital. In 1899, he was appointed head of Rostov-on-Don City Hospital (Nikolaev City Hospital). In 1915 he took an active part in the organization of Rostov University, where he was elected professor of the Medical Faculty.

He died of malaria on 20 July 1923.

Nikolay Parijskij was awarded the medal the Russian Red Cross Society in memory of the participation of the society in the Russo-Japanese War (1904—1905), and a medal for active participation in the fight against cholera and plague epidemics.

Parijskij was the author of 72 scientific works. He mainly studied contractures of joints, congenital dislocations and spodiloarthritis. One of his main works is the monograph "Biomechanics as the basis of the theory of curvatures of the human body", published in 1923.

In 2012 at a sanatorium of the Ministry of Defense of Ukraine in Evpatoria was installed a memorial plaque dedicated to Nikolay Parijskij.
