= Senate Square (Saint Petersburg) =

Square in Saint Petersburg, Russia

Coordinates: 59.936°N 30.303°E

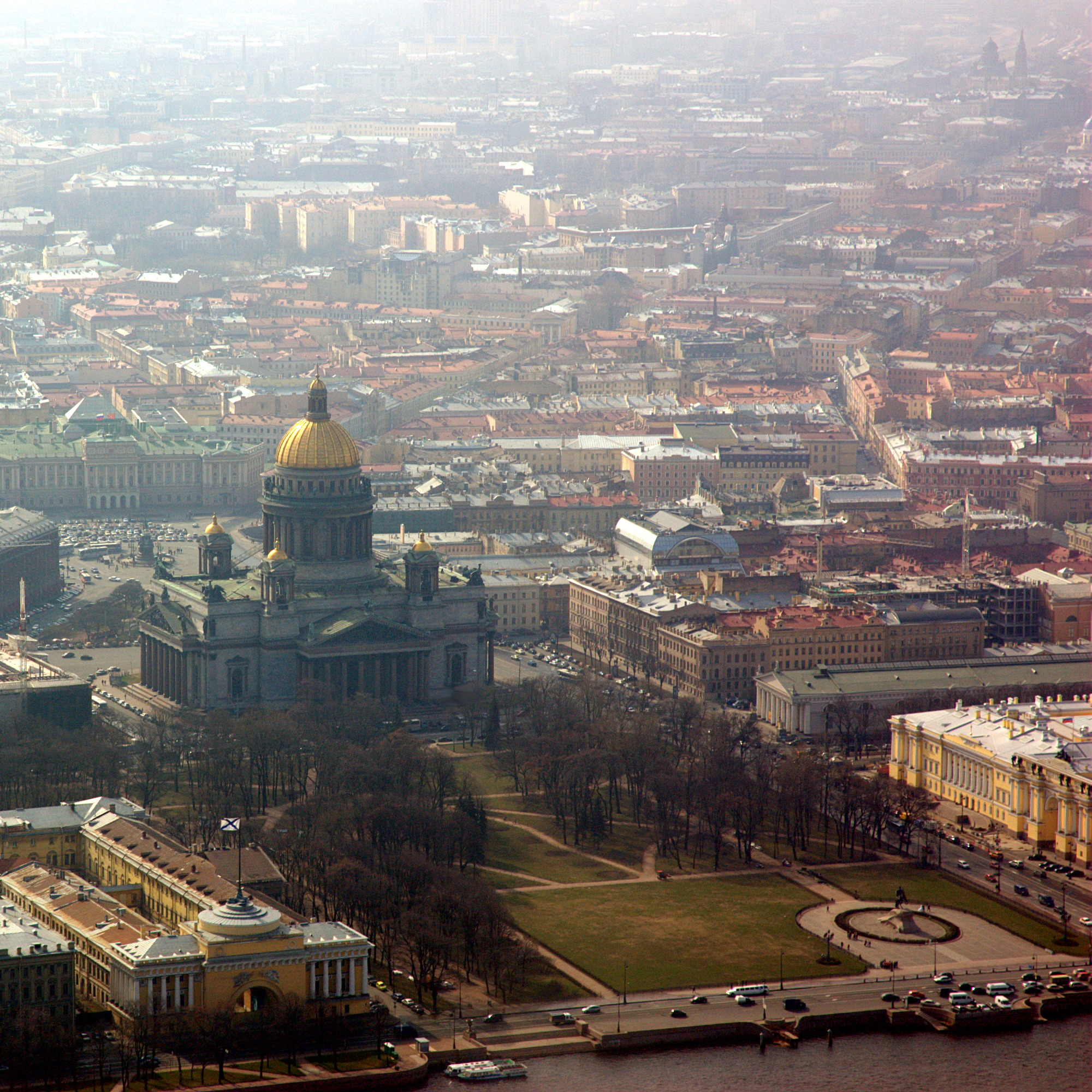
St. Isaac's Cathedral and Senate Square

Senate Square (Russian: Сенатская площадь), formerly known as Decembrists' Square (Площадь Декабристов) from 1925 to 2008, and (formally) as Peter's Square (Петровская площадь), from 1782 to 1925, is a city square in Saint Petersburg, Russia. It is situated on the left bank of the Bolshaya Neva, in front of Saint Isaac's Cathedral. In 1925 it was renamed Decembrists' Square to commemorate the Decembrist Revolt, which took place there in December 1825.

The square is bounded by the Admiralty building to the east. On the west is the Senate Building (Note: "Senate" in this context refers to the Governing Senate of the Russian Empire, which moved to "Senate Square" during the reign of Catherine the Great. In contrast, the upper house or "senate" in the present-day Russian Federation, known as the Federation Council (Russian: Сове́т Федера́ции) or Sovfed (Russian: Совфед), convenes in Moscow. The lower house in Russia, known as the Duma or Gosduma (Russian: Госду́ма), has its building in Tverskoy District in Moscow, along the north side of Manezhnaya or Manage Square (Russian: Манежная площадь) which has the Manage building (Russian: Мане́ж) along its west side.) and the Senate and Synod Building (now headquarters of the Constitutional Court of Russia and Boris Yeltsin Presidential Library). The Bronze Horseman monument, a statue honoring Peter the Great, has stood in the square since 1782 - whence the official name of "Peter's Square". On July 29, 2008, the square reverted to the name "Senate Square".

== See also ==
- List of squares in Saint Petersburg
