= Senate and Synod Building =

Headquarters of the Russian Constitutional Court and Boris Yeltsin Presidential Library

Coordinates: 59°56′09″N 30°18′02″E

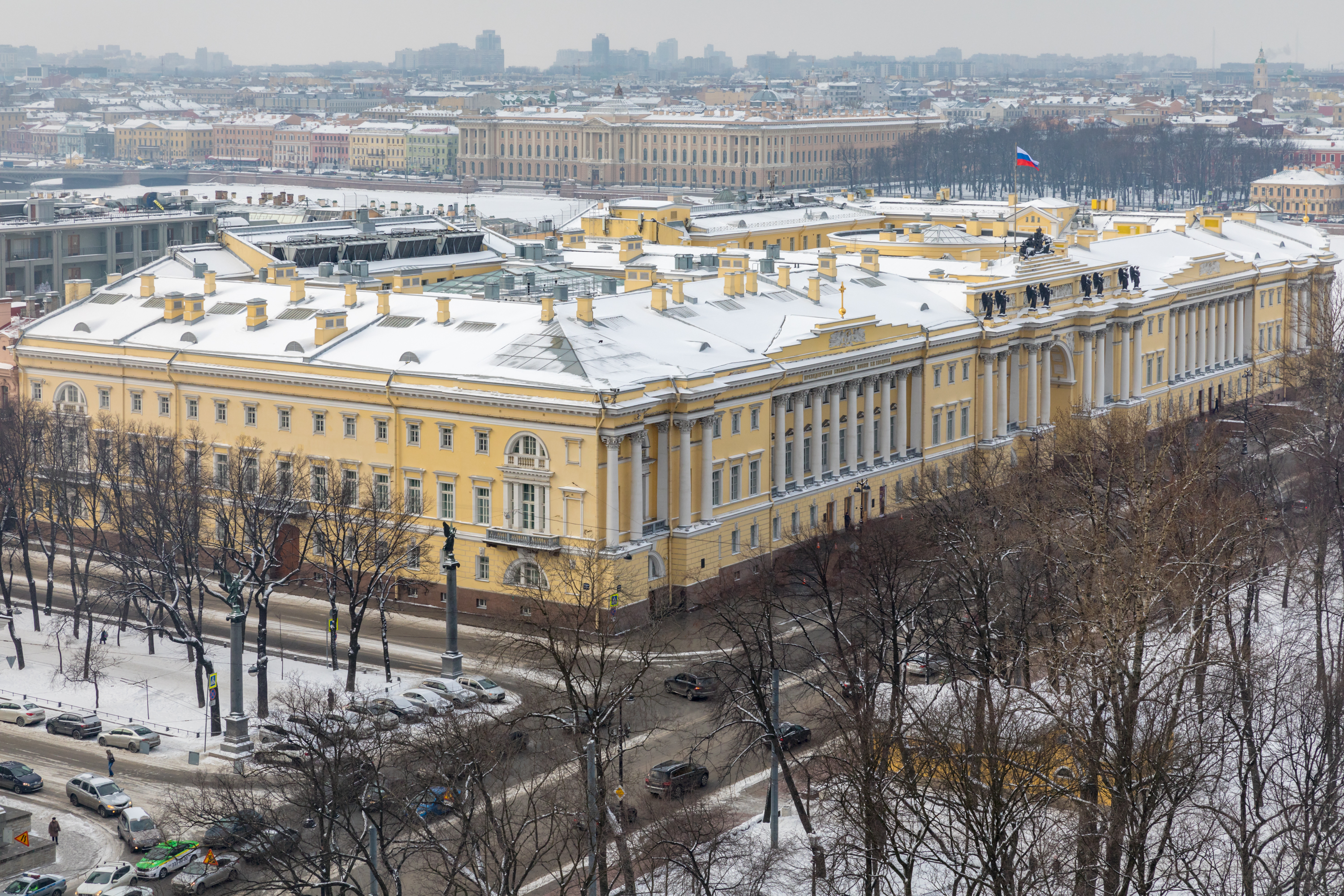
The Senate and Synod Building from Saint Isaac's Cathedral dome

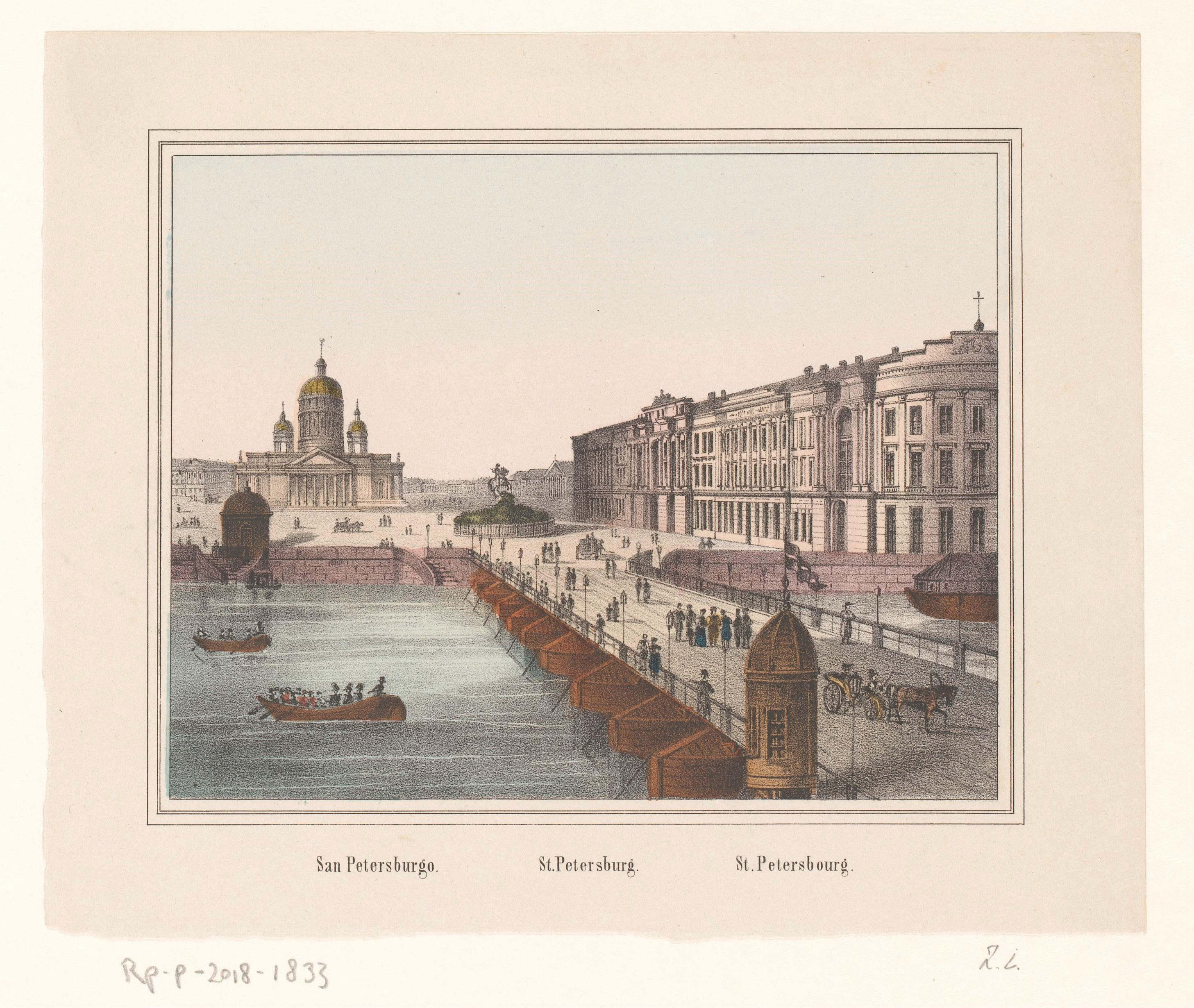
The Senate and Synod Building and Saint Isaac's Cathedral on a 1856 Dutch wood engraving

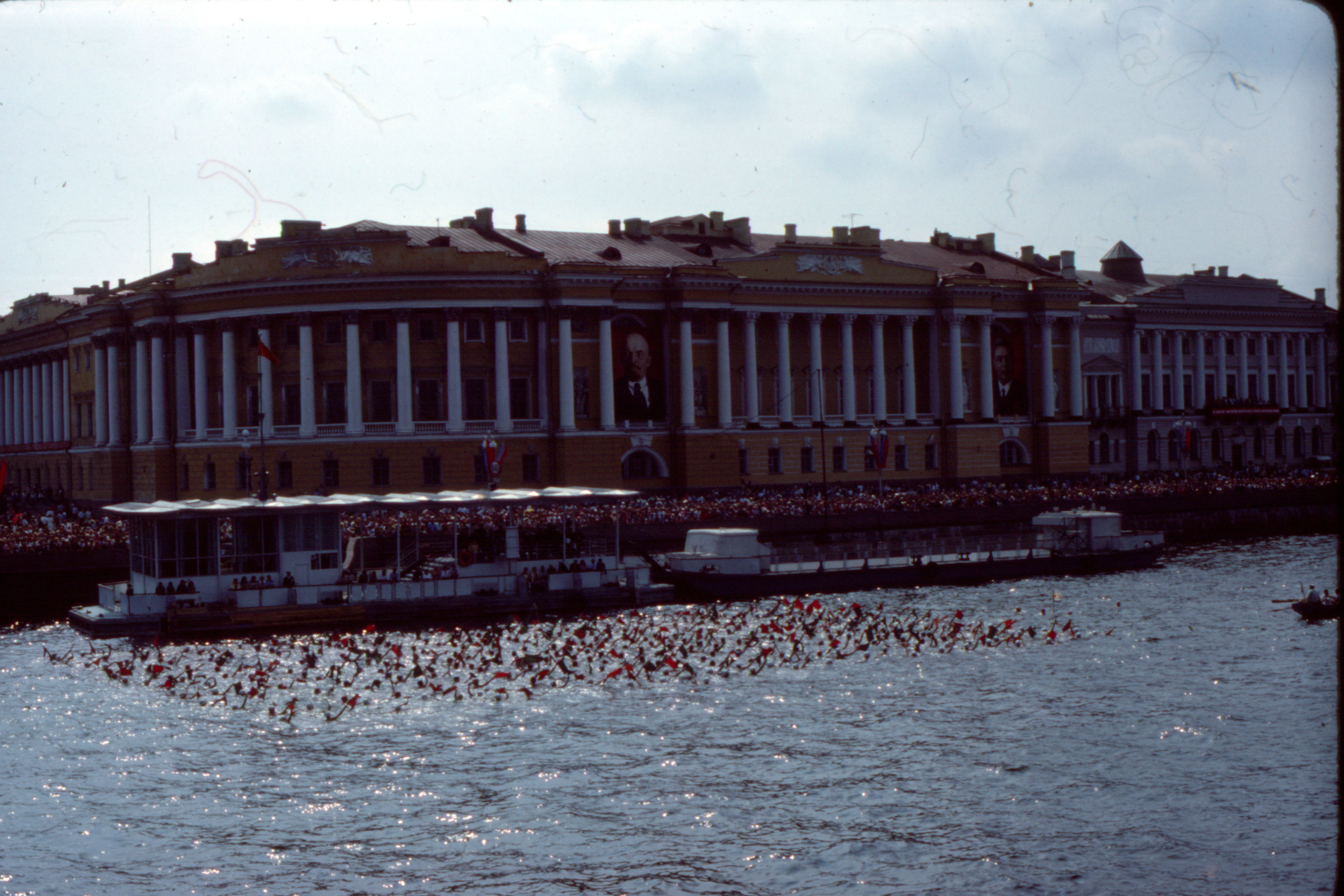
The Senate and Synod Building, 1974

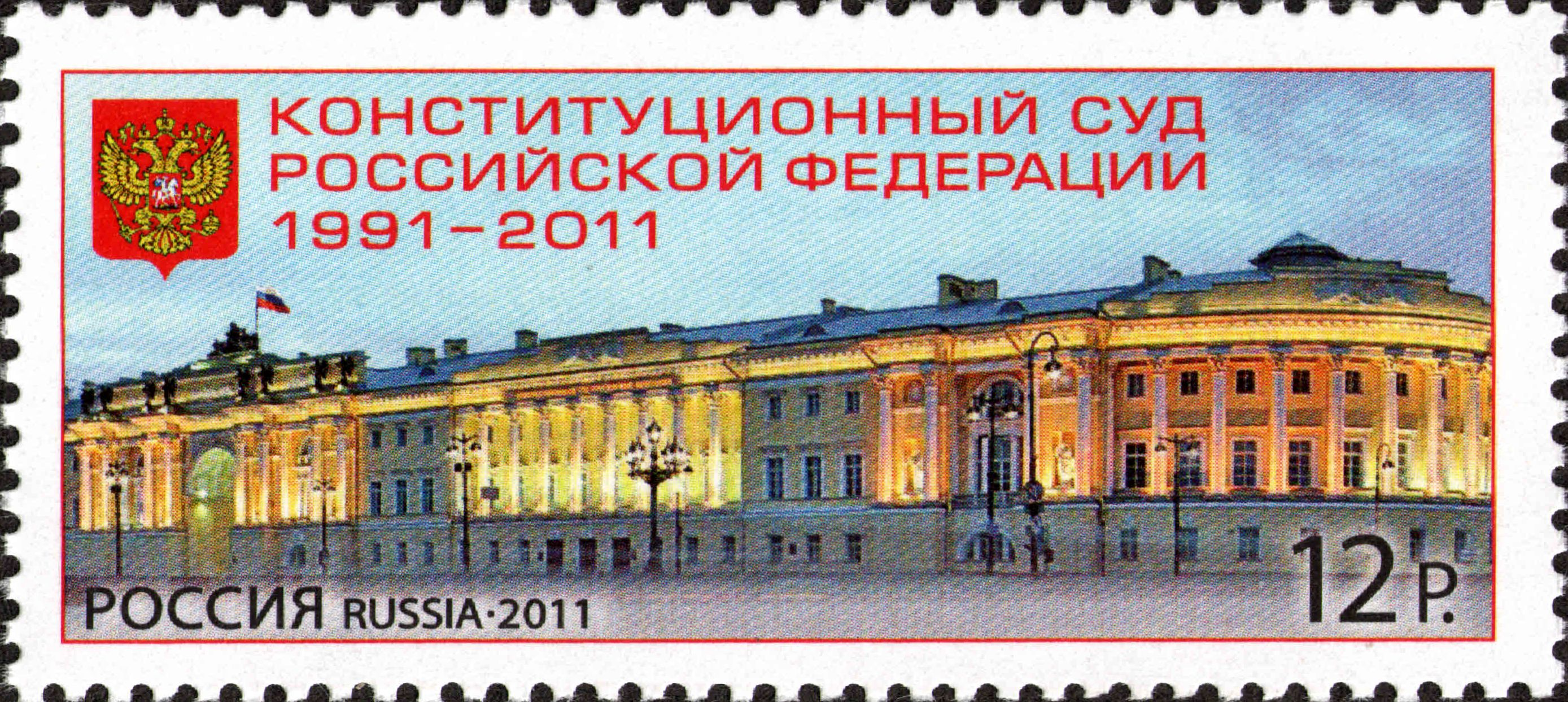
The building on a 2011 Russian post stamp

The Senate and Synod Building is the former headquarters of the Governing Senate and the Most Holy Synod of the Russian Empire in the Senate Square, Central St. Petersburg, Russia and the current headquarters of the Russian Constitutional Court and Boris Yeltsin Presidential Library.

== History ==
Both the Senate and Synod originally occupied the building of the Twelve Collegia.

The first building on the current site of these institutions was the half-timbered house of Prince Alexander Menshikov, who fell from grace and saw his house on the Neva Embankment (on the portion now known as the English Embankment) become the property of Vice-Chancellor Andrey Osterman. In 1744, Empress Elizabeth granted the house to Chancellor Alexey Bestuzhev-Ryumin, who had a Baroque building erected for himself.

After the accession of Catherine the Great, Bestuzhev-Ryumin's house passed to the treasury and the Senate took up residence there, having been rebuilt by architect Alexander Vista. During the 1780s and 1790s, Bestuzhev's Baroque house was rebuilt once again, with its facades receiving a new, classicist architectural treatment. The name of the architect who designed the building reconstruction project is unknown. Based on the drawing of the western façade of the building, which is preserved in the collection of the Museum of the Russian Academy of Arts, it is believed that the project was created by architect Ivan Starov.

In 1806–1823, with the construction of the Admiralty Building, the previous buildings on Senate Square no longer matched the new appearance. There was a need for reconstruction and a competition was held for the design of new buildings for the Senate and Synod. On 24 August 1829, construction of the Senate building began, and in 1830, that of the Synod buildings. Construction was completed in 1834 under the supervision of architect Alexander Staubert and designed by Carlo Rossi.

From 1925 to 2006, the building was used as headquarters of the Russian State Historical Archive.

In December 2005, the Legislative Assembly of St. Petersburg proposed using the Senate and Synod building for a highest court headquarters or a museum. This idea was initially proposed by then-speaker of the Federation Council, Sergey Mironov, in October of that year. On March 22, 2006, the State Duma adopted a law in the first reading to transfer the Constitutional Court from Moscow to St. Petersburg.

On 27 May 2008, the first session of the Constitutional Court took place in the Senate and Synod building.

In May 2008, a project to reconstruct the former Synod building was unveiled to house the Boris Yeltsin Presidential Library. As part of the project, the library provided for the possible placement of patriarchal chambers and apartments for the President of Russia, with separate entrances leading to the recreated general presence hall for meetings between secular and religious authorities. The library was opened on 27 May 2009, and since then the building has housed the Patriarch's office, as well as a representative area for the Russian president, including an office and a reception room. On the same day, Patriarch Kirill performed a minor consecration ceremony for the restored house church of the Seven Ecumenical Councils and presided over a session of the Holy Synod of the Russian Orthodox Church for the first time since it had been held in the Synod building during the synodal era.

== Interior ==
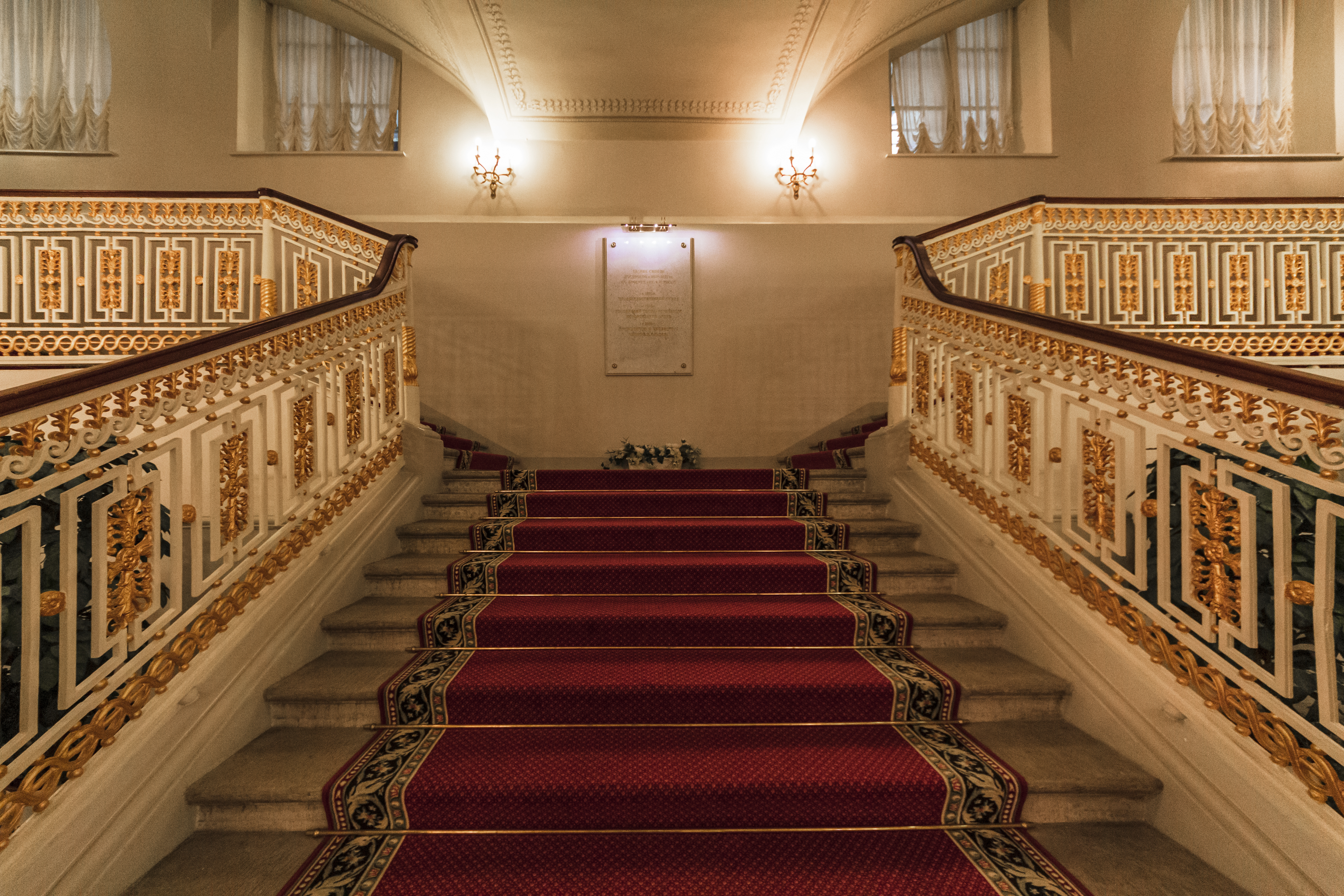
The Grand Staircase

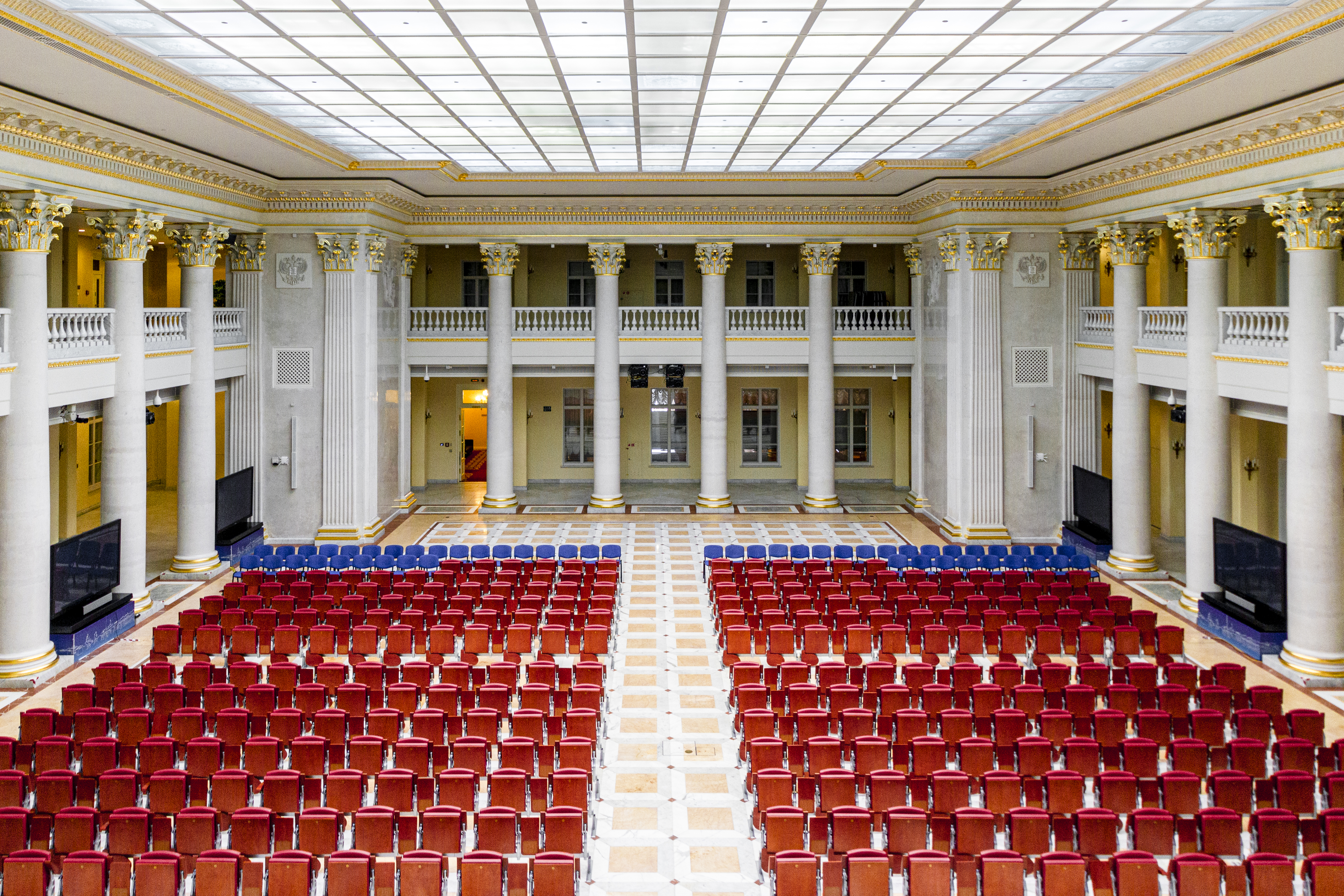
The Great Conference Room

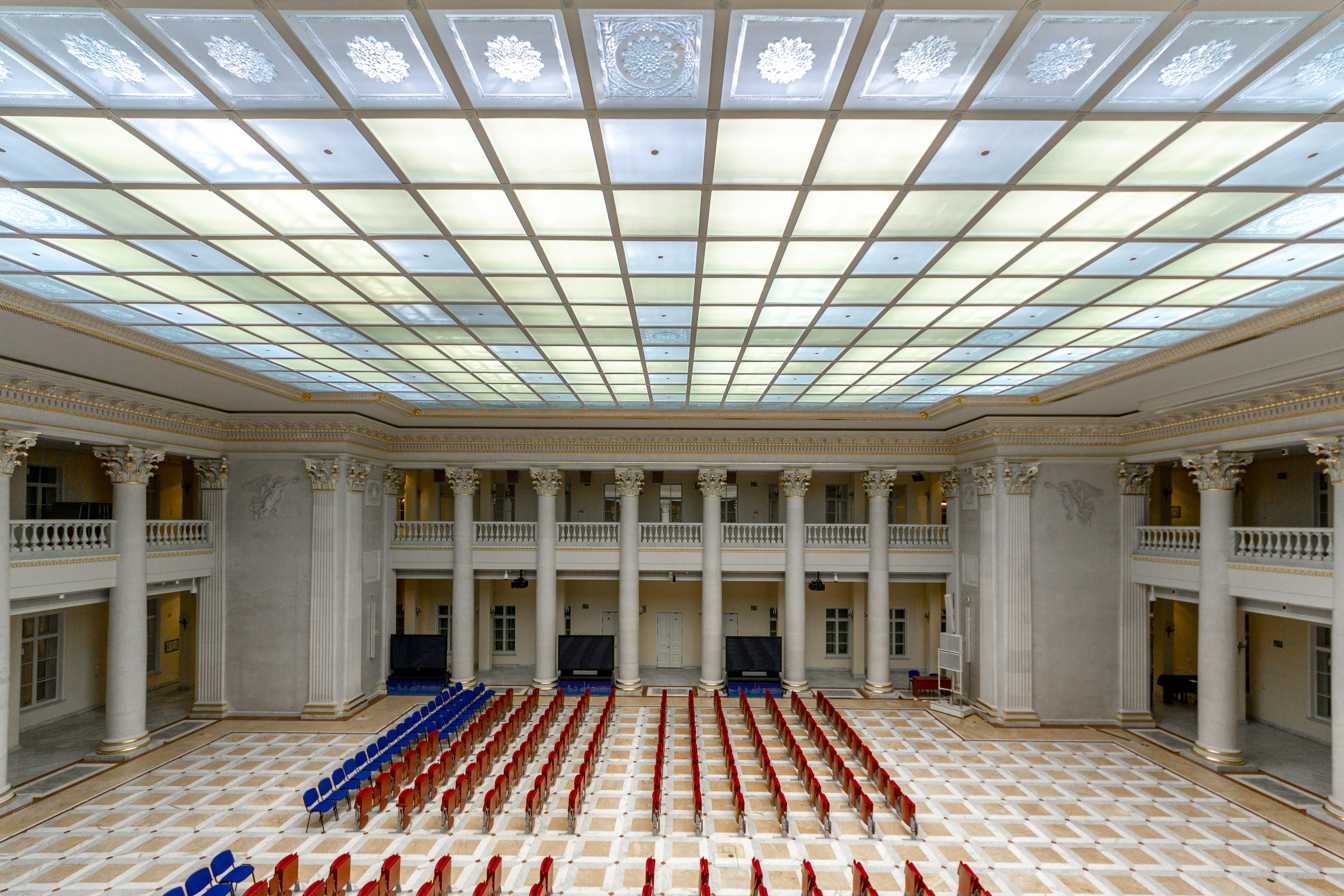
The Conference Room

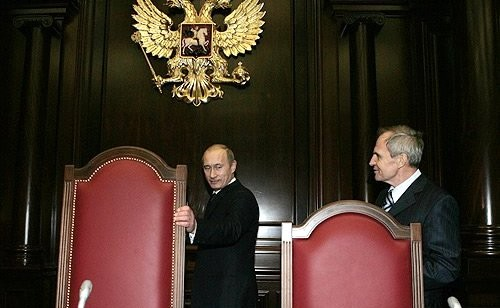
The Courtroom

== See also ==
- The Senate Palace (Moscow)
