= Pyatigorsk Colony of the Russian Red Cross Society =

- Пятиго́рская коло́ния Росси́йского о́бщества Кра́сного Креста́
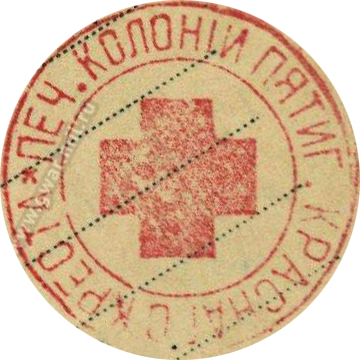

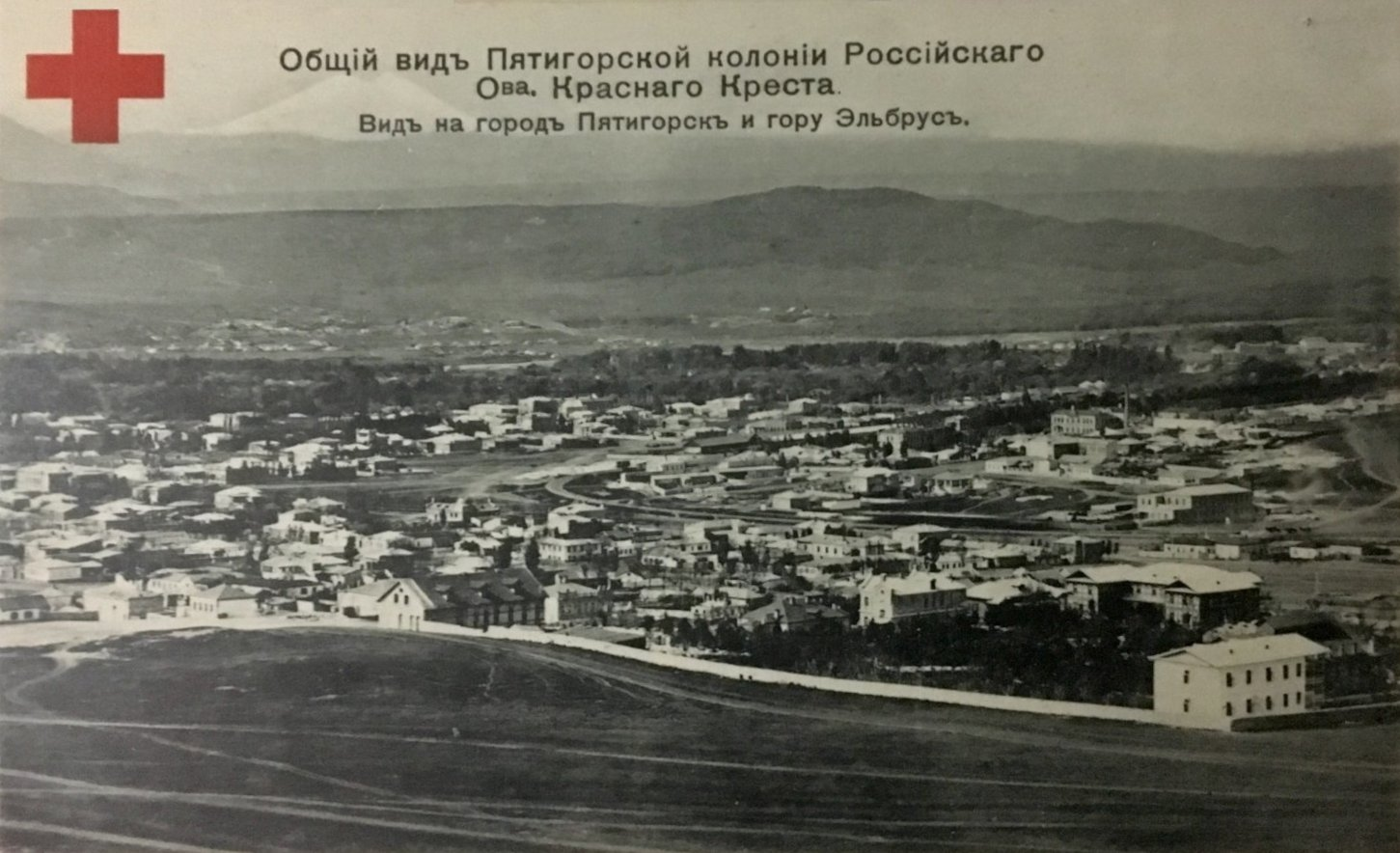
- View of Pyatigorsk Red Cross Colony
- Formation: 1901
- Dissolved: 1917
- Type: medical organization
- Legal status: charity
- Purpose: humanitarian
- Location: Pyatigorsk, Russian Empire
- Official language: Russian
- Parent organization: Russian Red Cross Society

Pyatigorsk Colony of the Russian Red Cross Society (Russian: Пятиго́рская коло́ния Росси́йского о́бщества Кра́сного Креста́) was a medical organization that acted from 1901 to 1917 in Pyatigorsk. It was a local department of the Russian Red Cross Society which came to Pyatigorsk in 1879. Historical buildings of the Colony were being built in the 1890s and early 1900s. Medical organization started work in May 1901. Both hospital and ambulatory treatment of different illnesses and injuries were carried out in Pyatigorsk Red Cross Colony. In the first years, most of the patients were soldiers, officers and visitant campers. And a small part of the hospital seats was reserved for residents, students, teachers and other poor patients. The Colony was funded by the central administrative board of the Russian Red Cross Society, local authorities and private benefactors.

In the early 20th century, the Colony had extended its activities and established affiliated colonies in Georgiyevsk, Yessentuki, Zheleznovodsk and Kislovodsk.

Pyatigorsk Alexandra and George Nurses Community (Russian: Пятиго́рская Алекса́ндро-Гео́ргиевская Общи́на сестёр милосе́рдия) acted in the Colony territory. This community had been established in 1894 and then it became the largest charity organization in Pyatigorsk, which not only treated patients but also teach nursing to women. During World War I, the nurses community had established 4-month courses on military nursing and the lazaretto network.

During the years of World War I and the Russian Civil War, Pyatigorsk Colony and other colonies at the Caucasian Mineral Waters became military hospitals for the wounded. After October Revolution, Pyatigorsk Red Cross Colony continued its medical activities as a people hospital and sanatorium. Pyatigorsk City Clinical Hospital now worked at the territory and several extant buildings of the Colony.

The architectural ensemble and several historical buildings of Pyatigorsk Colony of the Russian Red Cross Society are recognized as landmark buildings and cultural heritage sites under state protection.

== Background ==
In the latter half of the 19th century, the Caucasian Mineral Waters (CMW) region was already a well-known health resort, but there was no healthcare system established by the state or the big private organization. The tsarist government leased resorts to private entrepreneurs and hadn't cared for resort development and construction of healthcare facilities.

Rich campers often came to CMW with their doctors, and these doctors rendered paid medical aid to other patients. But the term of full recovery could be unpredictable, and some visitants had not enough money for accommodation, food and medical services. Sometimes seriously ill visitants were left without any means of subsistence.

For these people, Saint Olga Shelter (Russian: Приют Святой Ольги) at Nizhegorodskaya Street of Pyatigorsk had been built in 1872. It was a 10-beds charity seasonal hospital that worked from May 1 to October 10. The hospital building was projected by Samuel Upton, an architect. Resort leaseholder Anderey Matveevich Baikov and CMW Resort Agency chief medical officer Matvey Karlovich Milutin gave had given a money support for it.

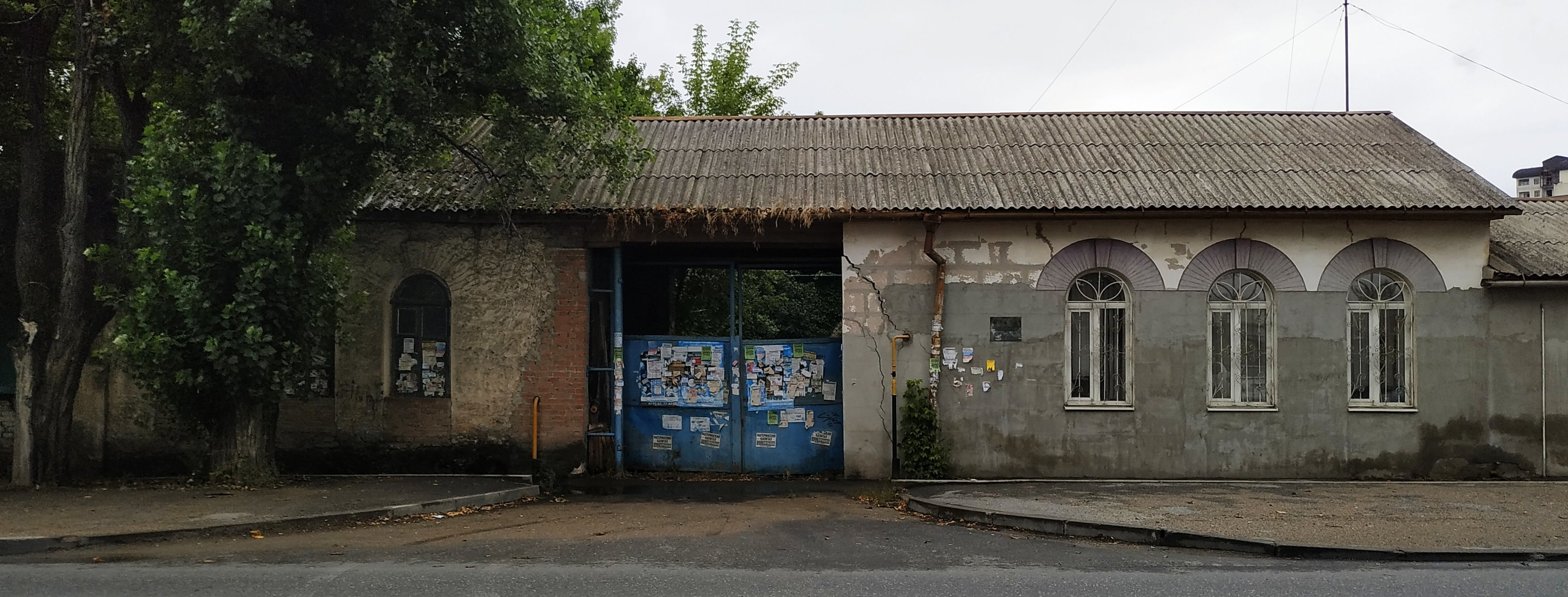
Building of Saint Olga Shelter in 2021

Most of the patients were philistine, retired officers, teachers and other poor people. They had free accommodation, food and treatment there, drank mineral water and took baths with it. This hospital was a clinical trial base for physicians. It allowed research on the impact of mineral waters on human health through long medical observations impossible in out-patient treatment. That experience showed great benefits of Saint Olga Shelter hospital, both for the patients and science. And shelter organizer sent to local authorities a request for shelter enlargement. Year after opening, Saint Olga Shelter received funding from the town's budget and became a permanent hospital with 30 beds in summers and up to 20 beds in winters. Building of shelter's hospital at 78 Dzerzhinskogo Street (Note: Russian: улица Дзержинского, former Nizhegorodskaya Street Russian: Нижегородская улица.) preserved. In 1995, it had been recognized as a cultural heritage site and regional architectural monument.

== Sources ==
- Гладикова Т. В. (ed.). "Справка о результатах рабочей группы управления Ставропольского края по сохранению и государственной охране объектов культурного наследия по изучению положения дел и оказанию практической помощи органам местного самоуправления муниципального образования города-курорта Пятигорска Ставропольского края в решении вопросов местного значения, направленных на социально-экономическое развитие данного муниципального образования, и осуществлению контроля за исполнением переданных органам местного самоуправления муниципального образования города-курорта Пятигорска Ставропольского края отдельных государственных полномочий Ставропольского края за 2013–2015 годы" (PDF). oknskn.ru (in Russian). Управление Ставропольского края по сохранению и государственной охране объектов культурного наследия. Archived from the original (PDF) on 2021-08-03.
- "История становления и развития больницы". cgbp.ru (in Russian). ГБУЗ СК «Городская клиническая больница» города Пятигорска. Archived from the original on 2020-08-12.
- Марченко, П. П. [in Russian] (1995-11-01). "Постановление Главы Администрации Ставропольского края «О дополнении Списка памятников истории и культуры Ставропольского края, подлежащих государственной охране как памятников местного и республиканского значения, утвержденного решением крайисполкома от 01.10.81 №702» №600 от 01.11.1995". okn-mk.mkrf.ru (in Russian). Министерство культуры Российской Федерации. Archived from the original (pdf) on 2021-07-31.
- Розенберг, С. С. "Ансамбль колонии "КРАСНОГО КРЕСТА". Историческая справка, предоставленная главным специалистом управления культуры администрации города Пятигорска". cgbp.ru (in Russian). ГБУЗ СК «Городская клиническая больница» города Пятигорска. Archived from the original on 2020-08-12.
