= Palace Square =

Central city square of St Petersburg, Russia

Coordinates: 59°56′21″N 30°18′57″E

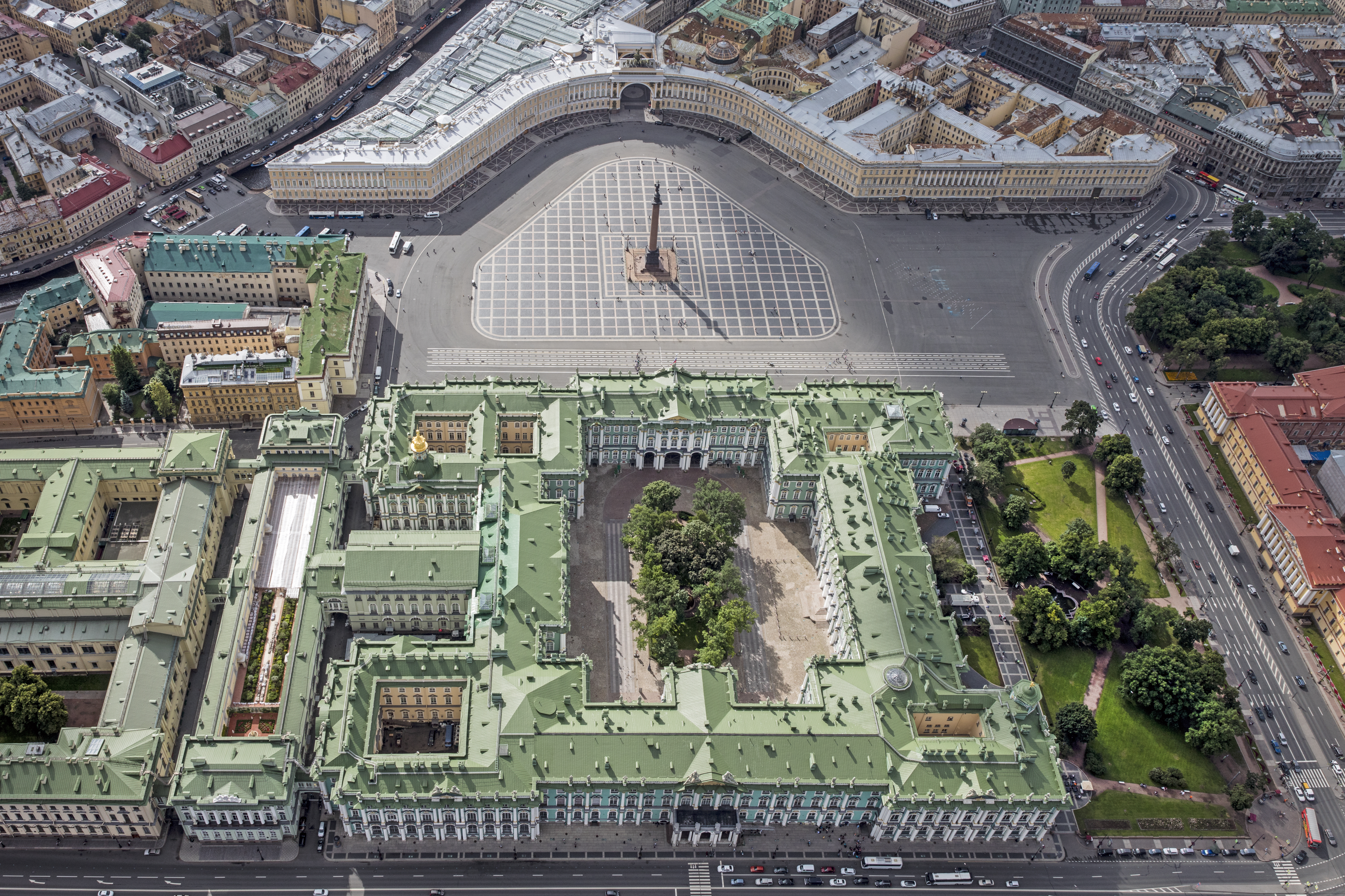
Aerial view of the Palace Square, between the Winter Palace (bottom) and the Building of the General Staff (top).

Palace Square (Russian: Дворцо́вая пло́щадь, romanized: Dvortsovaya Ploshchad, IPA: [dvɐrˈtsovəjə ˈploɕːɪtʲ]), connecting Nevsky Prospekt with Palace Bridge leading to Vasilievsky Island, is the central city square of St Petersburg and of the former Russian Empire. Many significant events took place there, including the Bloody Sunday massacre and parts of the October Revolution of 1917. Between 1918 and 1944, it was known as Uritsky Square (Russian: площадь Урицкого), in memory of the assassinated leader of the city's Cheka branch, Moisei Uritsky.

The earliest and most celebrated building on the square, the Baroque white-and-turquoise Winter Palace (as re-built between 1754 and 1762) of the Russian tsars, gives the square its name. Although the adjacent buildings are designed in the Neoclassical style, they perfectly match the palace in their scale, rhythm, and monumentality. The opposite, southern side of the square was designed in the shape of an arc by George von Velten in the late 18th century. These plans came to fruition half a century later, when Alexander I of Russia (reigned 1801–1825) envisaged the square as a vast monument to the 1812–1814 Russian victories over Napoleon and commissioned Carlo Rossi to design the bow-shaped Empire-style Building of the General Staff (1819–1829), which centers on a double triumphal arch crowned with a Roman quadriga.

In the centre of the square stands the Alexander Column (1830–1834), designed by Auguste de Montferrand. This red granite column (the tallest of its kind in the world) is 47.5 metres high and weighs some 500 tons. It is set so well that it requires no attachment to the base.

The eastern side of the square comprises Alexander Brullov's building of the Guards Corps Headquarters (1837–1843). The western side, however, opens towards Admiralty Square, thus making the Palace Square a vital part of the grand suite of St Petersburg squares.

== See also ==
- List of squares in Saint Petersburg

== Sources ==
- V. I. Pilyavsky (Пилявский В. И.) Дворцовая площадь. — Л.; М.: Искусство, 1958 ("Palace Square in Leningrad". Moscow, 1958.)
