= List of squares in Saint Petersburg =

List of squares in Saint Petersburg.

Name	Russian name	Former names
Alexander Nevsky Square	площадь Александра Невского	Alexander Nevsky Lavra Square (Russian: площадь Александро-Невской лавры, 1857-1880s), Alexander Nevsky Square (Russian: Александро-Невская площадь, 1891-1923), Red Square (Russian: Красная площадь, 1891-1923)
Arts Square	площадь Искусств	Mikhailovskaya Square (Russian: Михайловская площадь, 1834-1918), Lassalle Square (Russian: площадь Лассаля, 1923-1952)
Austrian Square	Австрийская площадь	nameless before 1992
Baltic Fleet Square	площадь Балтийского Флота	
Baltic Rail Terminal Square	площадь Балтийского вокзала	
Baltic Cadets Square	площадь Балтийских Юнг	nameless before 1989
Senate Square	Сенатская площадь	
Europe Square	площадь Европы	nameless before 2003
Exchange Square	Биржевая площадь	
Field of Mars	Марсово поле	Big Meadow (Russian: Большой луг, original name in the beginning of 18th century), Tsaritsa's Meadow (Russian: Царицынский луг, until 1818)
Kalinin Square	площадь Калинина	former name (Russian: русское название, 1???-1???)
Kazanskaya Square	Казанская площадь	Plekhanov Square (Russian: площадь Плеханова, 1923-1944)
Kirovskaya Square	Кировская площадь	
Kulibin Square	площадь Кулибина	Goat Swamp (Russian: Козье болото, 1790-1846), Voskresenskaya Square (Russian: Воскресенская площадь (Resurrection Square), 1849-1952)
Komsomolskaya Square	Комсомольская площадь	
Labour Square	площадь Труда	Blagoveshchenskaya Street (Russian: Благовещенская улица, 1830s-1880s), Blagoveshchenskaya Square (Annunciation Square) (Russian: Благовещенская площадь, before 1918)
Lenin Square	площадь Ленина	Lenin Alley (Russian: аллея Ленина, 1924-1946)
Leo Tolstoy Square	площадь Льва Толстого	Bishop Square (Russian: Архиерейская площадь, 1798-1918)
Lomonosov Square	площадь Ломоносова	Chernyshev Square (Russian: площадь Чернышева, 1828-1948)
Manezhnaya Square	Манежная площадь	
Moskovskaya Square	Московская площадь	
Muzhestva Square	площадь Мужества	Murinskaya Square (Russian: Муринская площадь, before 1965)
Naval Glory Square	площадь Морской Славы	Primorskaya Square (Russian: Приморская площадь, before 1972)
Nikolskaya Square	Никольская площадь	Communard Square (Russian: площадь Коммунаров, 1923-1991)
Ostrovskogo Square	Площадь Островского	Alexander Square (Russian: Александринская площадь, 1816-1923)
Palace Square	Дворцовая площадь	
Pionerskaya Square	Пионерская площадь	
Pribaltiyskaya Square	Прибалтийская площадь	
Proletariat Dictatorship Square	площадь Пролетарской Диктатуры	Orlovskaya Square (Russian: Орловская площадь, before 1864), Lafonskaya Square (Russian: Лафонская площадь, 1864-1918), Dictatorship Square (Russian: площадь Диктатуры, 1918-1952)
Repin Square	площадь Репина	Kalinkinskaya Square (Russian: Калинкинская площадь, before 1952)
Rumyantsev Square	Румянцевская площадь	Shevchenko Square (Russian: площадь Шевченко, 1939-2001)
Saint Isaac's Square	Исаакиевская площадь	Vorovsky Square (Russian: площадь Воровского, 1923-1944)
Sakharov Academician Square	площадь Академика Сахарова	nameless before 1996
Semenovskaya Square	Семеновская площадь	
Sennaya Square	Сенная площадь	Peace Square (Russian: площадь Мира, 1952-1991)
Shevchenko Square	площадь Шевченко	nameless before 2001
Stable Square	Конюшенная площадь	
Stachek Square	площадь Стачек	Narvskaya Square (Russian: Нарвская площадь, before 1923)
Suvorov Square	Суворовская площадь	
Technology Square	Технологическая площадь	
Teatralnaya Square	Театральная площадь	Karuselnaya Square (Russian: Карусельная площадь, before the 1780s)
Trinity Square	Троицкая площадь	Commune Square (Russian: площадь Коммуны, 1918-1923), Revolution Square (Russian: площадь Революции, 1923-1991)
Turgenev Square	площадь Тургенева	Pokrovskaya Square (Russian: Покровская площадь, before 1923)
Victory Square	площадь Победы	Middle Crotch or Srednyaya Rogatka (Russian: Средняя рогатка, before 1962)
Vladimirskaya Square	Владимирская площадь	Trade Square or Torgovaya Ploshchad (Russian: Торговая площадь, 1739-1923), Nakhimson Square (Russian: площадь Нахимсона, 1923-1950),
Vosstaniya Square	площадь Восстания	Znamenskaya Square (Russian: Знаменская площадь, before 1918)
