= Theatre Square (Saint Petersburg) =

Square in St.Petersburg

Coordinates: 59°55′32″N 30°17′55″E

The Mariinsky Theatre on Theatre Square (2006)

The Saint Petersburg Conservatory on Theatre Square (2006)

Theatre Square or Teatralnaya Square (Russian: Театральная площадь, Teatralnaya ploshchad) is a city square in Saint Petersburg, Russia. It was established in early 1760s and initially was known under the name Карусельная пл (Merry-go-round Square). It acquired its current name in 1821.

== See also ==
- List of squares in Saint Petersburg
