= Russian Red Cross Society =

National Red Cross Society in Russia

- Российский Красный Крест
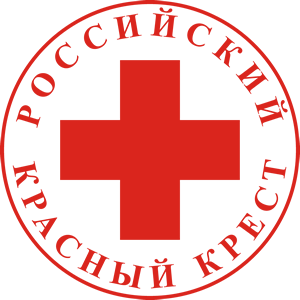
- Formation: 15 May 1867; 159 years ago [3 May 1867 Old Style]
- Headquarters: 5 Cheryomushkinsky Drive, Akademichesky District, Moscow, Russia
- Chairman: Savchuk Pavel Olegovich
- Volunteers: 65,000 (2019)
- Website: redcross.ru

The Russian Red Cross Society (Russian: Российский Красный Крест, romanized: Rossiyskiy Krasny Krest, IPA: [rɐˈsʲijskʲɪj 'krasnɨj 'krʲest]) is a volunteer-led, humanitarian organization that provides emergency assistance, disaster relief and education in Russia. It is the designated national affiliate of the International Federation of Red Cross and Red Crescent Societies.

It is now particularly concerned with problems relating to undocumented migrants, and, with the help of the international federation, provides food parcels and support to people who are detained.

It was established by the order of Emperor Alexander II. Grand Duchess Elizabeth Feodorovna was responsible for the organization in Moscow.

There were 109 Red Cross schools of nursing in Russia in 1914. 25,000 Sisters of Mercy were trained between 1914 and 1916. The society ran short courses for nurses and sanitary workers in Moscow in 1919 and provided support for mentally ill soldiers.

== Controversies ==
In October 2022, during the Russian invasion of Ukraine, the Russian Red Cross reduced government costs of the invasion by raising money to help support Russian soldiers fighting in Ukraine and their families. In November, Ukraine's Parliamentary Commissioner for Human Rights accused the Russian Red Cross of stealing ten premises, office equipment, and vehicles in Russian-controlled Crimea from the Ukrainian Red Cross.

Russian Red Cross operations in the occupied territories of Ukraine was criticised as a violation of the basic ICRC rules and its links to the nationalist organisation All-Russia People's Front (earlier headed by current RRCS head Savchuk) and other paramilitary organizations in Russia. The RRCS was also involved in fundraising and procurement of exclusively military equipment such as thermal vision for Russian army and held an annual gala at "Avangard" arms factory in Moscow. Other RRCS officials have praised the "special military operation" and described Ukrainians as "Nazis" with whom any ceasefire talks don't make sense. In 2023, the Russian government decided to gradually replace ICRC operations in occupied territories and registered commercial companies with similar names - Donetsk Red Cross and Luhansk Red Cross.

== See also ==
- Pyatigorsk Colony of the Russian Red Cross Society
