= Streshnev =

Streshnev, feminine: Streshneva is a Russian surname derived from the Polish surname Tomaszewski. Notable people with the surname include:

- Eudoxia Streshneva
- Pyotr Glebov-Streshnev
- Pyotr Streshnev
- Tikhon Streshnev
- Yelizaveta Glebova-Streshneva
- Yevgenia Shakhovskaya-Glebova-Streshneva
