= Tomashevsky =

Tomashevsky or Tomashevskiy, feminine: Tomashevskaya is a Russian surname derived from the Polish surname Tomaszewski. Notable people with the surname include:

- Andrey Tomashevsky (1894–1956), Soviet general
- Apollinary Tomashevsky (1890–1926), Russian imperial and Soviet military and test pilot
- Boris Tomashevsky (1890–1957), Russian literary scholar and historian
- Evgeny Tomashevsky (born 1987), Russian chess grandmaster
- Lidia Tomashevskaya (born 1995), Russian chess player

== See also ==
- Thomashefsky
