= Pyotr Glebov-Streshnev =

Pyotr Fyodorovich Glebov-Streshnev
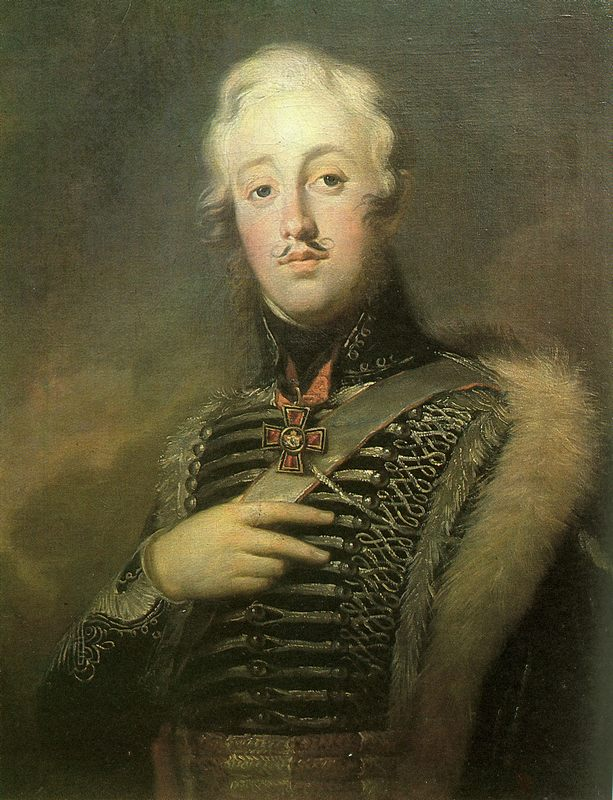
- Born: April 30, 1773
- Died: October 23, 1807 (34 years old)
- Occupation: Officer
- Spouse: Anna Vasilyevna Drutskaya-Sokolinskaya
- Children: Yevgenia Shakhovskaya-Glebova-Streshneva
- Parents: Fyodor Glebov (father); Yelizaveta Petrovna Glebova-Streshneva (mother)

Pyotr Fyodorovich Glebov-Streshnev (Russian: Пётр Фёдорович Гле́бов-Стре́шнев; April 20, 1773 – October 23, 1807) was a major general and chief of the Olviopol Hussar Regiment from 1801 to 1804.

== Biography ==
He was born in St. Petersburg to General-in-Chief Fyodor Glebov (1734–1799), who built the Znamenskoye-Rayok Estate, and his wife, Lady of State Yelizaveta Glebova-Streshneva (1751–1837). He is the godson of Catherine the Great. His military service includes:

- May 28, 1800 – October 10, 1800: commander of the Olviopol Hussar Regiment
- October 21, 1800 – December 1, 1800: chief of the Sumy 1st Hussar Regiment
- January 12, 1800 – December 27, 1801: Commander of the Sumy Hussar Regiment
- December 27, 1801 – September 5, 1804: commander of the Olviopol Hussar Regiment
- September 5, 1804 – May 24, 1807: Major General, Chief of the Olviopol Hussar Regiment. He took part in the campaigns against the French, commanded a cavalry brigade as part of the 8th Infantry Division of Lieutenant General Peter Essen (1772–1844), fought at the Battle of Eylau, the Battle of Friedland and the Battle of Heilsburg.

He died after being wounded on October 27, 1807, and was buried in the family tomb next to his parents in the Donskoy Monastery in Moscow. The poet Ivan Dolgorukov composed an epitaph after his death.

== Family ==
His wife, Anna Vasilyevna Drutskaya-Sokolinskaya (born 1785), was the daughter of Prince Vasily Ivanovich Drutsky-Sokolinsky. The mother of the latter considered this marriage unequal, since the Drutskys were not as noble as the Glebovs. After being widowed, Anna Vasilyevna married Staff Captain Aleksander Leslie in 1810 (1781 – April 27, 1856). Her four children from her first marriage were brought up in Moscow by their grandmother Yelizaveta Petrovna Glebova-Streshneva. Despite their wealth, they were brought up in a very strict manner.

- Evgraf Petrovich (died 1852 or 1864) was a colonel of the guard, and after the death of his grandmother, since 1837, he was the owner of the Pokrovskoye-Streshnevo estate. He died without children.
- Praskovya Petrovna (d. 1857) married the merchant Fyodor Fyodorovich Tomashevsky, and her name was no longer mentioned in the family.
- Natalya Petrovna (1804–1881), was married to major general Fyodor Logginovich von Brevern (1802–1863). She died of gastritis in Wiesbaden, and she was buried there in an Orthodox cemetery. Her daughter Yevgenia Fyodorovna (1846–1924) married Mikhail Valentinovich Shakhovsky, who in 1864 was given the name and coat of arms of the Glebov-Streshnevs.
- Fyodor Petrovich (1806–1864) was a colonel (1843), and participant in the Russo-Turkish war.
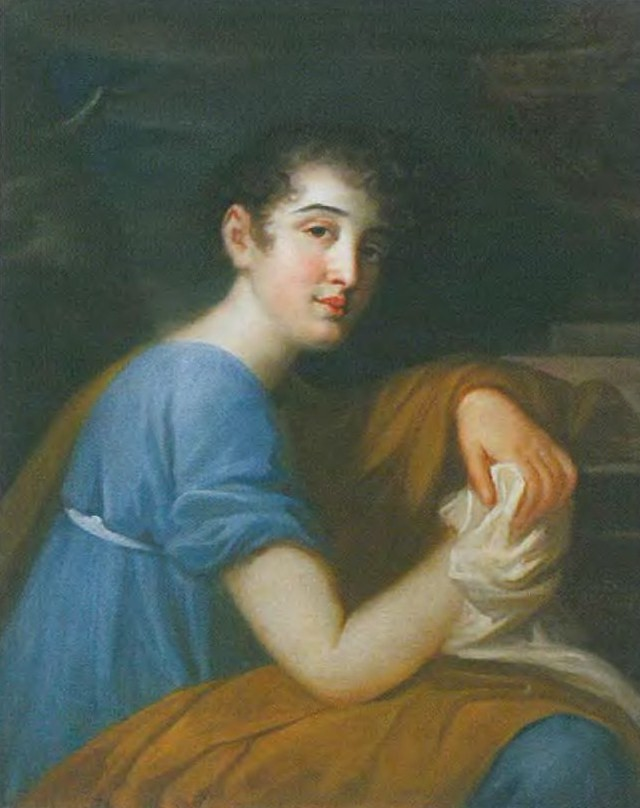
Anna Vasilyevna Drutskaya-Sokolinskaya in a portrait by Fyodor Kinel (1810)

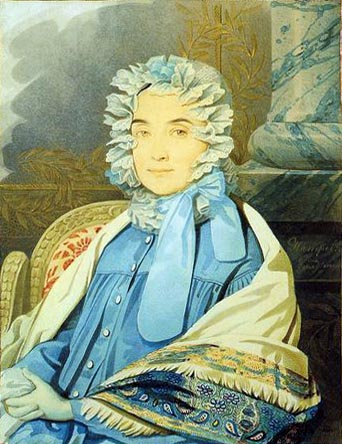
Natalya Petrovna in a portrait by Karl von Hampeln (1830s)

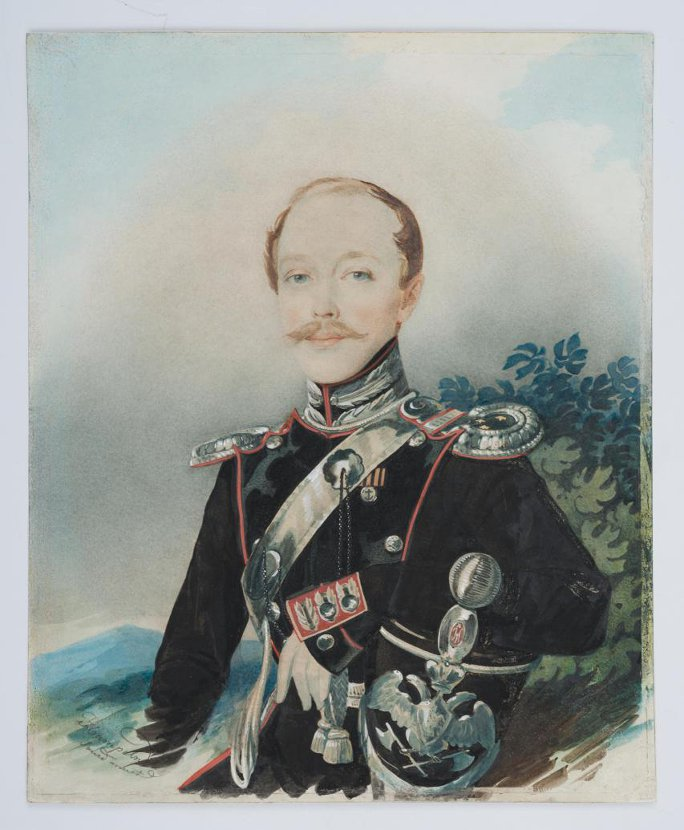
Fyodor Petrovich in a portrait by Karl von Hampeln (1830s)

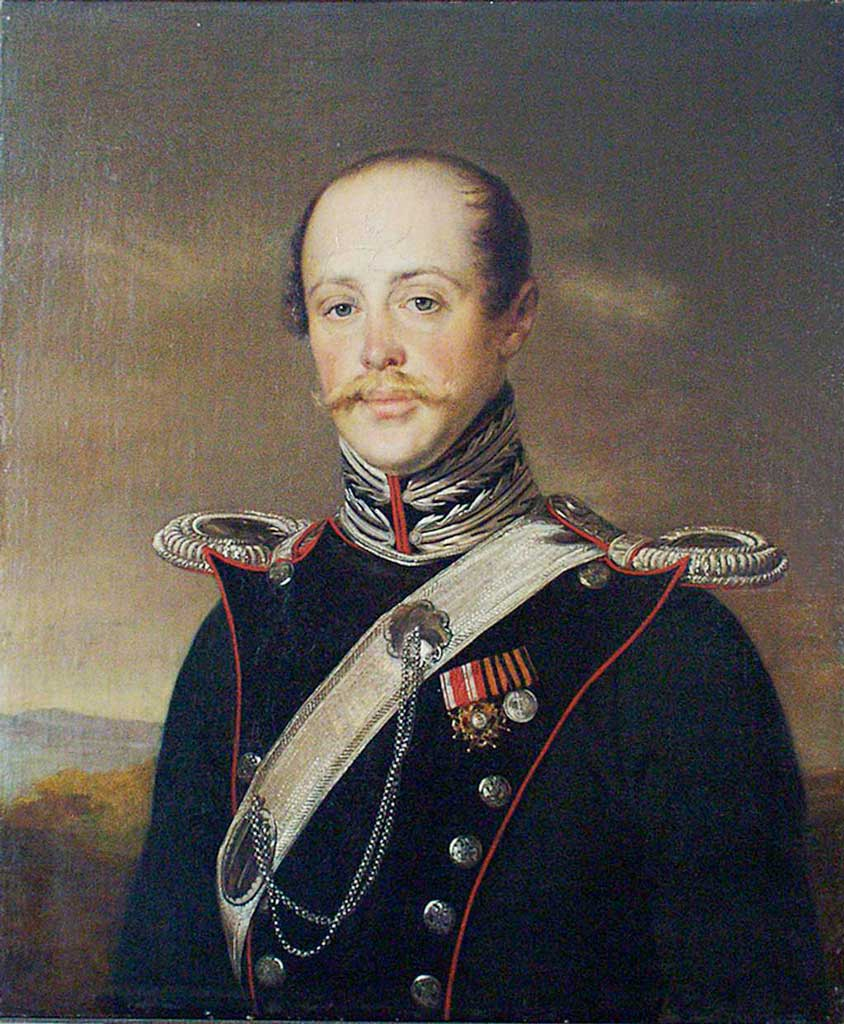
Fyodor Petrovich in a portrait by Vasily Tropinin (1840)

== Ancestry ==
Ancestors of Pyotr Glebov-Streshnev

7. Fyodor Nikitich Glebov
4. Ivan Fyodorovich Glebov
2. Fyodor Ivanovich Glebov
Pyotr Fyodorovich Glebov-Streshnev
8. Ivan Rodionovich Streshnev
5. Pyotr Ivanovich Streshnev
3. Yelizaveta Petrovna Glebova-Streshneva
9. Pyotr Ivanovoch Yakovlev
6. Natalya Petrovna Yakovleva
