= Thomashefsky =

Thomashefsky is a surname that is a variant of the Polish masculine surname Tomaszewski or the Russian Tomashevsky. Notable people with the surname include:

- Bessie Thomashefsky (1873–1962), Ukrainian-born Jewish American singer, actress and comedian
- Boris Thomashefsky (1868–1939), Ukrainian-born Jewish American singer and actor

== See also ==
- Michael Tilson Thomas (1944–2026), Jewish American conductor, composer and pianist. The surname was changed from Thomashefsky by his father, Ted, who was the son of Boris and Bessie.
