= Pokrovskoye-Streshnevo =

Estate in Moscow, Russia

Coordinates: 55°48′55″N 37°28′18″E

- Покровское-Стрешнево
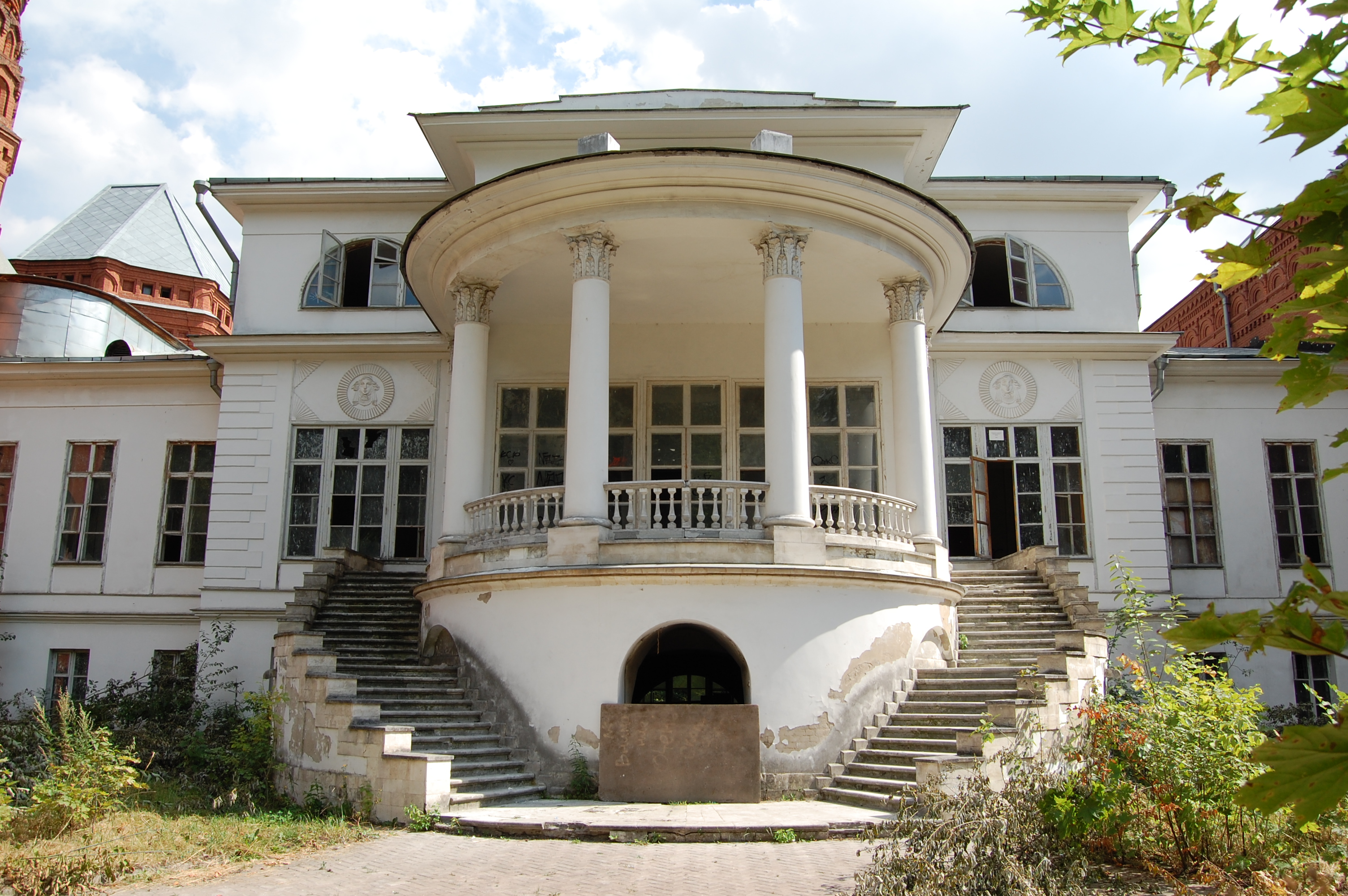
- The estate in August 2012
- Interactive map of the Pokrovskoye-Streshnevo area

General information
- Location: Pokrovskoye-Streshnevo District, Volokolamskoye Shosse, 52 строение 1, Moscow, Russia, 125367, Russia

Pokrovskoye-Streshnevo (

Russian: Покро́вское-Стре́шнево) is an estate in the north-west of Мoscow. Other names include Pokrovskoye-Glebovo and Glebovo-Streshnevo. It has a manor house in the classicism style, a church from the 17th century, and other various Russian Revival architecture buildings.

== Early history ==
In the Middle Ages, on the site of the current estate, there was a village named Podjolki (

Russian: Подъёлки). The name is derived from the forest that was in the area. The area, like neighboring Tushino, belonged to the boyar Rodion Nestorovich and his descendants. At the end of Ivan the Terrible's reign, deacon E. I. Blagovo bought the land. By this time, the village was deserted, as evidenced by the records from 1584—1585, where Pokrovskoye-Streshnevo was mentioned for the first time.

In 1608, in this area, False Dmitry II built the Tushino Camp. Among his associates was the new owner of the area, Andrei Fyodorovich Palitsyn. He eventually became a law-abiding citizen, advanced in the military, became a voivode in Мurom and in 1622 he sold Podjolki to the diak Mikhail Feofilatievich Danilov.

Under Danilov, a village with the same name sprang up on the site.

== Estate under the first Streshnevs ==
After the death of the diak, the estate was briefly owned by F. K. Yelizarov, who in 1664 sold Pokrovskoye to Rodion Matveyevich Streshnev, the owner of neighboring Ivankovo. Since 1664, the estate has been owned by the Streshnev family for almost 250 years. This family was considered not noble until 1626, when Eudoxia Streshneva married tsar Michael of Russia. The pair had 10 children, including the future tsar Alexis of Russia.

Since then, the family had a prominent place in the court hierarchy.

Rodion Streshnev served the first four tsars of the Romanov dynasty and from the late 1670s he was the tutor of Peter the Great. He also took part in Peter's coronation. After the purchase of Pokrovskoye, Rodion Streshnev did not particularly rebuild the village: he simply installed a “boyar court”, and several economic services. In 1678, there were "9 married couples, 10 families with 30 people in them, a clerk's yard, a peasant's yard, with 7 people in it, and a Bobyl yard with 3 people in it."

In 1685, he ordered people to dig ponds at the river head of the Chernushka River and breed fish in them.

Starting in 1664, the estate was in the hands of the descendants of Rodion Streshnev for two and a half centuries, passing through six generations. Since the second half of the 18th century, the owners have positioned it as a memorial to the merits of the Streshnev family. A portrait gallery was created at the estate. The gallery is one of the few surviving estate portrait collections now with the State Historical Museum.

The obelisk in front of the estate is an imitation of the obelisk in the Alexander Garden of the Kremlin.

After the death of Rodion Streshnev in 1687, the estate passed to his son Ivan Rodionovich Streshnev. Under Ivan in 1704, in the village of Pokrovskoye, there were: a yard of votchinas, a cattle yard, and 9 peasant yards, which had 34 people.

== Estate under Pyotr Streshnev ==
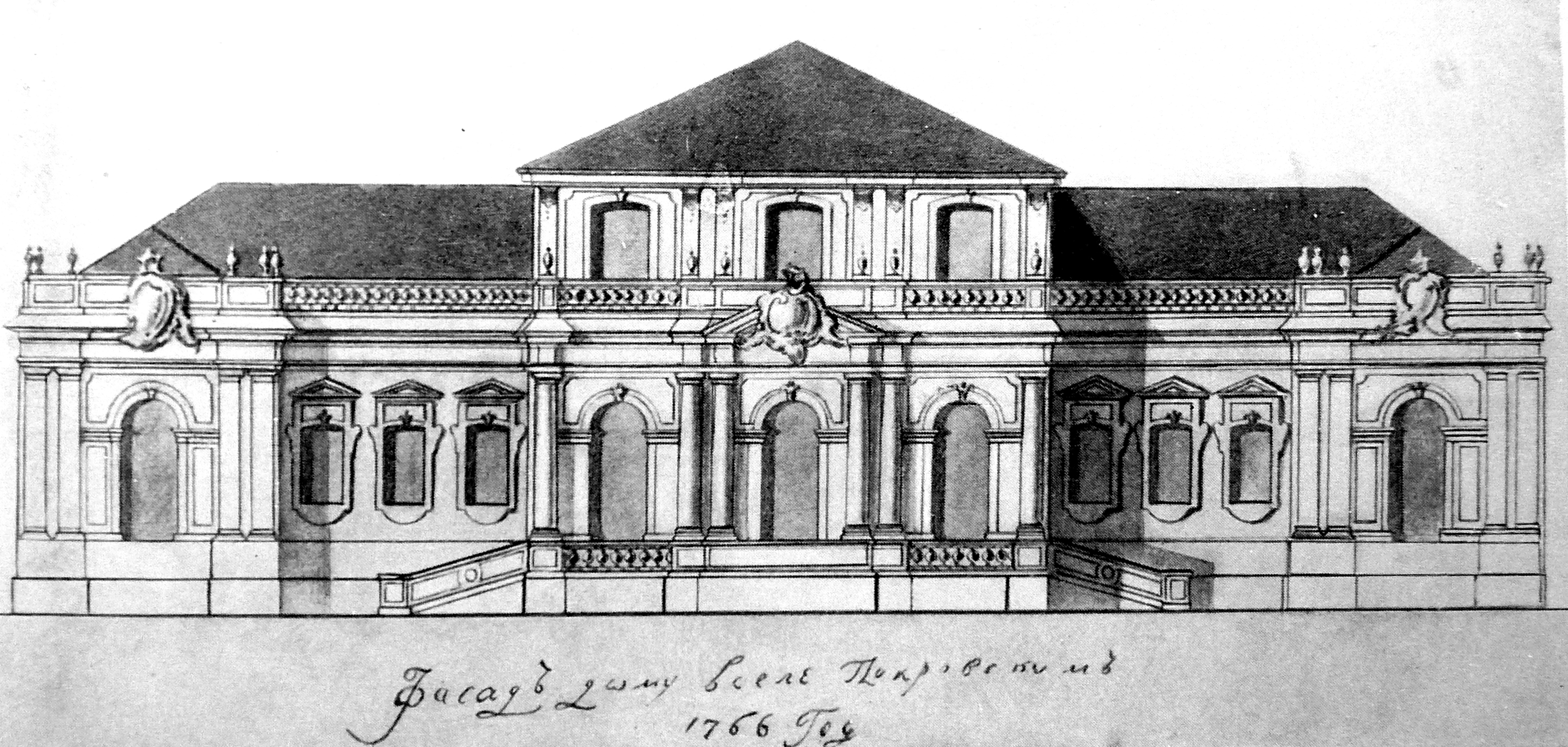
Pokrovskoe-Streshnevo in 1766. Front of the main house.

After the death of Ivan Rodionovich Streshnev (1738), his inheritance was divided among his sons, and Pokrovskoye went to General-in-Chief Pyotr Streshnev (died 1771). Under him, the family estate began to expand and change in the spirit of the times. After the Manifesto on Freedom of the Nobility (1762) was published, which freed Russian nobles from compulsory military or state service, Streshnev immediately retired from the military. Pyotr Streshnev's children died in infancy or in early childhood, so in 1750 he vowed to revive the estate's church in order to beg for another child. In the 1750s, the church was rebuilt in a Baroque style. In 1766, a stone manor house was built in the Elizabethan Baroque style with a suite of 10 front rooms and a collection of more than 130 paintings. By the end of the century, the number of paintings in the collection exceeded 300.

== Estate under Yelizaveta Glebova-Streshneva ==
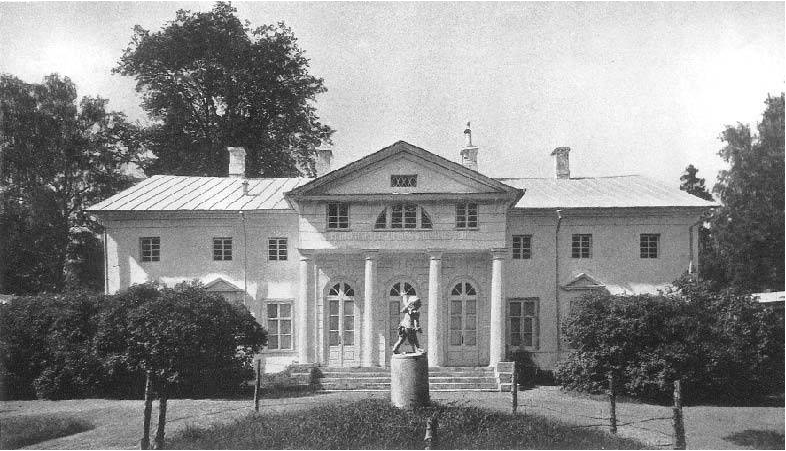
Bathroom house in Yelizavetino and a marble statue of Cupid in front of it. Photo from the 1910s

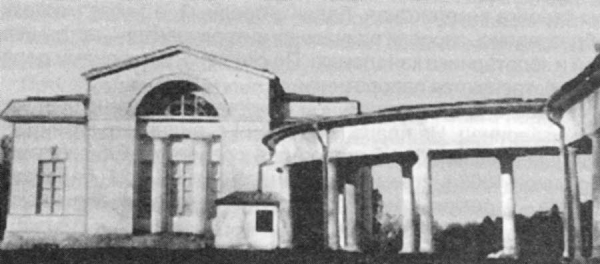
Yelizavetino Rotunda

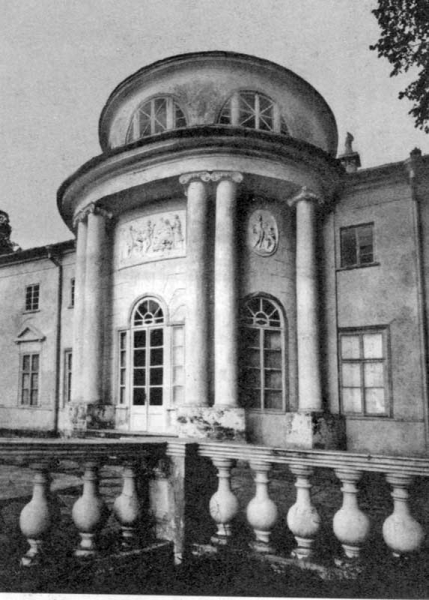
Yelizavetino, facade of the bathroom house

Yelizaveta, the only surviving child of Pyotr Ivanovich Streshnev, was his favorite. Spoiled as a child, she grew up to be an eccentric lady with a temper. Although Pyotr fulfilled all the whims of his daughter, he opposed her desire to marry a widower with a child, Fyodor Ivanovich Glebov. A year after the death of her father, Yelizaveta Streshneva married Glebov, explaining that: "I was never in love with my husband, but I married him because I realized that he was the only person I could have power over, while still respecting him." In 1803, after the death of her cousin, the male line of her surname ended, so she obtained permission from Alexander I for the right for her and her children to have the Glebov-Streshnev surname.

A verst from the estate, on the banks of a river, Fyodor Glebov built an elegant two-story bathroom house, named "Yelizavetino." According to the official version of events, Yelizavetino was destroyed by a German bomb in 1942, although this has been disputed.

There was a menagerie next to the bathroom house. According to an inventory from 1805, it contained 21 deer, 13 rams, 9 goats, and 109 rare birds.

In 1775, Pokrovskoye-Streshnevo was visited by Catherine the Great, who was in Moscow for celebrations after the signing of the Treaty of Küçük Kaynarca.

Fyodor Glebov died in 1799. Yelizaveta Petrovna continued to keep family portraits and relics. In the main manor house, on the walls of the front rooms, the coats of arms of the Streshnevs and Glebovs were hung up. Yelizaveta Petrovna ran her estate in a very strict manner. Her children and grandchildren were raised in a very strict environment. She was known in society as an educated woman, and the house had a good library and modern technical innovations such as a telescope and a microscope. In his book “Old Estates: Essays on the History of Russian Noble Culture”, one of the most famous art historians of the early 20th century, Nikolai Wrangel, wrote about Pokrovskoye-Streshnev.

== Estate under Yevgenia Shakhovskaya ==
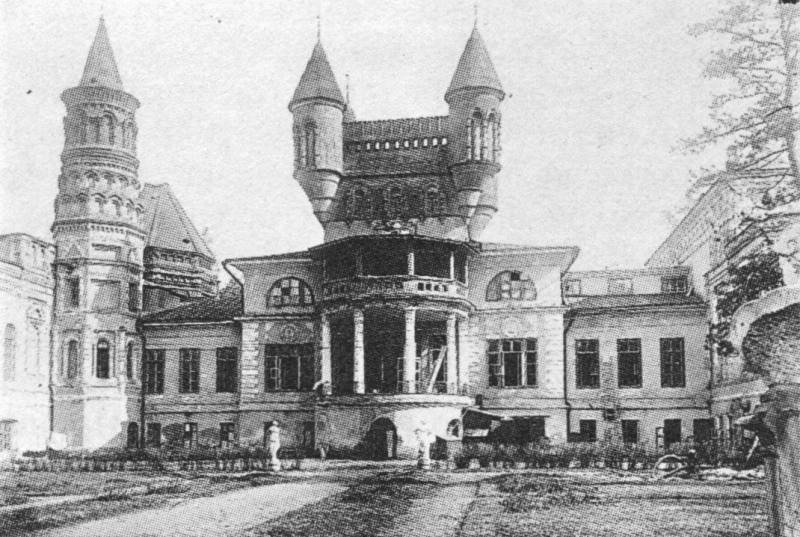
The facade of the house in a photo from the 1930s.

After the death of Yelizaveta Petrovna Glebova-Streshneva in 1837 the estate passed to Fyodor Petrovich Glebov-Streshnev (the son of Pyotr Fyodorovich Glebov-Streshnev). In 1864, the estate passed to his niece Yevgenia Fyodorovna Brevern, who married Mikhail Shakhovsky-Glebov-Streshnev. Due to the end of the male line of the Glebov-Streshnev family, the couple took the triple surname Shakhovsky-Glebov-Streshnev. At this time, Pokrovskoye-Streshnevo was increasingly called Pokrovskoye-Glebovo.

In 1852, in the village of Pokrovskoye, there were 10 households, where 40 males and 42 females lived, a church and a manor house. 30 years later, there were 15 households with 263 people, two shops, and 22 dachas.

Yevgenia Fyodorovna Shakhovskaya-Glebova-Streshneva, who turned out to be the last owner of the estate, decided to turn the family estate into a kind of fairy-tale medieval castle. In 1880, the architects Aleksander Rezanov and Konstantin Tersky began renovations. Other buildings were added in 1883, some of them in the form of stylized castle turrets (the northeastern octagonal tower was designed in 1893 by Fyodor Kolbe). The entrance part of the main facade was rebuilt and barrel-shaped brick columns were added. The balusters were replaced with lattices with floral ornaments and the stairs around the balcony near the garden were dismantled.

From 1889-1890, according to the notes of the architects Fyodor Kolbe and Aleksander Popov, a Russian style stone fence with red brick towers was built around the estate. In the 1980s the central entrance leading to the church was rebuilt.

An obelisk was built in front of the new facade facing the gate. At one time, it was topped with a dog figurine, which caused an erroneous, still existing idea that it was actually the grave of the owner of the estate's dog. The dog figurine was actually a reference to the Streshnev family's coat of arms which has a dog standing on its hind legs as a sign of devotion on it. Several obelisks were also built after royal family members visited the estate, to commemorate the occasion. The estate was repeatedly visited by members of the Romanov family and obelisks were built. At the beginning of the 19th century, Maria Feodorovnа, the widow of Paul I, and Elizabeth Alexeievna, the wife of Alexander I, visited and their visits were commemorated with obelisks.

The old Church was also rebuilt, and expanded with side altars for Saint Nicholas, Saint Peter and Saint Paul. Many guests came, especially in summer. Yevgenia Fyodorovna was very wealthy. She owned Villa San Donato in Italy, a yacht in the Mediterranean, and a railroad carriage to travel south. However, she spent most of her time at her family estate.

In 1897, Sophia Tolstaya complained in a letter to her husband: "In Pokrovskoye, it is very sad that the anger of the hostess is visible everywhere: everything is fenced with barbed wire, evil watchmen are everywhere, and you can only walk along dusty, high roads."

In 1901, the Moscow-Vindava (now Rizhsky) railway was built, and a railway platform was opened in front of the estate. In 1908, a stone station building was built by the architect Brzhozovsky.

In the 1910s, as evidenced by materials from the Shakhovsky-Glebov-Streshnev family archive in the State Historical Museum, Yevgenia Shakhovskaya-Glebova-Streshneva made many changes in the estate. In the regular part of the park, marble sculptures were installed, ordered from Antonio Bibolotti. The parterre was framed by busts of Roman emperors and sculptures of the philosophers Demosthenes and Sophocles. There was a total of 10 busts and about 20 full-length sculptures. In the 1950s, many of the surviving sculptures were transferred to the museum-estate Kuskovo.

The estate lobby was redecorated and the current marble staircase and sculptures of fauns were installed. Most likely the masks of satyrs that are on the fireplaces of the White Hall were installed at the same time. They were restored in the 1990s, but were lost after vandalism in the 2010s.

In 1912, a large amount of family jewels were stolen from the estate, including the “pink diamond” that belonged first to the Romanovs. The story is told in a memoir by the head of the Moscow detective police Arkady Koshko.

== Dachas on the estate ==
At the beginning of the 19th century, on the opposite side of the road from Vsekhsvyatskoye to Tushino (where the Volokolamsk highway is currently) a settlement of 22 dachas were built. Dachas in Pokrovsky were very expensive, and there was a toll barrier at the entrance to the village. In 1807, Nikolay Karamzin lived here while working on his book, "The History of the Russian State." In 1856, Leo Тolstoy often visited a dacha in the town. Tolstoy first met Sophia Behrs here and after 6 years of dating they married. Subsequently, a dacha was rented by the historian Sergey Solovyov, and his son Vladimir Solovyov. The dacha was demolished during Sophia Tolstaya's lifetime. The brother of the famous doctor Sergey Botkin, P. Botkin, rebuilt the estate's church with his own money.

At the end of the 19th century, dachas appeared at the other end of the current Pokrovskoye-Streshnevo estate, on the site of a former menagerie, in the Ivankovsky forest near the village of Ivankovo. Theater decorator Viktor Simov, built the first dacha in that area. Simov also built dachas for his colleagues, for example, the Grekovka dacha (1890s), the Chaika dacha (1904) for Vasily Luzhsky, and the dacha of the millionaire Vladimir Nosenkov, which Simov built in 1909 in collaboration with the well-known avant-garde artist Leonid Vesnin, one of the Vesnin brothers. Aleksey Tolstoy lived in a dacha in Ivankovo; his story "The Tempest" is dated in the manuscript as "June 10, 1915 Ivankovo". Marina Tsvetaeva and Sergei Efron also rented a dacha in Ivankovo in 1912.

Pokrovskoye continued to be a popular summer destination. At the beginning of the 20th century, cottages were rented from 100 to 2000 rubles per season and were so popular that in the summer of 1908 a bus service was arranged between Pokrovskoye and Petrovsky-Razumovsky (along the Petersburg highway).

== Manor after the Revolution ==
After the revolution, the estate, together with the many dachas, were requisitioned and turned into a sanatorium for the Central Committee, and the Yelizavetino bathroom house was transferred to a textile workers' rest home.

In 1919, a museum was opened in the main house, and the decor of the former manor estate was recreated. The purpose of the museum was to show "the decline of noble culture in the era of the dissolution of serfdom."

In 1923, the writer Viktor Shklovsky lived in the estate (his impressions were reflected in his book "The Third Factory").

It was widely thought that an attempt was made to open the museum in 1925, but for various reasons (lack of funding, poor exposure) it was soon closed and ruined. This claim is not true. The data of the State Historical Museum and the State Archives indicate the opposite. The museum was open for 8 years and was widely popular. In one summer, by the second half of the 1920s, more than 20 thousand people visited the museum. In winter, the estate archive was dismantled and it was eventually put in the Department of Written Sources in the State Historical Museum. This data was partially published in 2019 in one of the issues of the Moscow Journal, but did not attract attention.

In 1927, the museum closed.

After the closing of the museum, the Institute of Higher Nervous Activity and Neurophysiology was located the estate for some time. In 1933, a private sanatorium was in the estate. In wartime, the estate was used as a hospital.

In the 1930s, the main house underwent many changes: new window openings were cut, destroying the pattern of brickwork, a concrete staircase was broken in the southwestern building, and the barrel-shaped columns were cut down. By 1953, only a brick base remained from the balcony with a colonnade along the garden.

Dachas in Ivankovo remained a sanatorium for the Central Committee, specifically the Moscow City Party Committee. It was known as "Seagull" after Luzhsky's dacha (which since 1991 had been a boarding house of the Moscow Mayor's Office). In 1920, Lenin visited Inessa Armand here. Aleksey Tolstoy also continued to vacation here. Mikhail Bulgakov wrote in his diary on September 2, 1923: “Today I went with Kataev to the dacha of Alexei Tolstoy (Ivankovo). He was very nice today."

== The estate today ==
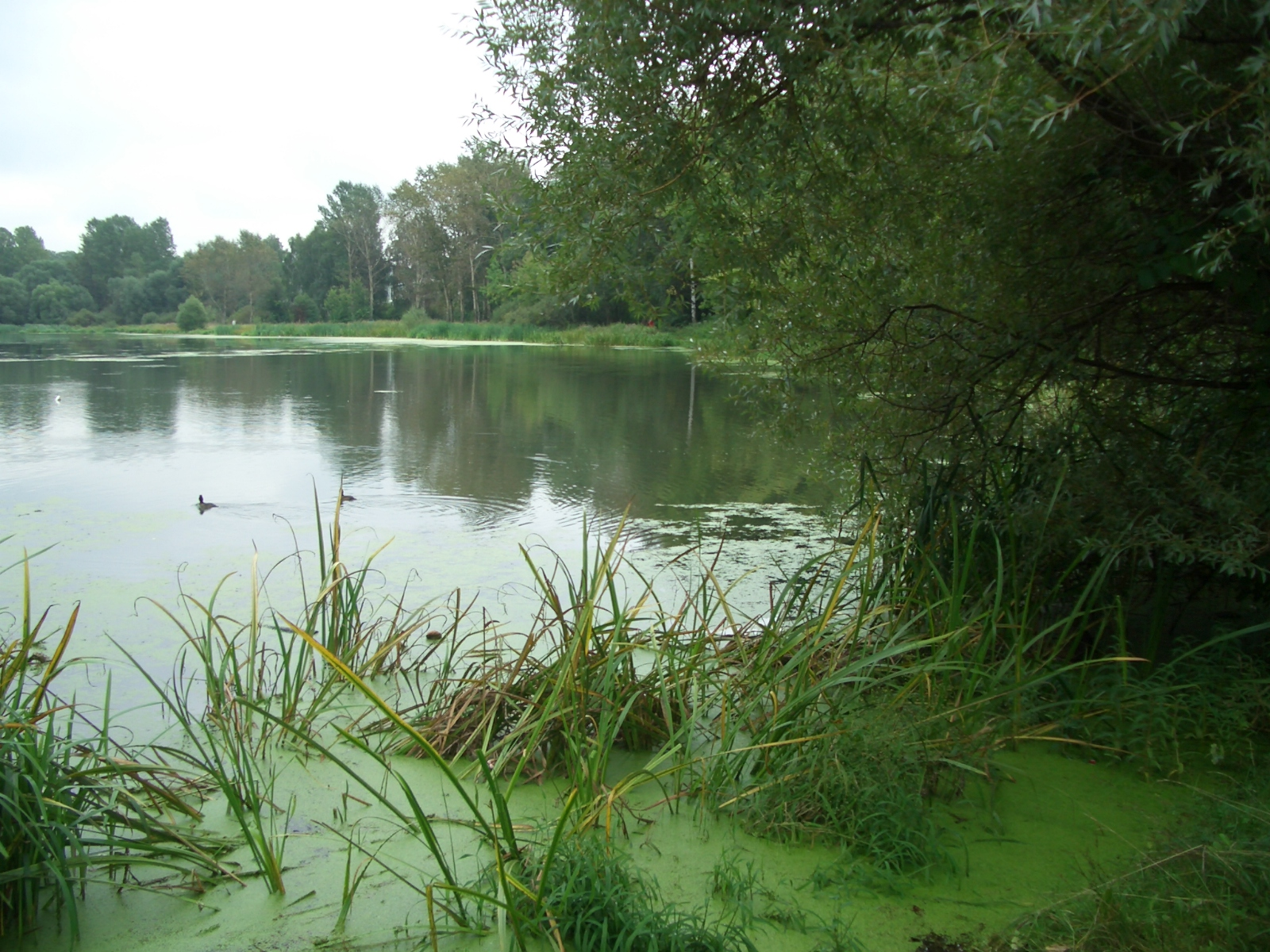
Pond near the Black River.

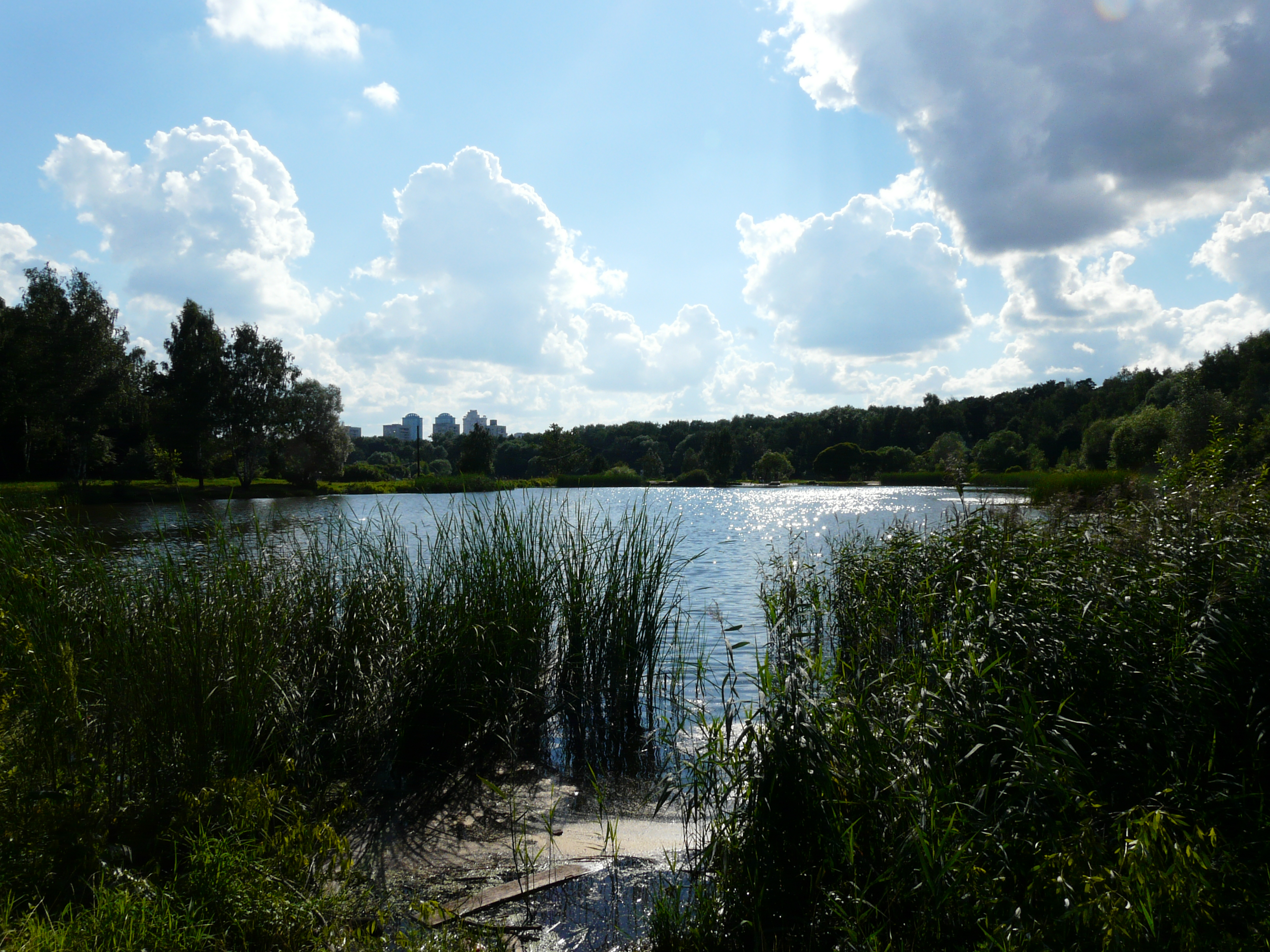
One of the ponds in Pokrovskoye-Streshnevo

In 1970, the Research Institute of Civil Aviation was here. In the 1980s, it belonged to Aeroflot, who had plans to build a reception center for civil aviation here.

In 1979, in accordance with the historical and architectural plan of Moscow, the entire Pokrovskoye-Streshnevo (Pokrovskoye-Glebovo) area was declared a protected area. At the same time, the restoration of the estate buildings began: the main house, the fence, and the corner tower, part of which collapsed in the winter of 1983-1984 were worked on.

In March 1992, the estate survived a serious fire. After a fire in the main house in 1992, restoration began. The old part of the house was restored to its original form from the 1800s, and the project was described as building a "cheap case for a diamond," according to the restorers. Approximately half of the restoration work has been completed. In the mid 1990s, the estate church was restored. Also in the mid 1990s, the greenhouse was completely restored. Nevertheless, due to a change in ownership, the work was interrupted, and the palace and buildings were again abandoned. The greenhouse was demolished again.

In November 2003, Aeroflot sold the estate to the company StroyArsenal for $2.8 million. However, in 2006, the Property Management Agency filed a lawsuit against Aeroflot and StroyArsenal to declare the sale and purchase invalid. On March 29, 2006, the court ruled against the Federal Property Management Agency, but the Agency appealed and on July 19, 2006 that decision was reversed. The court ruled to withdraw the property purchased by StroyArsenal and transfer it to the Federal Property Management Agency. The High Court of Arbitration upheld the decision.

By 2012 the estate was in disrepair. At the end of 2012, the estate was transferred to the Higher School of Economics, but restoration work did not begin, since a judicial arrest was imposed on the disputed property.

Four years later, in 2016, the Higher School of Economics stopped using the building. The unique estate was abandoned once again. A series of fires made it fall farther into disrepair. The greenhouse in particular burned numerous times.

Between 2012 and 2017, the estate, which was not properly supervised, was repeatedly vandalized. Serious damage was done to the garden façade, as well as to the interior of the house, and the greenhouse fell into ruin.

In 2017, the estate was transferred to the GPBU Mospriroda for operational management. The area around the house was officially closed for restoration work. In July 2017, the publishing house "Ruz Co" published a guide to the estate, compiled by researcher A.V. Potapenko.

The park is badly neglected and needs restoration work. The project for the restoration of the park was approved at hearings in December 2019.

In 2019, work began to restore the estate again. In 2020, a project for the restoration of the estate with an addition for a cultural and leisure center was approved. As of October 2021, the project is being coordinated with the departments of the Moscow Government.

Preparatory work for the restoration project began on December 20, 2021. The back territory is surrounded by a construction fence and construction trailers have been brought in.

Since June 2022, restoration has been carried out in the main house of the estate. Mold, moss and fungus are being treated, the white stone was dismantled for restoration from the basement and steps of the terrace and the columns are being restored.

== Estate in cinema ==
- In 1925, the movie "The Marriage of the Bear" was filmed in the estate. The picture conveys the appearance of the estate at the time well, when there were Gothic superstructures near the central part of the palace.
- In 1962, the gates of the estate were shown in the film "Seven Nannies."
- In 1998, in the final episode of the series "Petersburg Secrets", the gates of the estate and parts of the wall were used as the wall of the Peter and Paul Fortress in a scene where the prisoners were released.
- In 2011, the interior of the estate was a film set for several scenes for the film "Convoy" directed by Alexei Mizgiryov.
- In the fall of 2012, some scenes for the mini-series "Love for Love" by Sergei Ashkenazi were filmed in the estate.
- In the autumn of 2017, several scenes of the film "Axe Raiders" were filmed on the estate.
- In 2018, a music video was filmed for the song "About the Fool" by Nike Borzov in the estate.

== Pokrovskoe-Streshnevo Forest ==
Currently, the Pokrovskoye-Streshnevo forest is a large natural area and one of the largest recreational areas in the North West of Moscow along with Serebryany Bor. A linden park is on the north side of the manor house. Some very old trees have also been preserved there. The park has a variety of tree types, including pines, maples, larches, lindens, oaks, birchs, elms, cedars, spruces, and apple trees.

Many local residents frequently visit the ponds located in the eastern part of the park. There is a beach area around a large pond, with some trees.

The northern and northwestern parts of the park were created relatively recently where a mixed forest originally was. The layout has a system of paths.

The northwestern natural boundary of the park is the Khimka River, the only clean source of drinking water in Moscow as of 2009. The spring has several water pipes, where residents of neighboring and remote areas can collect clean drinking water. The spring had a mosaic panel depicting a swan princess that was destroyed after updates were made to the spring.
