= Yelizaveta Glebova-Streshneva =

Noblewoman

Yelizaveta Petrovna Glebova-Streshneva
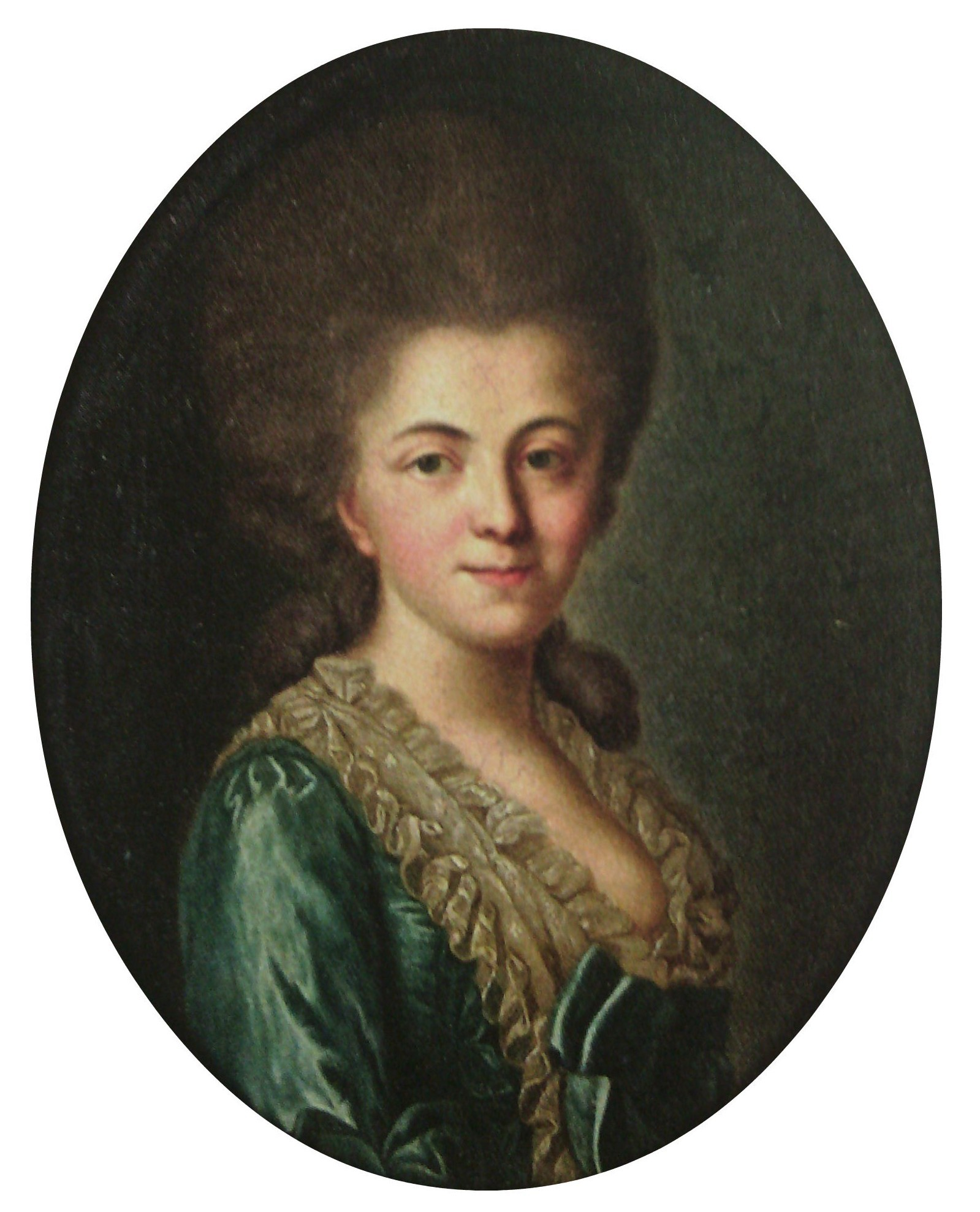
- Born: February 21, 1751
- Died: December 4, 1837 (86 years old); Moscow
- Spouse: Fyodor Glebov
- Children: Pyotr Glebov-Streshnev
- Parents: Pyotr Ivanovich Streshnev (father); Natalya Petrovna Yakovleva (mother)

Yelizaveta Petrovna Streshneva (Russian: Елизаве́та Петро́вна Стре́шнева, and after marriage Glebova, Russian: Гле́бова; February 21, 1751 — December 4, 1837) was a noblewoman known in society for her short temper, and was a lady-in-waiting, the last representative of the Boyar Streshnev family, and the owner of the Pokrovskoye-Streshnevo Estate.

== Biography ==
She was the daughter of General-in-Chief Pyotr Streshnev (1711–1771) and Natalya Petrovna Yakovleva (1716–1759), the daughter of Peter the Great's associate Pyotr Yakovlev. Yelizaveta Petrovna was named in honor of Elizabeth of Russia. She was her father's favorite and he frequently spoiled her, but when she decided to marry a widower with a child, Fyodor Glebov, who was 17 years older than her, he opposed the marriage.

Their marriage took place a year after the death of her father, in 1772. In her own opinion, "she was never in love with her husband, but she married him because she realized that he was the only person that she could have power over, while still respecting him." Three sons and a daughter were born in their marriage, of which two survived to adulthood, but still died before their mother:

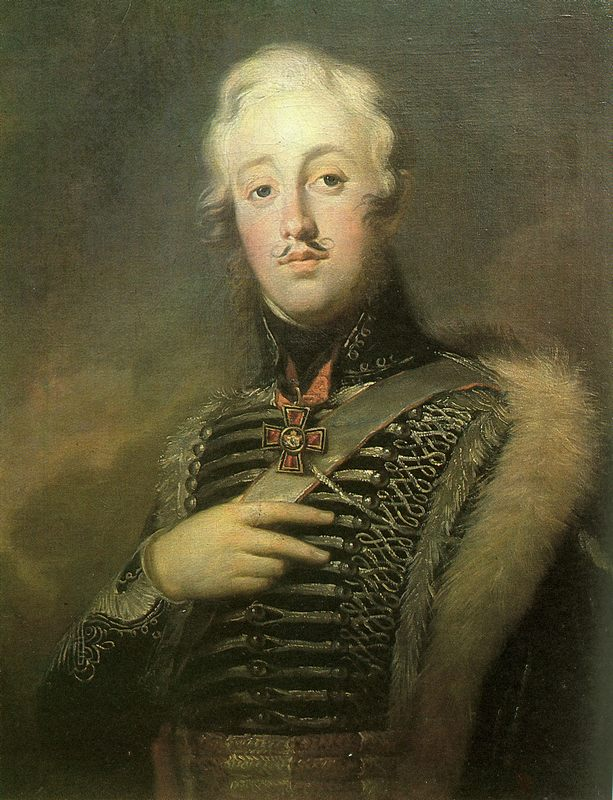
Pyotr Glebov-Streshnev, son

- Pyotr Glebov-Streshnev (1773–1807), was a major-general and a chief of the Olviopol Hussar Regiment. He died after being wounded in battle. He was married to Anna Vasilievna Drutskaya-Sokolinskaya, who was the daughter of a colonel.
- Dmitry Glebov-Streshnev (1782–1816) was a valet de chambre and he died unmarried. His mother never allowed him to marry or serve in the army. He lived in a wing of the Helikon Opera and often said that he was sick so as not to see his mother and be subjected to her discipline.

For his wife, General Glebov built an elegant two-story house in the village of Pokrovsky that he named after her. At the beginning of the 20th century, Baron Nikolai Wrangel wrote about the estate:

The house is full of fine English engravings and copies of family portraits. And at every step, in every room, it seems as if the shadows of those who lived here are wandering around. In the small red living room you can see the inscription: "On July 16, 1775 Catherine the Great visited Yelizavetino and have tea with its owner Elizabeth Petrovna Glebova-Streshneva."

After the death of her husband, Yelizaveta decided to remodel her estate in the classicism style. She was known as an educated woman, and she had a library in her estate with many modern technical innovations such as a telescope and microscope. The estate was one of the places where Nikolay Karamzin worked on "The History of the Russian State".

Over time, the Streshnev family's relationship with Tsaritsa Eudoxia Streshneva became an obsession for Yelizaveta. In 1803, Elizaveta Petrovna, through her cousin (Ivan Osterman) obtained permission for her sons, after the end of the Streshnev family name, to be called the Glebov-Streshnevs.

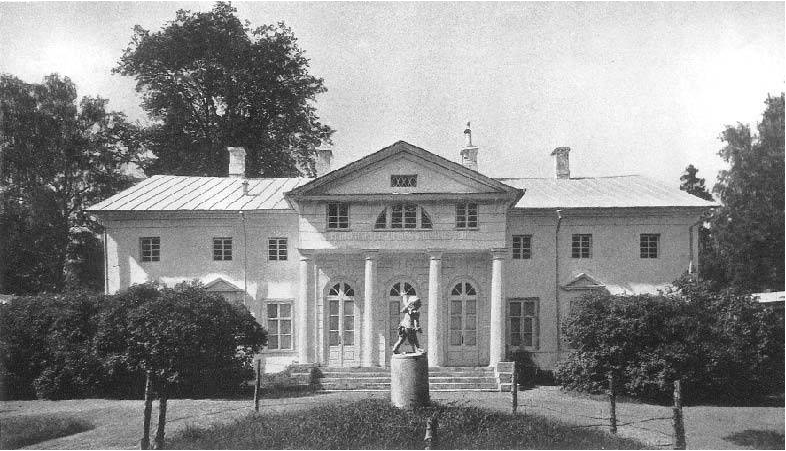
Bathing house in Elizavetino and a marble statue of Cupid in front of it. Photo from the 1910s

During the last years of her life, together with her grandchildren, she lived in Moscow in her house on Bolshaya Nikitskaya Street. In December 1817, she was awarded the Order of Saint Catherine, and on the day of the coronation of Emperor Nicholas I, she was awarded the title State Lady. According to memoirs, she was known for her strict, despotic disposition. Her grandchildren typically bore the brunt of her actions. She died in December 1837 and was buried next to her husband in the Donskoy Monastery. Archpriest John Rusinov spoke at her burial.

Y.P. Glebova-Streshneva was one of the most interesting personalities of her time, being a relic of olden times and a staunch bearer of the traditions of the Russian gentry. She was distinguished by her indomitable will and despotism, combined with pride and arrogance, and at the same time sensitivity. Others trembled before her. Yelizaveta raised her granddaughters, the daughters of her eldest son, in a Spartan way despite her wealth, realizing how much her father's spoiling had damaged her during her life.

— Russian Biographical Dictionary

The great-granddaughter of Yelizaveta Petrovna, Yevgenia Shakhovskaya-Glebova-Streshneva, wrote a biography about her in French titled "Mon aïeule" (Paris, 1898) and in German titled "Drei russische Frauengestalten" (Heidelberg, 1903), with a foreword by professor Kuno Fischer. Despite all of Yevgenia's respect for the memory of her great-grandmother, she mercilessly rebuilt the Pokrovskoe-Streshnevo Estate and the city estate on Bolshaya Nikitskaya Street in Moscow in a Russian Revival style. The city estate is now the Mayakovsky Theatre.
