= Tamašauskas =

- Lithuanian surname
- m.: Tamašauskas
- f.: (unmarried): Tamašauskaitė
- f.: (married): Tamašauskienė
- Related names: Tomaszewski

Tamašauskas is a Lithuanisn surname.

- Otis Tamasauskas
- Rita Tamašauskaitė

== See also ==
- Tamošauskas
