= Lidia Tomashevskaya =

Russian chess player

Personal information
- Born: May 27, 1995 (age 31)

Chess career
- Country: Russia
- Title: Woman International Master (2014)
- FIDE rating: 2085 (June 2019)
- Peak rating: 2240 (September 2014)

Lidia Tomashevskaya (formerly Tomnikova) (born May 27, 1995) is a Russian chess player who was awarded the title Woman International Master in 2014.

Tomnikova won the 2013 U-18 Girls' World Youth Chess Championship.
