= Tomaszewski =

Tomaszewski is a Polish masculine surname Its feminine counterpart is Tomaszewska or. Russian language variant: Tomashevsky (Tomashevskiy), Lithuanian: Tamašauskas. Notable people with the surname include:

- Andrzej Tomaszewski (1934–2010), Polish historian of art and culture, architect
- Antonina Tomaszewska
- Bohdan Tomaszewski (1921–2015), Polish sport journalist
- David Tomaszewski (born 1984), French music video director
- Dawid Tomaszewski (born 1980), Polish art fashion designer
- Ewa Tomaszewska
- Henryk Tomaszewski (1914–2005), Polish poster artist
- Henryk Tomaszewski (1919–2001), Polish mime artist and theatre director
- Irene Tomaszewski (born 1940), Polish-Canadian writer
- Izabela Tomaszewska
- Jan Tomaszewski (born 1948), Polish footballer
- Janusz Tomaszewski (born 1956), Polish politician
- Jerzy Tomaszewski (1930–2014), Polish historian
- Jerzy Tomaszewski (1924–2016), Polish photographer
- John Tomaszewski, American pathologist
- Marek Tomaszewski (born 1943), Polish pianist
- Marian Tomaszewski (1922–2020), Polish military officer and scout leader
- Natalia Tomaszewska
- Piotr Tomaszewski (born 1974), Polish guitarist
- Roman Tomaszewski (born 1960), Polish chess master
- Stanisław Miedza-Tomaszewski (1913–2000), Polish war artist and underground fighter
- Tadeusz Tomaszewski (born 1959), Polish politician
- Tadeusz Tomaszewski (1881–1950), Polish politician
- Tomasz Tomaszewski, Polish violinist
- Waldemar Tomaszewski (born 1965), Lithuanian politician of Polish ethnicity
