= Pyotr Streshnev =

Russian general-in-chief

Pyotr Ivanovich Streshnev
- Пётр Иванович Стрешнев
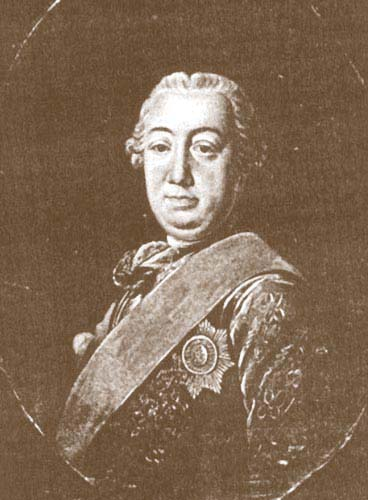
- Citizenship: Russian Empire
- Spouse: Natalya Petrovna (née Yakovleva)
- Children: Ivan, Pyotr and Yelizaveta
- Parents: Ivan Rodionovich Streshnev (father); Natalya Lvovna (née Velyaminova-Zernova) (mother)
- Awards: Order of Saint Alexander Nevsky

Pyotr Ivanovich Streshnev (1711—1771) was a Russian general-in-chief from the Streshnev family. He was the owner of the Pokrovskoye-Streshnevo Estate.

== Biography ==
Pyotr is the grandson of Rodion Streshnev. He is the fourth and youngest son of the pantler Ivan Rodionovich Streshnev (1665-1722) and Natalya Lvovna Velyaminova (1674-1733). He was born on May 24 (or June 4), 1711. His brothers are Mikhail, Nikolai and Vasily. His sisters are Marfa (the wife of count Andrey Osterman) and Praskovya (the wife of Prince Ivan Shcherbatov).

He entered the military in 1729. In 1740, he was promoted to major general, and from 1743—1744 he served on the Tsaritsynskaya line. From 1748—1752 he commanded troops in the Baltics, and since 1752 he was lieutenant general.

He commanded Moscow (1753-1758) and Ukrainian divisions (1758-1762). In 1758, he was awarded the Order of Saint Alexander Nevsky and the rank of general-in-chief. From 1761—1762 was governor-general in Kyiv. He was discharged April 2 1762. He died September 5 (or 16) 1771. He is buried in Donskoy Monastery, "in the refectory."

== Family ==
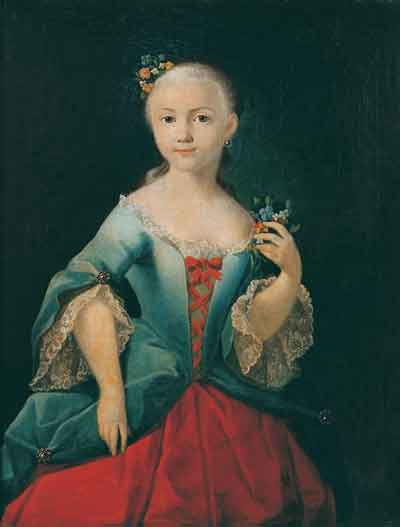
Pyotr's daughter Yelizaveta in a portrait by Ivan Argunov (1760)

Most of his children died in their early years. Pyotr's wife, Natalya Petrovna (1716—1759), née Yakovleva, daughter of Pyotr Yakovlev, took monastic vows. The tombstone in Chudov Monastery was lost during the Soviet era.

His only surviving daughter, Yelizaveta Glebova-Streshneva (1751—1837) married General-in-Chief Fyodor Glebov (1734—1799) and became the owner of the Pokrovskoye-Streshnevo Estate.

== Links ==
- Pyotr Ivanovich Streshnev on "Rodovid."
