= Znamenskoye-Rayok Estate =

- Усадьба Знаменское-Раёк (Russian)
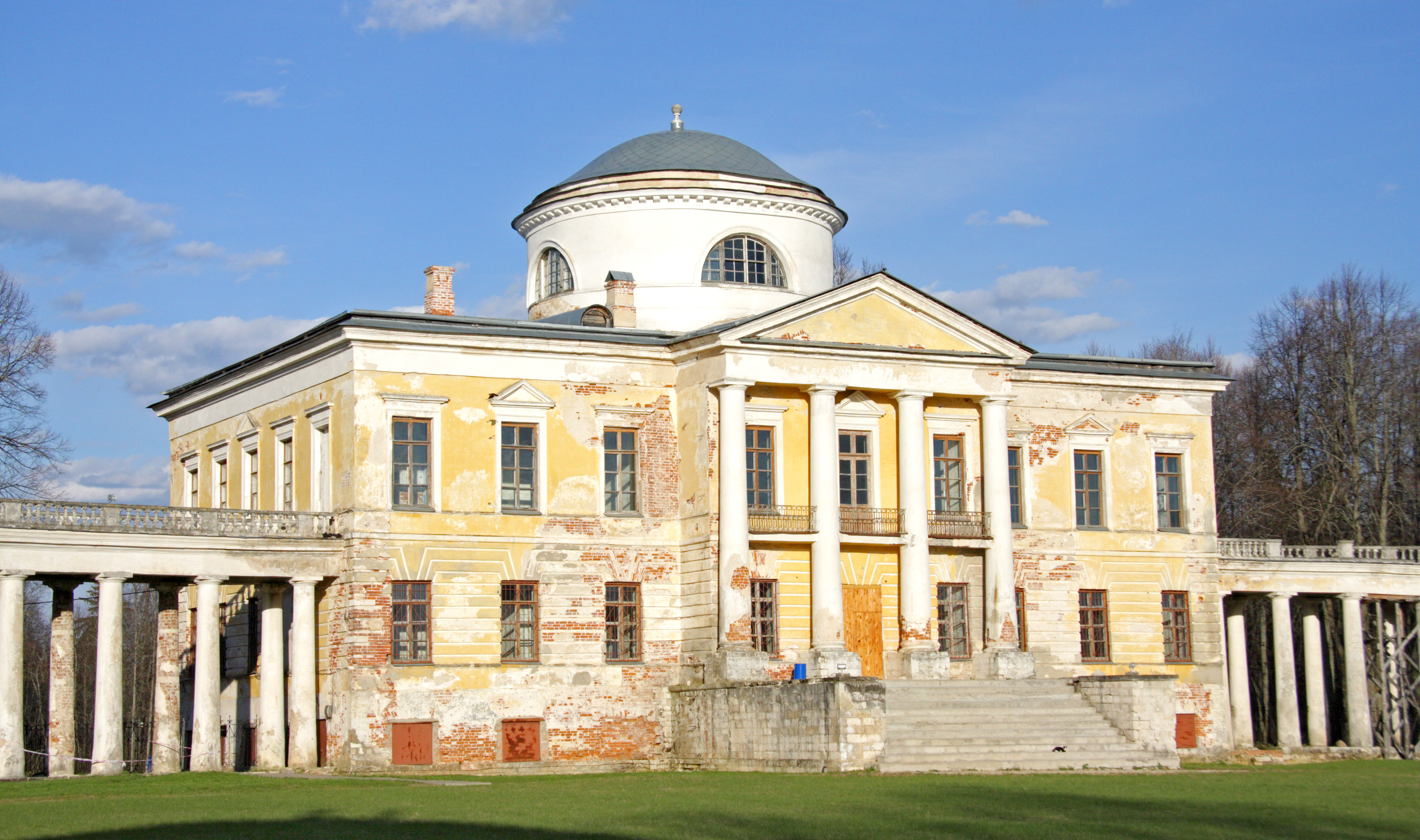
- Interactive map of Znamenskoye-Rayok Estate
- 56°57′19″N 35°15′11″E
- Location: Rayok, Tver Oblast, Russian Federation

Site notes
- Architect: Nikolay Lvov

Znamenskoye-Rayok is an estate in Тver Oblast (Maryinskoe Rural Settlement, Тorzhoksky District), Russia, that was built in the second half of the 18th century by Fyodor Glebov.

== History ==
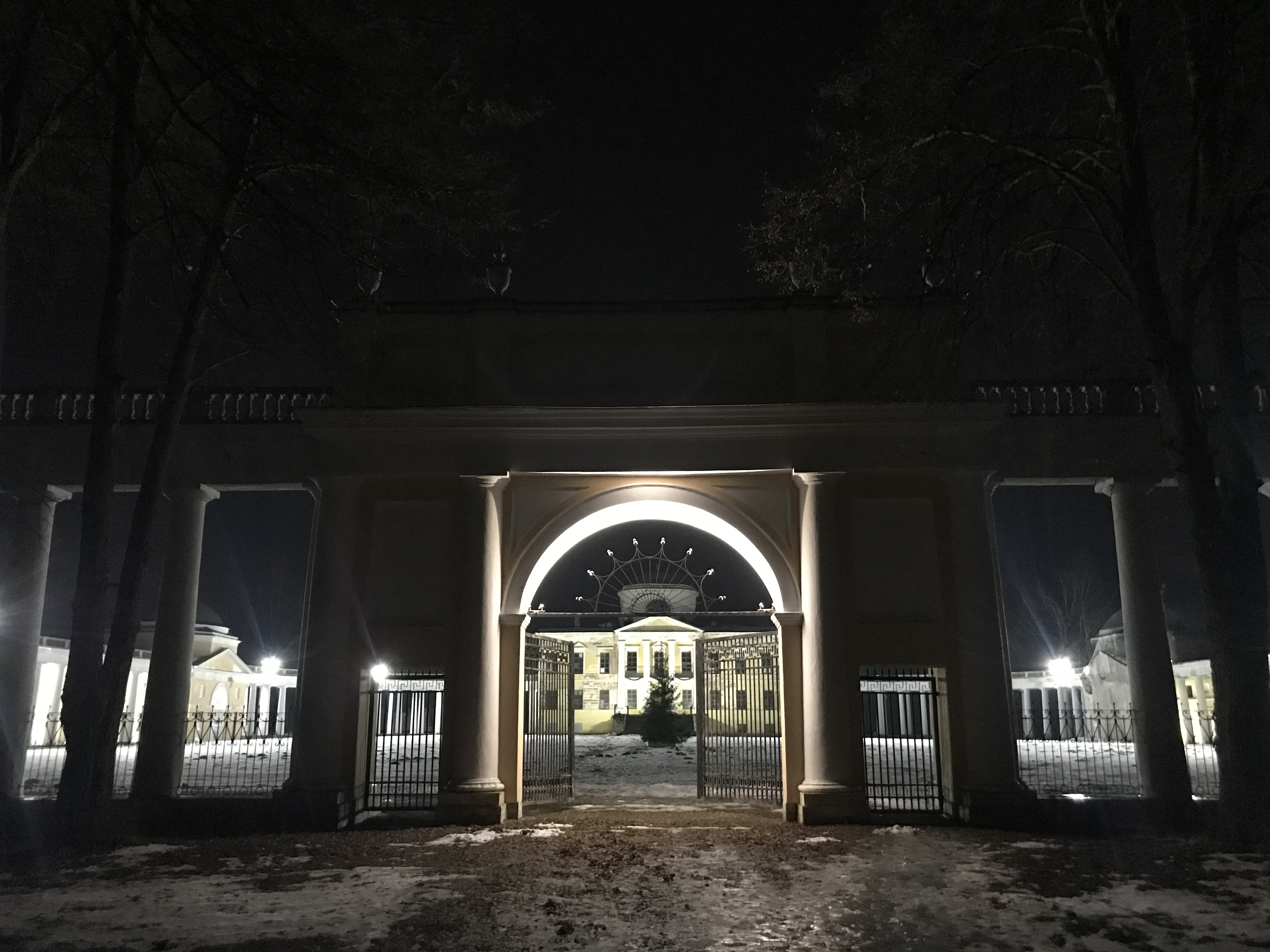
View of the front gate

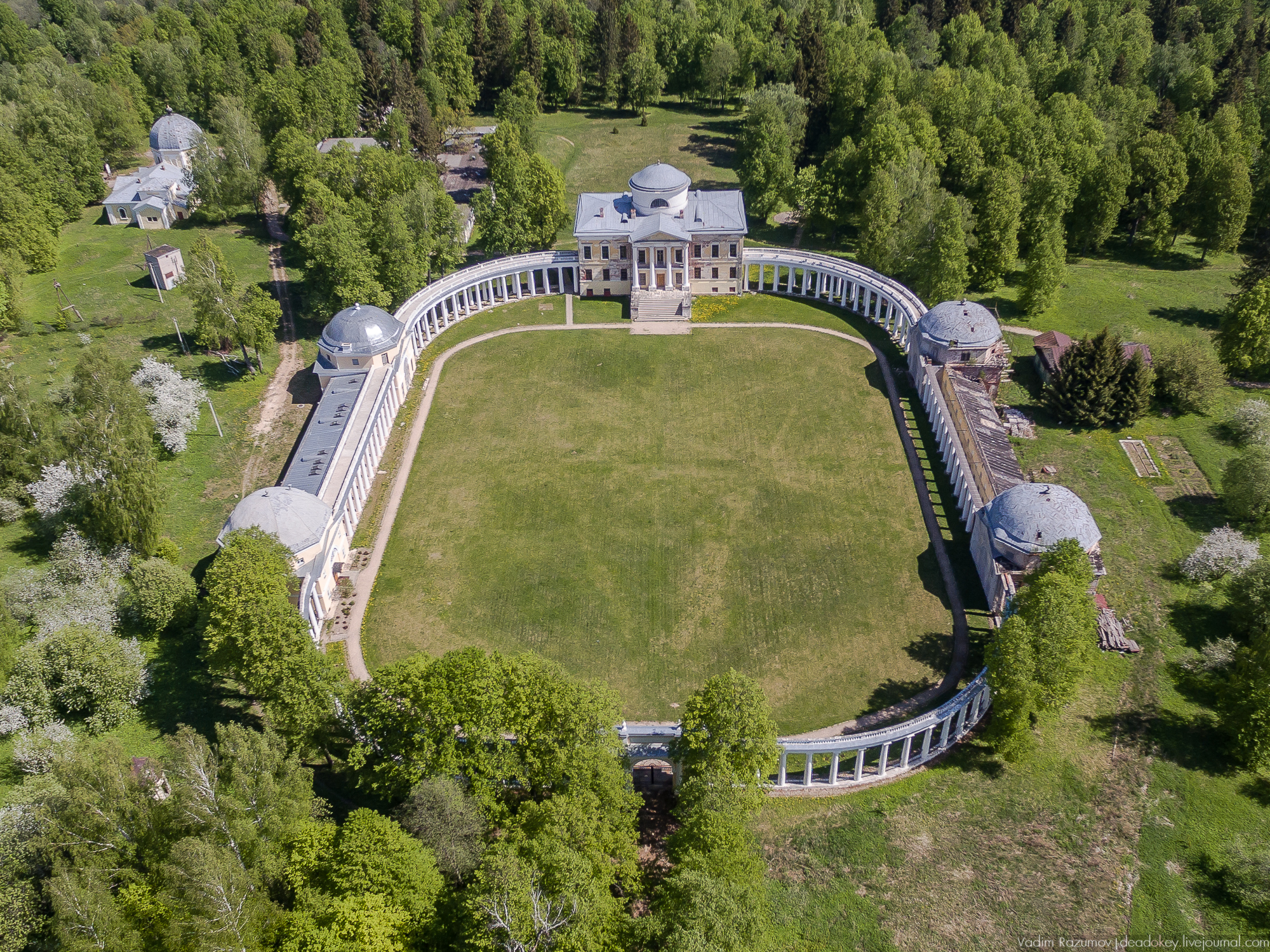
Bird's eye view of the estate

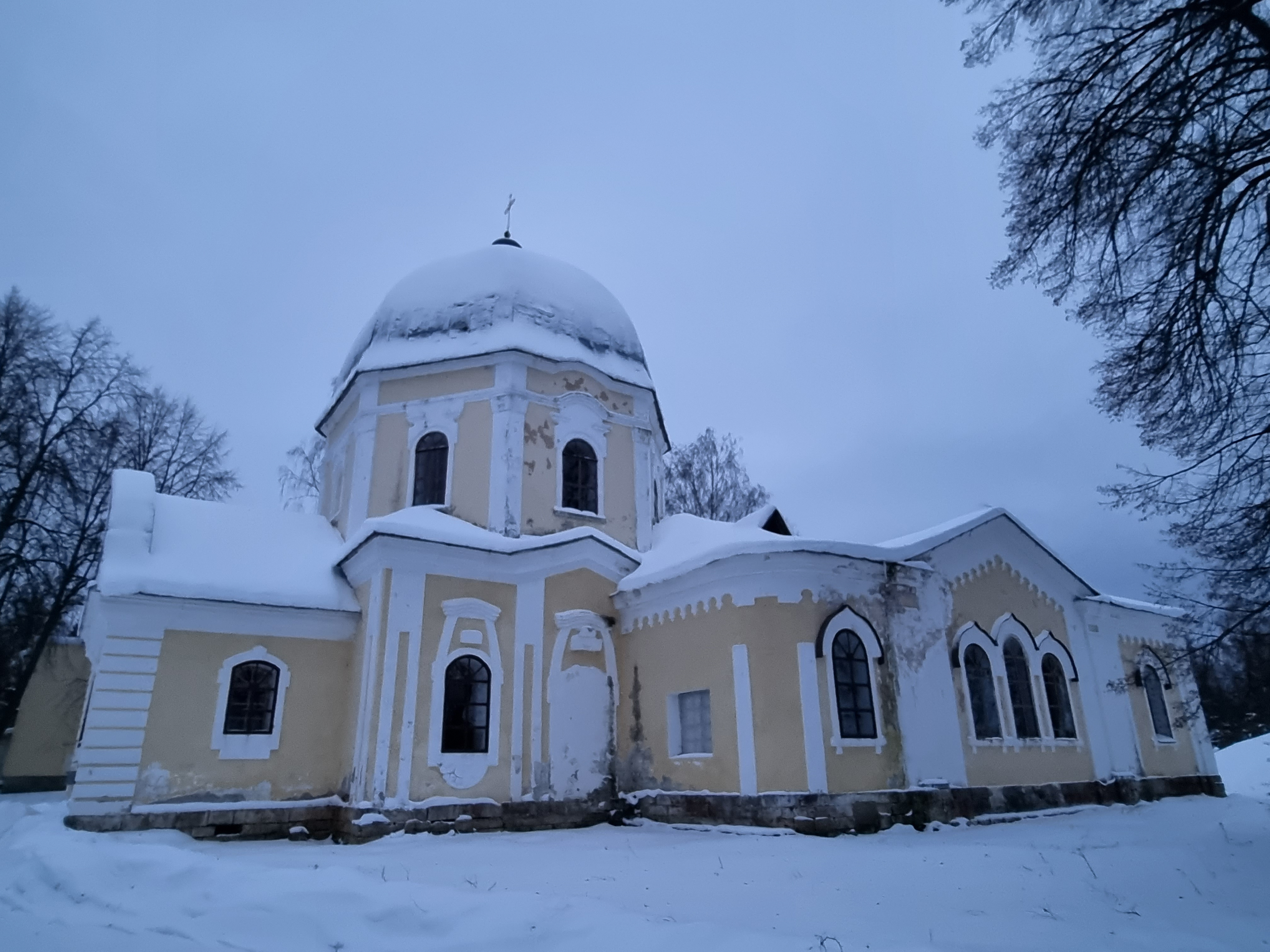
Church at the Znamenskoye-Rayok Estate

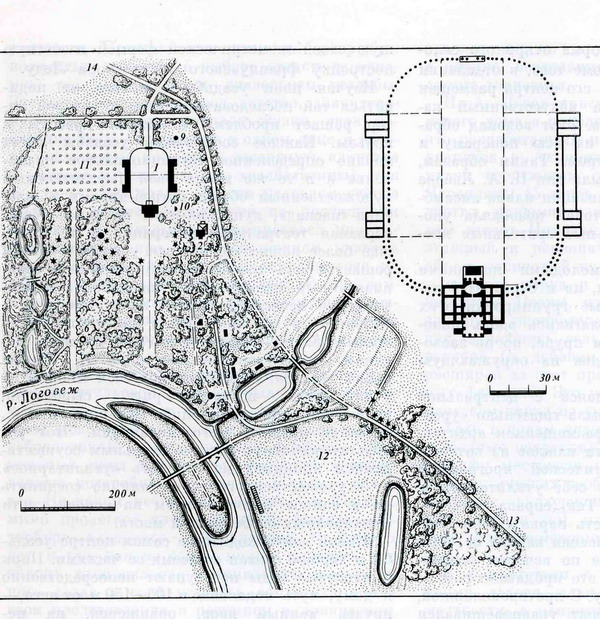
Plan of the estate and park in 1787

The architect Nikolay Lvov, was commissioned by the Glebov-Stershenev to build the estate, which was constructed between 1787–1798 К. Butsi, А.Trofimov, V. Irwin, and F. Ruska worked on the design and construction of the estate.

The architectural ensemble of the estate includes the manor's house and an oval-shaped colonnade connected to the side wings and a double dome above the central hall. the facade on the park side aligns with the river; the park includes a pond with a man-made island and pathways. Most of the pavilions and gazebos from the manor park have been lost.

The heart of the estate is the Church of Our Lady of the Sign, built by Ivan Glebov. Before the revolution of 1917, the church housed the family icons of the Glebov Family which included a Saint Nicholas icon and an Our Lady of the Sign icon, as well as several icons made by Vladimir Borovikovsky. At the moment, the church is open to the public.

Since 2017, part of the manor buildings of the palace and park complex have been owned by "Ray Holding LLC," which has implemented a program to develop a rural settlement into a resort complex, which has historically been directly part of the estate. Currently, a one-story building is being renovated; this is the future business center of Ray Holding.

Since 2022, the management of the estate has been carried out by the Federal State Budgetary Institution of Culture "All-Russian Historical and Ethnographic Museum."
