= Fyodor Glebov =

Fyodor Ivanovich Glebov
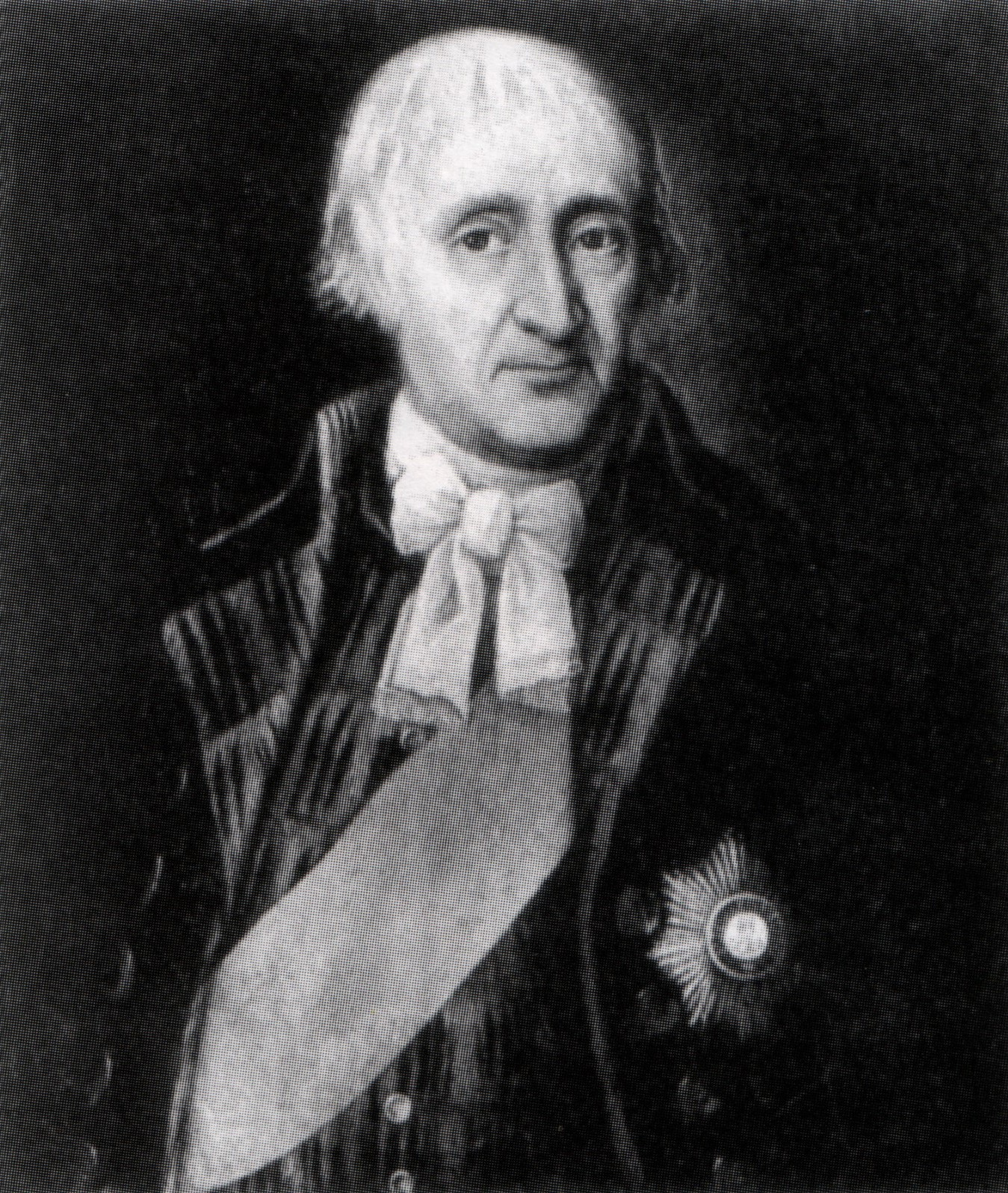

Personal details
- Born: December 31, 1734
- Died: November 29, 1799 (aged 64)
- Resting place: Donskoy Monastery, Moscow
- Spouse(s): 1) Alexandra Ivanovna Dashkova; 2) Yelizaveta Petrovna Streshneva
- Children: from first marriage: Aleksandra from second marriage: Pyotr and Dmitry
- Parents: Ivan Fyodorovich Glebov (father); Praskovya Ivanovna Glebova (mother)
- Awards: Order of Saint Alexander Nevsky, Order of Saint Anna, Order of the White Eagle (Poland), Order of St. Stanislaus (Poland)

Military service
- Rank: Major-General (1764), lieutenant general (1773), general-in-chief (1782)
- Battles/wars: Seven Years' War (1756—1763); Russo-Turkish War (1768–1774)

Fyodor Ivanovich Glebov (Russian: Фёдор Ива́нович Гле́бов, 31 December 1734 – 29 November 1799) was a general-in-chief under Catherine the Great in 1782, a senator in 1781, and he built the Znamenskoye-Rayok Estate. He was one of the highest-ranking and richest members of the Glebov family.

== Biography ==
Fyodor Glebov was born to General-in-Chief Ivan Glebov and his wife Praskovya Ivanovna. He was the second of the four Glebov brothers.

On January 1, 1742, as a 7-year-old boy, he was recorded by his father as a Gotlander in the artillery. On June 20, 1747, he was promoted from master-at-arms to sergeant. On April 21, 1750, Glebov was promoted in the artillery.

In 1751, Fyodor Glebov was transferred as an engineering officer to New Serbia, where, while under the command of his father, he took part in the construction of a fortress in Kropyvnytskyi.

On April 25, 1753, Glebov was promoted to podporuchik. On December 25, 1755, he was promoted again under Count Shuvalov. On January 1, 1757, he was promoted to the rank of captain.

During the Seven Years' War in June 1757, Glebov was sent abroad to the French army, which was in Westphalia under the command of Marshal Louis Le Tellier. On January 1, 1758, he was promoted to the rank of major. In February of the same year he returned to Russia. On August 14, 1758, he participated in the Battle of Zorndorf. On January 1, 1759, he was promoted to podpolkovnik in the artillery after his actions in the battle. In 1760, he served in the corps under Major General Count Gottlob von Tottleben and participated in the Raid on Berlin. In 1761, Glebov was in the corps of Lieutenant General Count Zakhar Chernyshev under the command of the Austrian Feldzeugmeister Baron Ernest von Laudon, and he participated in the capture of Swidnica.

On February 15, 1762, Glebov was promoted to colonel of artillery, and on November 14, 1763, he became a Brigadier of the army and commander of the Nizhny Novgorod Carabinieri regiment. On November 24, 1764, he received the rank of major general. From 1765 to 1767, he served in the Moscow division.

In 1769, Glebov took part in the Russo-Turkish War. He served in the first Russian army under the command of general-in-chief Prince Alexander Golitsyn and he participated in the Siege of Khotyn. Glebov, who was the head of the Vyatka and Moscow Carabinieri regiments, was left near Khotyn and stayed there until the retreat of the Russian army. He was sent with a brigade to repel Abaza Pasha, who attacked a Russian Army convoy, where Glebov defeated him and pursued him to the Prut River.

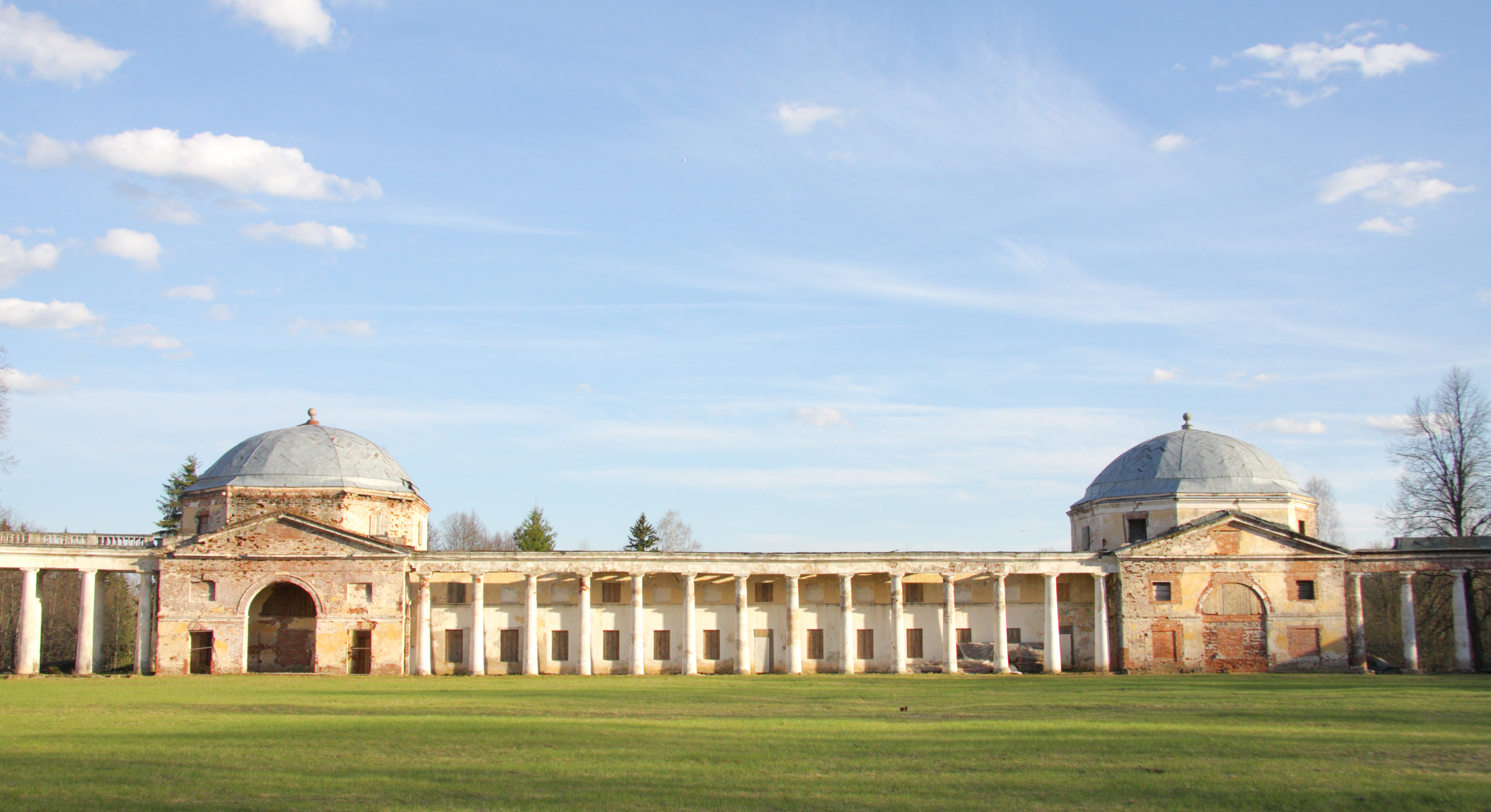
Photo of Glebov's Znamenskoye Rayok estate. The architect was Nikolay Lvov.

On July 2, 1769, Major General Glebov was again near Khotyn, and on August 29 of the same year, commanding five cavalry regiments, he participated in the defeat of the Turkish army led by Grand Vizier Ali Moldavanji Pasha. He was awarded the Order of Saint Anna after the victory. In 1770, under the command of Count Pyotr Rumyantsev, he commanded four infantry regiments and helped maintain communication with Russian troops in Podolia. On July 21, 1770, he participated in the defeat of the Turkish-Tatar army in the Battle of Kagul.

On August 10, 1770, Glebov came under the command of Lieutenant-General Count Yakov Bruce. In September of the same year, field marshal Rumyantsev ordered Glebov's corps (8 regiments of infantry, 3 regiments of hussars and 1 regiment of carabinieri) to take the city of Braila. On September 26, he laid siege to the city, repelling the frequent attacks of the Turks. On the night of October 24, Glebov moved to attack, but failed, and around 500 soldiers were killed and more than 1300 were wounded. The approaching Turkish corps forced Glebov to end the siege and retreat on the Seret River. Having received reinforcements from Rumyantsev, Glebov laid siege to Braila for the second time. The Turks, fearing a new siege, left their position and retreated across the Danube. On November 10, 1770, Russian troops entered Braila.

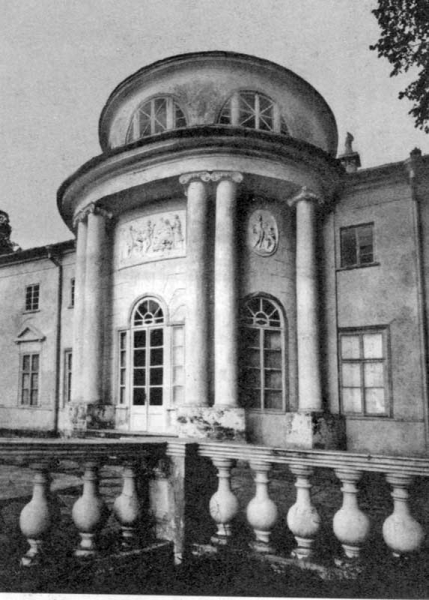
Pokrovskoye-Streshnevo Estate near Moscow

On April 21, 1773, Glebov was promoted to lieutenant general. In June 1773, while commanding the cavalry of the 1st division with Field Marshal Rumyantsev, Glebov participated in the siege of Silistra.

In 1775, Glebov commanded the Russian troops stationed in Poland, and received the Order of the White Eagle and Order of Saint Stanislaus from Stanisław Poniatowski. Then he served in the Finnish division, and in 1777 he commanded a division in Tallinn.

On July 28, 1781, Glebov was appointed senator (since August 4, 1781, he was present in the 3rd department of the Senate, and from December 4, 1782, in the 2nd department).

On July 28, 1782, Glebov was promoted to General-in-Chief, and on November 24 of the same year he was awarded the Order of Saint Alexander Nevsky.

On March 18, 1791, Glebov resigned from the Senate due to illness for 2 years with salary, and on May 2, 1793, his leave was extended until January 1, 1794. On August 7, 1794, at his own request, Glebov was dismissed from the service while retaining his salary

On November 29, 1799, Fyodor Ivanovich Glebov died. He was buried in the Donskoy Monastery. The poet Ivan Dolgorukov dedicated two poems to Glebov's memory: “On the death of F.I. Glebov” and “Tombstone,” lines from which, at the request of the widow, were engraved on the tombstone. The inscriptions have not been preserved.

Gustav von Strandmann, who served under the command of Glebov in Tallinn, in his "Notes" gives the following description of Glebov:

He is one of the most good-natured people that I have ever seen. He and his wife were very courteous with subordinates, and both enjoyed great respect in Tallinn, for both their friendliness and their politeness, and especially for the fact that they lived opulently and received guests every day. He was terribly fond of playing cards.

== Family and children ==
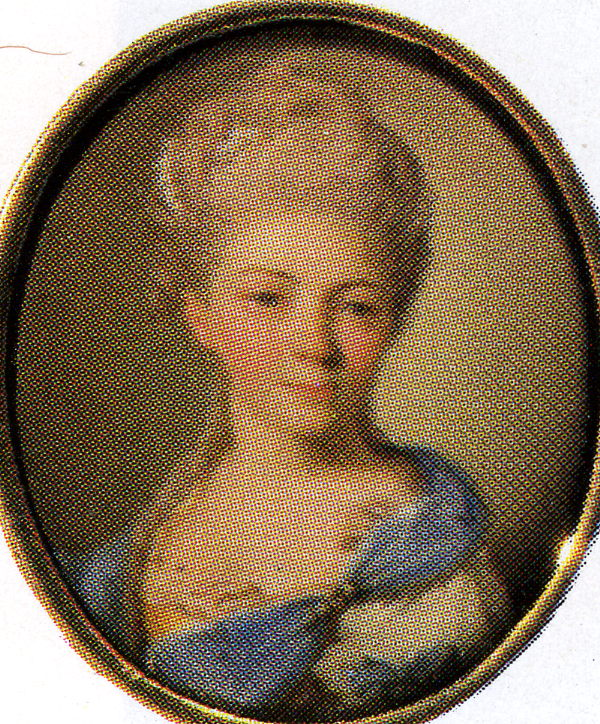
Yelizaveta Petrovna Glebova-Streshneva

In 1765, he married Aleksandra Ivanovna Dashkova (1738–1769), the sister of Mikhail Dashkov, and the granddaughter of General-in-Chief Mikhail Leontiev. The couple had one daughter:

- Aleksandra (1766–1796), who was the wife (since April 16, 1787) of Major General Dmitry Mikhailovich Shcherbatov (1760–1839), who was the son of the historiographer and pamphleteer M. M. Shcherbatov. They were married in St. Petersburg in Saint Isaac's Cathedral. Baron Stroganov tried marry Alexandra to his nephew I. M. Dolgorukov, but Dolgorukov evaded the marriage because he found “something evil” in Alexandra's face.

Three years after the death of his first wife, he married his second wife, Yelizaveta Glebova-Streshneva (1751–1837), the heiress of the Pokrovskoye-Streshnevo Estate near Moscow and other Streshnev family estates. General Glebov built a manor house near Pokrovsky Park, for his new wife, and he named in her honor. They had four children in their marriage, but two of them (a son and daughter) died in infancy.

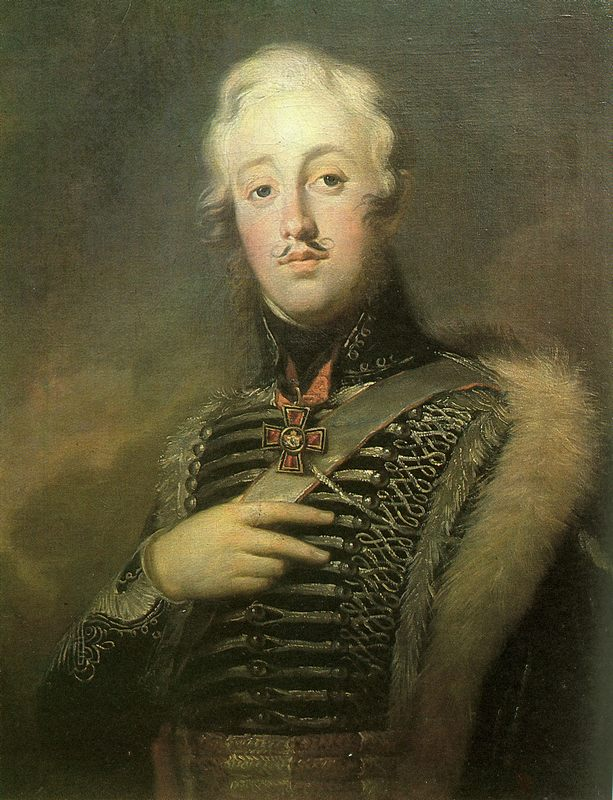
Pyotr Fyodorovich Glebov-Streshnev

- Pyotr Fydorovich Glebov-Streshnev (1773–1807), major general, chief of the Olviopol Hussar Regiment, died of battle wounds. He was married to Anna Vasilievna Drutskaya-Sokolinskaya, the daughter of a colonel.
- Ivan Glebov-Streshnev (1779–?), was baptized in St. Isaac's Cathedral.
- Dmitry Glebov-Streshnev (1782–1816) was a valet de chambre, and he died unmarried. His mother never allowed him to marry or serve. He lived in a wing of the Helikon Opera and often pretended to be sick, so as not to see his mother and not be subjected to her discipline.

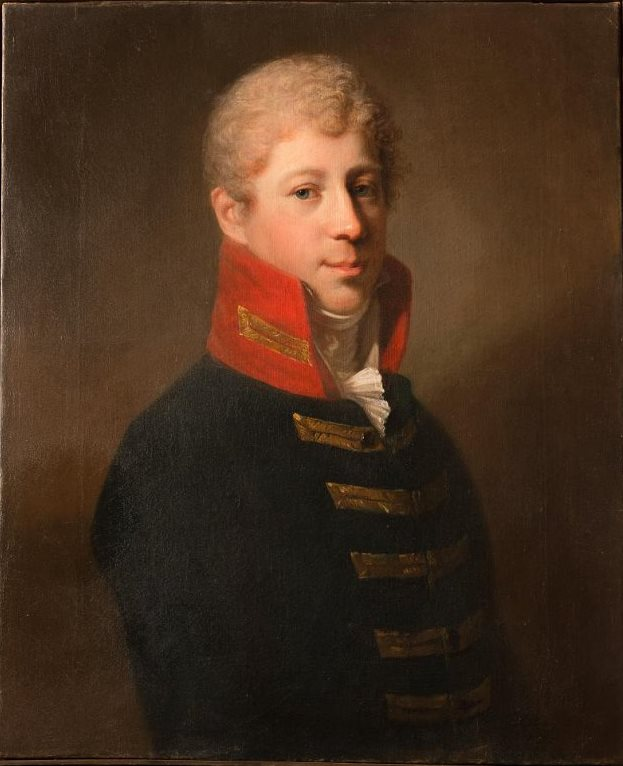
Dmitry Fyodorovich Glebov-Streshnev
