= Tomasz Tomaszewski =

- Born: Czechowice, Poland
- Occupation: Musician
- Musical career
- Genres: Classical
- Instrument: Violin

Tomasz Tomaszewski, PM (Polish: [ˈtɔmaʂ tɔmaˈʂɛfskʲi]) is a Polish violinist and the first concertmaster in Deutsche Oper Berlin. Born in Czechowice, Poland. He studied at the Warsaw Academy of Music, then the Leningrad Conservatory and later in Freiburg, he also attended master classes with Fyodor Druzhinin, Oleh Krysa, Pierre Fournier, Liebermann, Hiller and Szerny. He is a professor on Berlin University of the Arts. He plays in Kwartet Polski quartet ensemble. He performed on festivals like Silesian Festival of Ludwig van Beethoven and New Year NFM Festival. He also played on Kraków Poetry Salon.
