= Yevgenia Shakhovskaya-Glebova-Streshneva =

Yevgenia Fyodorovna Shakhovskaya-Glebova-Streshneva
- Евгения Фёдоровна Шаховская-Глебова-Стрешнева
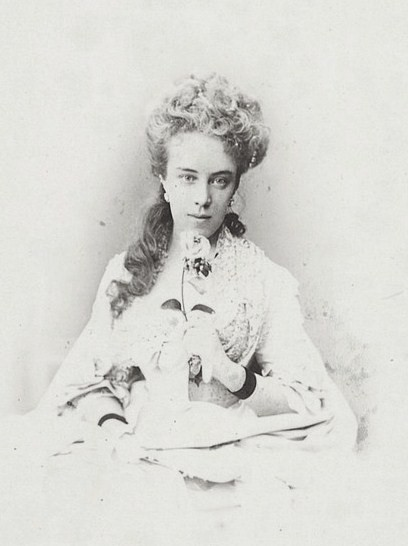
- Born: December 24, 1840
- Died: November 12, 1924 (83 years old); Paris
- Spouse: Mikhail Valentinovich Shakhovsky-Glebov-Streshnev
- Awards: Order of Theresa and Order of Saint Catherine

Princess Yevgenia Fyodorovna Shakhovskaya-Glebova-Streshneva (Russian: Евге́ния Фёдоровна Шаховска́я-Гле́бова-Стре́шнева, née von Brevern; 24 December 1840 — 12 November 1924) was a Russian philanthropist and Cavalry Lady of the Bavarian Order of Theresa (1869) and the Order of Saint Catherine (1913). She was the last member of the Glebov-Streshnev noble family.

== Biography ==
She was descended from the noble Brevern family. She was the daughter of the impoverished Major General Fyodor (Friedrich) Logginovich von Brevern from his marriage with Natalya Petrovna Glebova-Streshneva, who was the daughter of Pyotr Fyodorovich Glebov-Streshnev. Both Yevgeniya and her sister Varvara (1843— ?) were raised at home. She was a rich heiress: in addition to half of her mother's estate, in 1864 she inherited the entire Streshnev estate from her childless uncle Fyodor Petrovich Glebov-Streshnev.

In 1862 she married Mikhail Valentinovich Shakhovsky. In 1864, according to the imperial rescript, Yevgenia's childless uncle's surname was transferred to her and her husband. As a result, they started having a triple surname. The couple was very wealthy and owned homes in Moscow, as well as in the Moscow region and on the French Riviera in France.

Because the couple had no children of their own and a large amount of money, they frequently gave to charity. They donated funds to summer children's colonies, infirmaries and old age homes. They also were members of the board for an orphanage. Yevgenia was a member of the Moscow Zemstvo Committee for Prisons, a trustee for the Alexander Asylum, and a patron of art and theater. As a governor's wife, she participated in the creation of the Estonian Ladies' Committee (1872) and the Tambov Provincial Ladies' Committee (1877).

She is also the author of a number of biographical and historical publications in French and German.

Yevgenia created the first rural shelter for girls with poor health, near her estate (Pokrovskoye-Streshnevo Estate) in Moscow. Under Yevgenia Fyodorovna, the family estate was improved. Yevgenia also renovated the Shakhovsky-Glebov-Streshnev Estate on Bolshaya Nikitskaya Street, which now houses the Helikon Opera. Currently, a portrait of Yevgenia hangs in the Helikon Opera, however, according to new research, it may not be authentic.

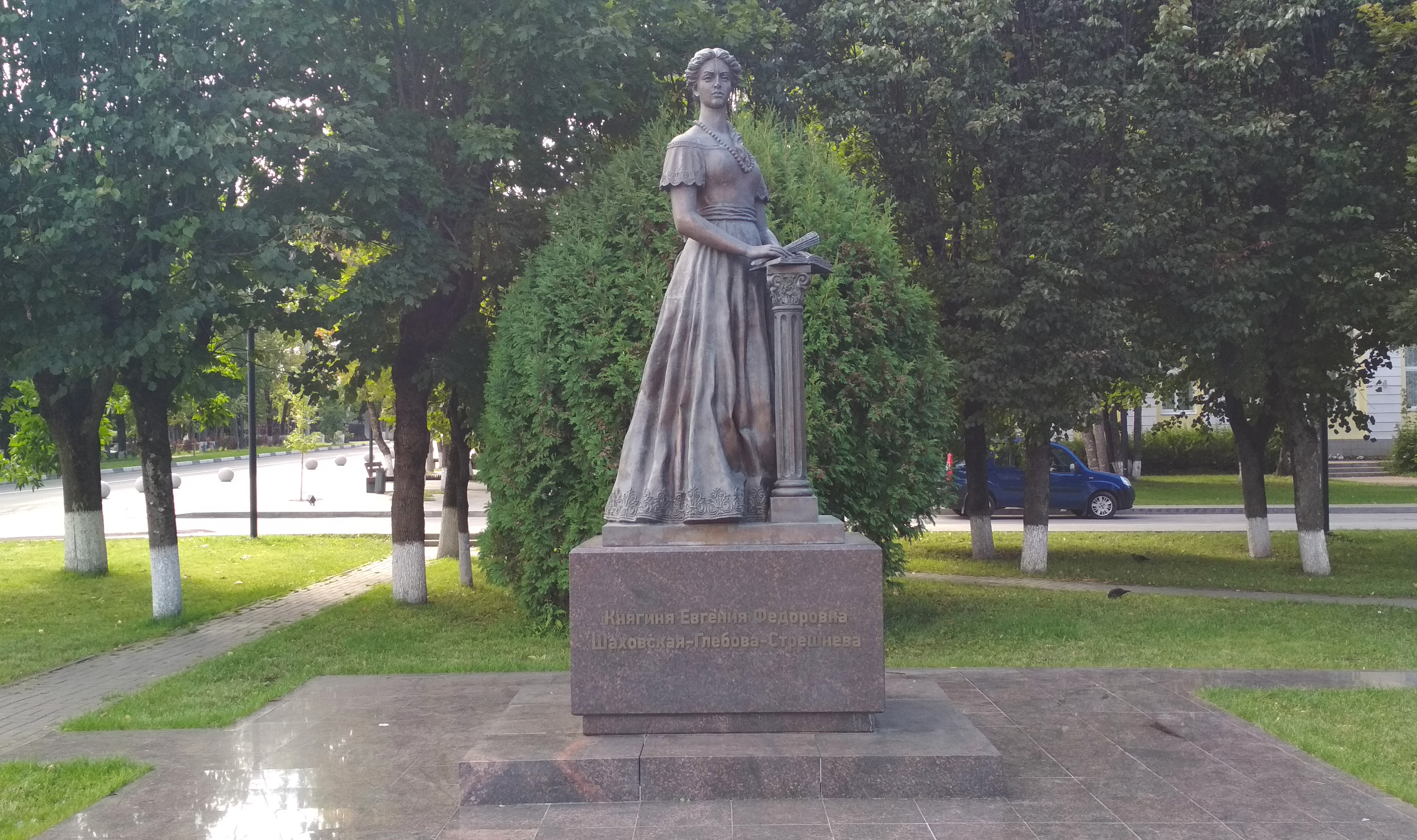
Monument to E. F. Shakhovskaya-Glebova-Streshneva in Shakhovskaya

The village of Shakhovskaya, founded in 1901 in connection with the construction of the Moscow-Vindava railway was named in honor of Yevgenia. In 2017, a monument was built in her honor in the village.

During the Russo-Japanese War, Yevgenia gave up one of her palaces to be a hospital.

In November 1918, Yevgenia's property was nationalized. On October 29, 1919, at 78 years old, she was arrested and spent two and a half years in prison. After 1922, she traveled abroad, settling in Paris. She died on November 12, 1924, and was buried in the Batignolles Cemetery. She bequeathed her fortune, which she still had from real estate abroad, to a fund for helping talented children of Russian heritage.

== Links ==
- "The story of Princess Shakhovskaya, to whom Russia and France are grateful". Вести.ру. 2019-05-26. Archived from the original on 2021-05-05.
- "Princess Evgenia Fyodorovna and Prince Mikhail Valentinovich Shakhovsky-Glebov-Streshnev". «Шаховской районный историко-краеведческий музей». Archived from the original on 2021-05-05.
