= Smolny Institute of Noble Maidens =

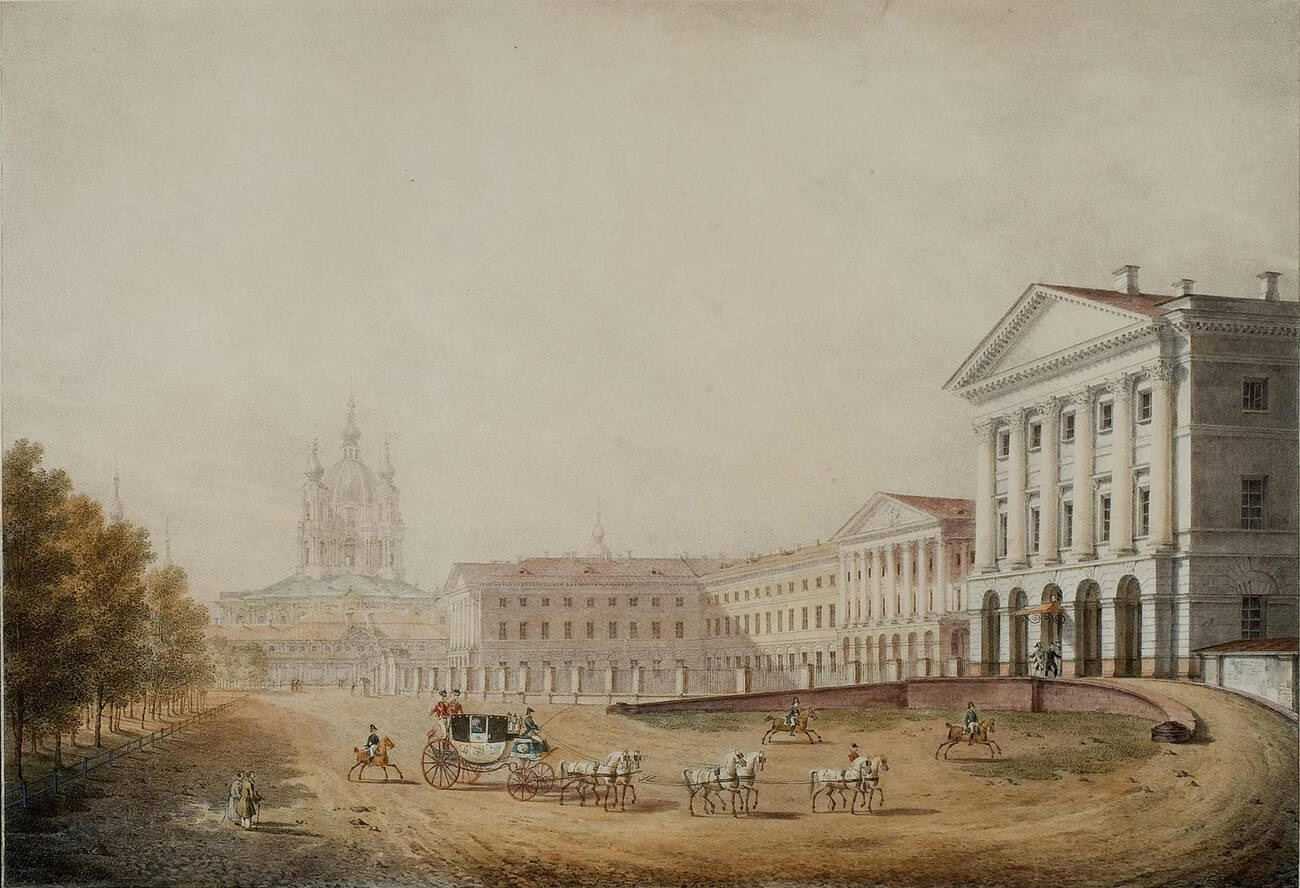
- The Smolny Institute in 1823, by Stepan Galaktionov

Location
- Saint Petersburg; 59.9486°N 30.395°E

Information
- Former name: Imperial Educational Society of Noble Maidens
- Established: 5 May 1764 (Julian calendar)
- Closed: 1919 (Russia); 1932 (exile in Serbia)

The Smolny Institute of Noble Maidens of Saint Petersburg (Russian: Смольный институт благородных девиц Санкт-Петербурга) was the first women's educational institution in Russia that laid the foundation for women's education in the country. It was Europe's first public educational institution for girls.

== History ==
=== Institute under Catherine the Second ===
It was originally called the Imperial Educational Society of Noble Maidens. It was founded on the initiative of Ivan Betskoy and in accordance with a decree signed by Catherine the Great on May 16, 1764. This society, as stated in the decree, was created in order to "give the state educated women, good mothers, useful members of the family and society". The name Smolny comes from the Smolny Palace, built in 1729 by Peter the Great near the village of Smolny, in which there was a tar factory.

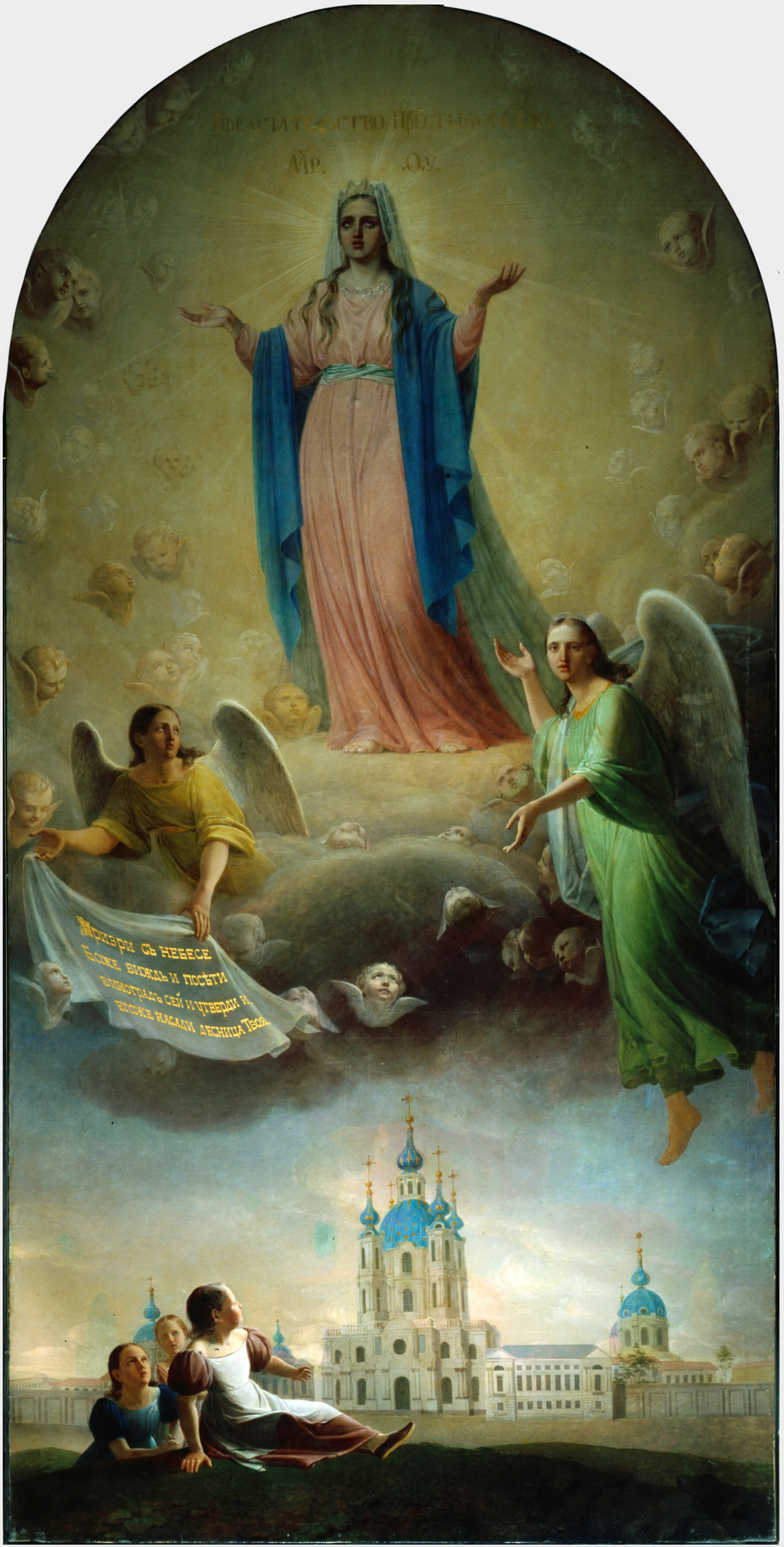
Picture by Alexey Venetsianov "The Intercession of the Mother of God for the Pupils of the Smolny Institute". Between 1832 and 1835

Catherine, an admirer of the progressive ideas of Montaigne, Locke, and Fénelon, wanted to establish an educational institution similar to the Saint–Cyr Institute near Paris. According to its charter, girls were supposed to enter an institution no older than six years of age and stay there for twelve years, and a receipt was taken from their parents that they would not demand them back under any pretext before the expiration of this period. The Empress hoped, by removing children for a long time from an ignorant environment and returning an already developed and ennobled girl there, to help soften morals and create a "new breed of people". The Senate was ordered to print and send the charter of this institution to all the provinces, provinces and cities, "so that each of the nobles could, if he so wishes, entrust his daughters with this established upbringing". The decree provided for the education of two hundred noble maidens in the newly built Novodevichy Convent.

The institute was originally established as a closed privileged educational institution for the daughters of the nobility. A year later, in 1765, a department was opened for "bourgeois" maidens (meaning non-noble, but not serfs). The building for the Meshchansky school was erected by the architect Yury Felten.

=== Further history ===
In 1796, the institute entered the Office of the Institutions of Empress Maria. In 1806, the Smolny Institute was built for the school. This accepted daughters of the hereditary Russian nobility and also of persons no lower in rank than a colonel or a Real State Adviser to the treasury bill. For an annual fee, it prepared them for court and social life.

In 1848, a two-year pedagogical class was opened at the institute for the training of schoolteachers, and the "philistine" department was transformed into the St. Petersburg Alexander School, which in 1891 became the Alexander Institute.

From 1859 to 1862, the class inspector of the institute was Konstantin Ushinsky, who carried out a number of progressive reforms, establishing a new seven-year curriculum with a large number of hours devoted to Russian language and literature, geography, history, natural sciences, etc.. After Ushinsky's forced departure from the institute, all of his major reforms were reversed.

=== After 1917 ===
In October 1917, as a result of the October Revolution, the institute, then headed by Princess Vera Golitsyna, moved to Novocherkassk, the centre of the Don Army counter-revolution.

The last Russian release took place in February 1919 in Novocherkassk. In the summer of 1919, with the Russian Civil War intensifying, the institute left Russia and was re-established in Serbia, where it would continue to teach the daughters of white emigres until 1932.

The vacated building of the Smolny Institute was taken up by Lenin as the headquarters of the victorious Bolshevik Party, and as such featured prominently in annals of the October Revolution.

== Study at the institute ==
Initially, the pupils were divided into four ages: from 6 to 9 years, from 9 to 12 years, from 12 to 15 years, from 15 to 18 years. The institution sewed special uniform dresses of a certain color for all the pupils of the institute: at a young age – coffee, in the second – dark blue, in the third – blue and at an older age – white. Brown color symbolized proximity to the earth and was practical, especially for younger children. Lighter colors symbolized increasing education and accuracy. Parents or relatives who assigned the girl to the institute should have given "a written commitment that they, prior to the expiration of the period set for education, will not demand her back under any circumstances".

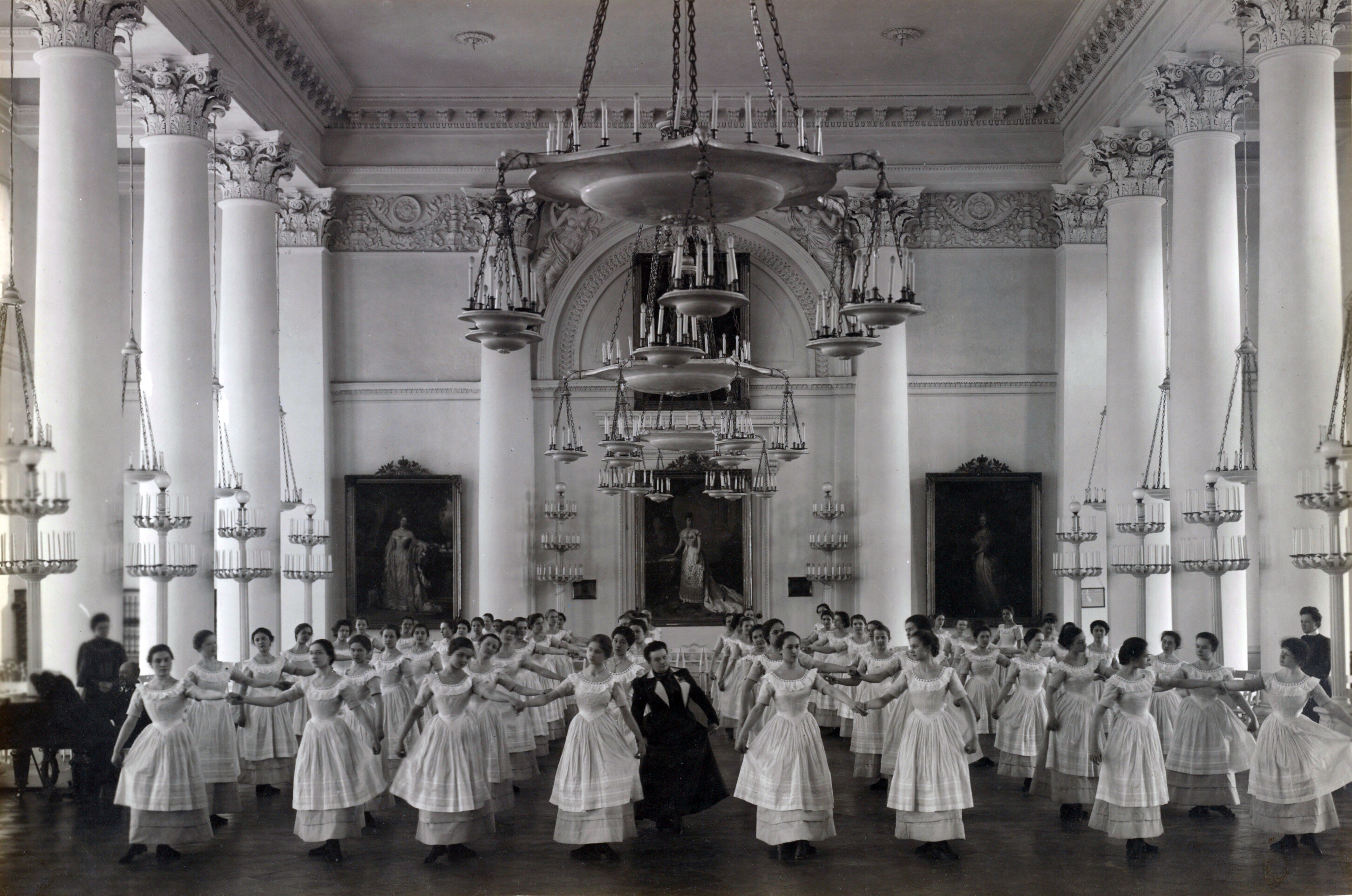
Pupils of the Smolny Institute of Noble Maidens at a dance lesson (1889)

During the training, special attention was paid to the Law of God and languages (domestic and foreign). The program also included teaching Russian literature, geography, arithmetic, history, music, dancing, drawing, secular manners, various types of economics. The main attention was paid to moral education.

Later, the training period was reduced to 9 years; Empress Maria Fyodorovna believed that "children, for such a long time, are weaned from their parents so that, at the end of the course, they return home with disgust" and in 1797 the youngest age was eliminated; now the pupils were divided into three ages: "blue", "gray" and "white" (senior); in the "philistine branch" began to accept from 10 years.

At the final public exam of students of Smolny, the emperor and his family were usually present. The first graduation from the Institute of Noble Maidens, as well as the philistine school, took place on May 11, 1776. At the end of the institute, the best graduates received a "code" – a gold monogram in the form of the initial of Empress Catherine II, worn on a white bow with gold stripes; in the first issue, the "cipher" was received by the eight best pupils: Alymova, Molchanova (pictured), Rubanovskaya, Levshina, Borshchova, Eropkina, von Valshtein and Nelidova. Subsequently, the cipher was received by 6 to 10 of the best pupils.

According to the head of the scientific and exposition department of the Smolny State Museum, Olga Fedorova, the institutes were happy to break free, of which they had long dreamed; one of the institutes in her recordings on the album recalled, "how they and Zina "fried" on the piano four hands".

Some students of the institute became maids of honor of the court.

The training course of the institute was equated to the course of girls' high schools.

== Notable alumni ==
- Anna Matyushkina (1722–1804), maid of honour to Empress Elizabeth of Russia.
- Yekaterina Nelidova (1756–1839), mistress of Emperor Paul I of Russia. She was also a lady-in-waiting of his wife, Natalia Alexeievna.
- Natalya Borshchova (1758–1843), lady-in-waiting of Natalia Alexeievna, and later of Maria Feodorovna.
- Glafira Alymova (1758–1826), harpist and lady-in-waiting of Catherine the Great.
- Euphrosinia Kolyupanovskaya (1758–1855), Orthodox ascetic, and lady-in-waiting of Catherine the Great
- Yelizaveta Palmenbach (1761–1832), pedagogue. She later became head of the institute from 1797 to 1802.
- Maria Alexeievna Naryshkina (1762–1822), maid of honour to Catherine the Great.
- Varvara Golovina (1766–1821), artist and close confidant of Empress Elizabeth Alexeievna.
- Maria Leontieva (1792–1872), maid of honour of Grand Duchess Maria Nikolaevna of Russia, Duchess of Leuchtenberg. She later became head of the institute from 1839 to 1875.
- Ekaterina Adlerberg (1821–1910), maid of honour of Grand Duchess Maria Nikolaevna of Russia, Duchess of Leuchtenberg.
- Olga Tomilova (1822–1894), pedagogue. In 1875, she became the head of the institute, and she'd hold that position for eleven years.
- Olga Skobeleva (1823–1880), philanthropist and hospital organizer.
- Daria Tyutcheva (1834–1903), daughter of the poet Fyodor Tyutchev.
- Ekaterina Tyutcheva (1835–1882), daughter of the poet Fyodor Tyutchev, and maid of honour of Empress Maria Alexandrovna.
- Catherine Dolgorukova (1847–1922), morganatic wife of Emperor Alexander II of Russia.
- Alexandra Ahnger (1859–1940), singer and voice teacher.
- Princess Zorka of Montenegro (1864–1890), daughter of King Nicholas I of Montenegro, and wife of King Peter I of Serbia.
- Princess Milica of Montenegro (1866–1951), daughter of King Nicholas I of Montenegro, and wife of Grand Duke Peter Nikolaevich of Russia.
- Vera Yevstafievna Popova (1867–1896), a famed chemist.
- Princess Anastasia of Montenegro (1868–1935), daughter of King Nicholas I of Montenegro, and wife of Grand Duke Nicholas Nikolaevich of Russia.
- Sofia Panina (1871–1956), Minister in the Provisional Government.
- Princess Elena of Montenegro (1873–1952), daughter of King Nicholas I of Montenegro, and Queen consort of Italy, Empress consort of Ethiopia.
- Princess Anna of Montenegro (1874–1971), daughter of King Nicholas I of Montenegro, and wife of Prince Francis Joseph of Battenberg.
- Princess Helen of Serbia (1884–1962), daughter of Princess Zorka and King Peter I of Serbia, and wife of Prince John Konstantinovich of Russia.
- Alexandra Tegleva (1884–1955), nursemaid in the Imperial Russian household.
- Moura Budberg (1893–1974), translator and suspected double agent of the Soviet Union's Joint State Political Directorate (OGPU) and British intelligence agencies.
- Marija Zacharczenko-Szulc (1893–1927), political figure of the White Movement, who was killed by the OGPU.
- Baroness Olga von Root (1901–1967), singer and stage actress.

== Heads of the Institute ==
1. Anna Sergeyevna Dolgorukaya (1719-1778), official head from 1764 to 1766. However, she left the actual leadership to her subordinate, Sophie de Lafont.
2. Sophie de Lafont (1717–1797), from 1764 to 1797.
3. Yelizaveta Palmenbach (1761–1832), former student. Head of the Institue from 1797 to 1802.
4. Julia Adlerberg (1760–1839), former governess of Nicholas I of Russia. Head of the Institute from 1802 to 1839.
5. Maria Leontieva (1792–1872), former student. Head of the Institute from 1839 to 1875.
6. Olga Tomilova (1822–1894), former student. Head of the Institute from 1875 to 1886.
7. Maria Novosiltseva (1830–1910), Head of the Institute from 1886 to 1895.
8. Jelena Lieven (1842–1915), Head of the Institute from 1895 until her death in 1915.
9. Vera Golitsyna (1854–1920), Head of the Institute from 1915 until 1919, when the last graduation ceremony was held in Russia.

Out of the nine headmistresses, three had been students themselves. Maria Leontieva held the record for longest-serving headmistress, holding the position for thirty-six years.

== See also ==
- Institutes of Noble Maidens in the Russian Empire
- Finishing school

== Sources ==
- Vasily Lyadov. The Historical Outline of the Centennial Life of the Educational Society of Noble Maidens and the Saint Petersburg Alexander School.
- Elena Likhacheva. Materials for the History of Female Education in Russia. Volumes 1–4 – Saint Petersburg, 1890–1901
- Varvara Bykova (1898). Notes of an Old Student of Smolny. Part 1. 1833–1878. Saint Petersburg: prlib.ru.
- Maria Uglichaninova. Memoirs of the Pupil of the Smolny Monastery of the Forties – Moscow, 1901
- Zinaida Mordvinova. State Lady Maria Leontyeva – Saint Petersburg, 1902
- Nikolai Cherepnin. The Imperial Educational Society of Noble Maidens. Volume 1–3 – Saint Petersburg–Petrograd, 1914–1915
- Elizaveta Vodovozova (1964). At the Dawn of Life, Volume 1. Moscow.
- Ozerskaya F. S. Female Education // Essays on the History of the School and Pedagogical Thought of the Peoples of the Soviet Union in the 18th and First Half of the 19th Centuries – Moscow, 1973
- Barbara Alpern Engel (2004). Women in Russia, 1700–2000. Cambridge University Press. ISBN 9780521003186. Archived from the original on 2018-04-01.
