= Adlerberg =

Adlerberg may refer to:

- Adlerberg family, Swedish noble family
- Adlerberg group of the Únětice culture, Bronze Age culture
- Sashegy, hill and neighbourhood in Budapest, Hungary, formerly known as Adlerberg
