= List of Principals of the Smolny Institute of Noble Maidens =

The following is a list of those who have been principals of the Smolny Institute of Noble Maidens.

#	Tenure	Portrait	Name	Notes
1	1764		Anna Sergeyevna Dolgorukaya	Dolgorukaya was the first principal of the Institute, with de Lafont as assistant. Within the year, it became apparent she was ill suited to the role. Catherine II showered favours on her in order to persuade her to resign. Dolgorukaya resigned in 1766, due to ill health.
2	1764 - 1797		Sophie de Lafont	In 1764, de Lafont was appointed assistant, becoming principal in 1773, a position which she held for more than thirty years. In 1797, she was awarded the Order of Saint Catherine (small cross).
3	1797 - 1802		Elizaveta Alexandrovna Palmenbach	In 1796, Palmenbach (a former pupil) was appointed assistant to de Lafont. She became principal in August 1797 upon the death of de Lafont. In 1801, she was awarded the Order of Saint Catherine (small cross).
4	1802 - 1839		Yulia Fedorovna Adlerberg	On 12 April 1802, she was appointed as principal. On 27 February 1824, she was made a state lady. On 24 April 1824, she received the Order of Saint Catherine (small cross). On 22 July 1835, she received the Order of Saint Catherine (grand cross).
5	1839 - 1875		Maria Pavlovna Leontyeva	Adlerberg, wanting to prepare a successor, turned to the Empress to appoint an assistant. Leintyeva was chosen, and remained an assistant for one year until the death of Alderberg on 21 September 1839, when she was appointed principal, with a salary of 6,000 rubles. Leontyeva was active in the institution up until the day of her death. On 23 November 1839, she received the Order of Saint Catherine (small cross). On 5 May 1864, she was made a state lady.
6	1875 - 1886		Olga Alexandrovna Tomilova	Leontyeva wanted to prepare a successor, much like she had been herself. She petitioned for the appointment of Tomilova, whom she remembered as one of the brightest students of the class of 1839. On 20 January 1873, Tomilova as approved as an assistant. In 1874, she assumed the position of principal upon the death of her predescesor. In 1874, she was awarded the Order of Saint Catherine (small cross), on the occasion of Grand Duchess Vera Konstantinovna's wedding, who she was a tutor to. She would later resign due a deteriorating eye disease which had been interfering with her work.
7	1886 - 1895		Maria Petrovna Novosiltseva	She was appointed principal by Empress Maria Feodorovna in 1886 following Tomilova's resignation. She did not change anything in the institute on an educational level, but having nursed the injured in the Russo-Turkish War, she paid special attention towards the ill students and improved the medical care at the institute. In 1894 she received the Order of Saint Catherine (small cross). Novosiltseva later resigned due to ill health.
8	1895 - 1917		Elena Alexandrovna Liven	Previously head of the Moscow Nikolaev Orphan Institute, and the Elizbethan Institute, she was appointed principal of the Smolny Institute on 5 January 1895. She raised hygiene and curriculum standards, as well as affording the pupils more freedoms, and encouraging physical activities. In 1909, electricity was installed. Her efforts were greatly appreciated by the imperial family, as such she was made a maid of honour to Empress Alexandra Feodorovna and was awarded the Order of Saint Catherine (small cross) on 19 April 1905.
9	1917 - 1919		Vera Vasilievna Golitsyna	In 1917, the Smolny Institute was chosen by Vladimir Lenin as the Bolshevik headquarters, thus the school under Goltisyna's leadership relocated to Novocherkassk, where the last graduation was held in 1919 before the remaining students and pupils left Russia with the White Army. The Institute reopened in Serbia, before closing for the final time.
