= Vladimir Fyodorovich Adlerberg =

Russian government minister

Vladimir Adlerberg
- Владимир Адлерберг
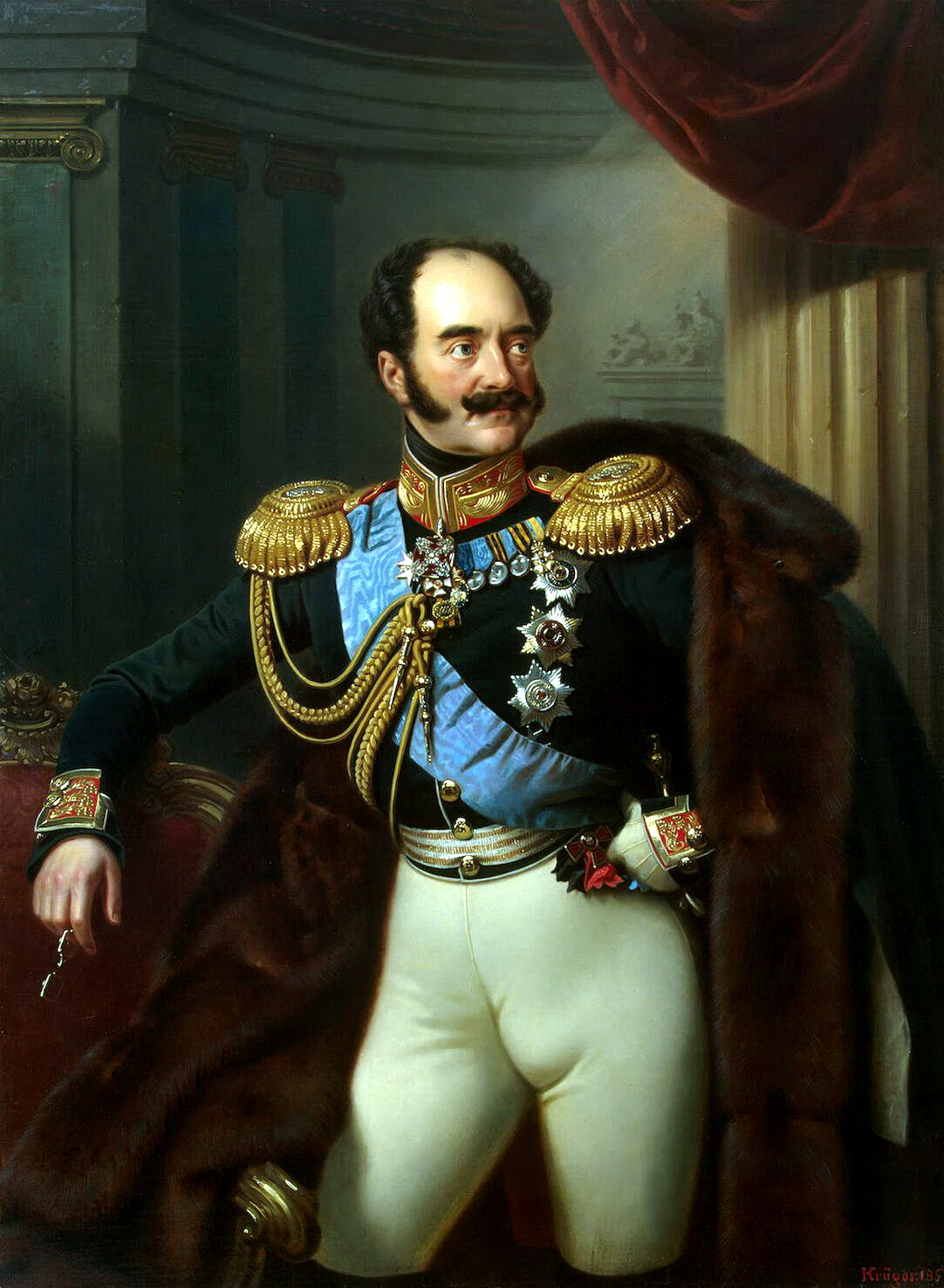
- Born: 21 November 1791; Viborg or Saint Petersbourg
- Died: 29 March 1884 (aged 92)
- Military career
- Allegiance: Russia
- Branch: Infantry
- Rank: General of the infantry; Adjutant general
- Conflicts: Patriotic War of 1812; War of the Sixth Coalition; Russo-Turkish War (1828–1829)

Count Vladimir Fyodorovich Adlerberg I (born Eduard Ferdinand Woldemar von Adlerberg; Russian: Владимир Фёдорович Адлерберг 1-й; 21 November 1791 – 29 March 1884) was a general in the Imperial Russian Army and a Russian government minister.

== Early life ==
He was the youngest son of a Swedish Colonel Gustav Friedrich Adlerberg (1738-1794) by his second wife, Baltic-German, Anna Charlotta Juliana von Baggehufwudt (1760-1839). Born into the Adlerberg noble family, which traces its lineage back to the Archbishop of Uppsala, Olov Svebilius whose children were ennobled with the name of Adlerberg.

== Life ==
Sources are unclear whether he was born in Vyborg or Saint Petersburg, but it is certain that he entered the military in 1811 as an officer in the Lithuanian Guard Infantry Regiment, with which he campaigned in 1812 and 1814. In 1817 he became adjutant and confidant to Grand Duke Nicholas, who he supported during the Decembrist uprising on 14 December 1825 and on whose staff he served as a major general during the Russo-Turkish War of 1828.

He became a lieutenant general in 1833 and between 1842 and 1852 served as Director General of the Post Office. In 1843 he was promoted to General of the Infantry, then four years later he was made a count, finally becoming Minister of the Imperial Court and chancellor of the orders in 1852. He fully backed Nicholas' authoritarian policies and acted as a personal servant to the tsar, used for several secret missions and duties. He retained some influence under Alexander II of Russia but did not support his liberal reforms.

In 1870, aged 79, he retired from public office, succeeded as minister by his eldest son Alexander, count Adlerberg II. (* 1819), General of the Infantry and Adjutant General, who during the last Russo-Turkish War was appointed to the general staff by Alexander III of Russia but removed from that role immediately after becoming a minister. Wladimir's second son, Count Nikolay Adlerberg, was another General of the Infantry and Adjutant General, who also acted as governor-general of Finland and wrote the 1853 book "From Rome to Jerusalem".

== Honours and arms ==
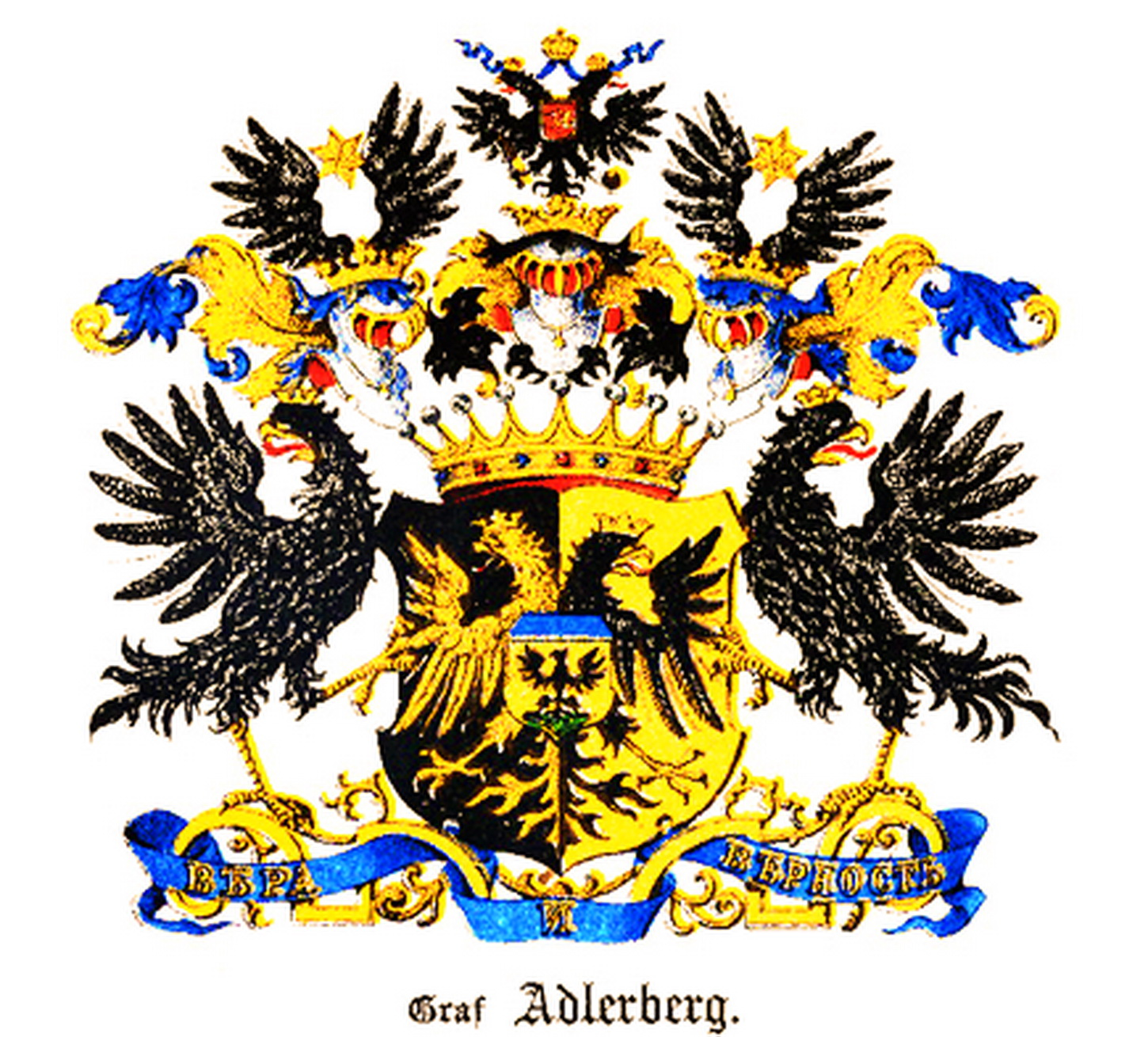
Coat of arms of the count's family, Adlerberg

- Austrian Empire:
  - Knight of the Imperial Order of the Iron Crown, 1st Class, 1833
  - Grand Cross of the Royal Hungarian Order of Saint Stephen, 1849
- Baden: Knight of the House Order of Fidelity, 1857; in Diamonds, 1863
- Kingdom of Bavaria:
  - Grand Cross of the Order of Merit of the Bavarian Crown, 1838
  - Knight of the Order of Saint Hubert, 1857
- Grand Duchy of Hesse: Grand Cross of the Ludwig Order, 16 June 1838
- Oldenburg: Grand Cross of the House and Merit Order of Peter Frederick Louis, with Golden Crown, 3 August 1853
- Principality of Montenegro: Grand Cross of the Order of Prince Danilo I, 1869
- Kingdom of Prussia:
  - Knight of Honour of the Johanniter Order, 16 January 1821; in Diamonds, 1825
  - Knight of the Order of the Red Eagle, 1st Class, 23 November 1834; in Diamonds, 1843
  - Knight of the Order of the Black Eagle, 3 June 1851; in Diamonds, 1856
- Saxe-Weimar-Eisenach: Grand Cross of the Order of the White Falcon, 12 September 1838
- Sweden-Norway: Commander Grand Cross of the Order of the Sword, 12 June 1838
- Two Sicilies: Knight of the Order of Saint Januarius, 1845
- Württemberg: Grand Cross of the Order of the Württemberg Crown, 1846
