= Mariya Svistunova =

Lady-in-waiting at the Russian Court (1778–1866)

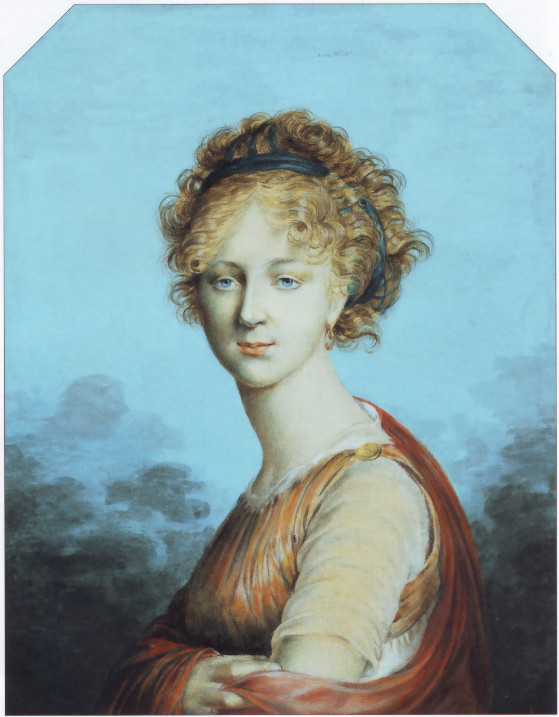
Mariya Svistunova

Mariya Alekseevna Svistunova, née Rzhevskaya (June 26, 1778, St Petersburg - September 1, 1866, Paris) was a lady-in-waiting at the Russian Court and a convert to Roman Catholicism. She was the daughter of writer Aleksei Andreevich Rzhevsky (1737–1804) and Glafira Ivanovna Rzhevskaya (1758–1826) (née Alymova). She married Nikolai Petrovich Svistunov (1770–1815) and they had two sons and four daughters.

== Biography ==
Mariya Aleksevna was born to the writer and poet, Senator Alexei A. Rzhevsky, and Glafira Ivanovna Alymova, his second wife and a lady-in-waiting. She was the eldest child and only daughter, her name being in honour of the Grand Duchess Mariya Feodorovna. Later four sons were born to the family.

The children grew up in a loving and caring environment. Their mother, one of the best graduates of the Smolny Institute, was a high society lady and notable musician. The Rzhevsky fortune was not large, and their financial position entirely depended on the service career of her father, that was developing quite successfully. Rzhevsky's house was a literary and musical salon, where St Petersburg intellectuals gathered. Mikhail Kheraskov, Gavrila Derzhavin and young Vasily Zhukovsky were regular visitors.

=== Life at court ===
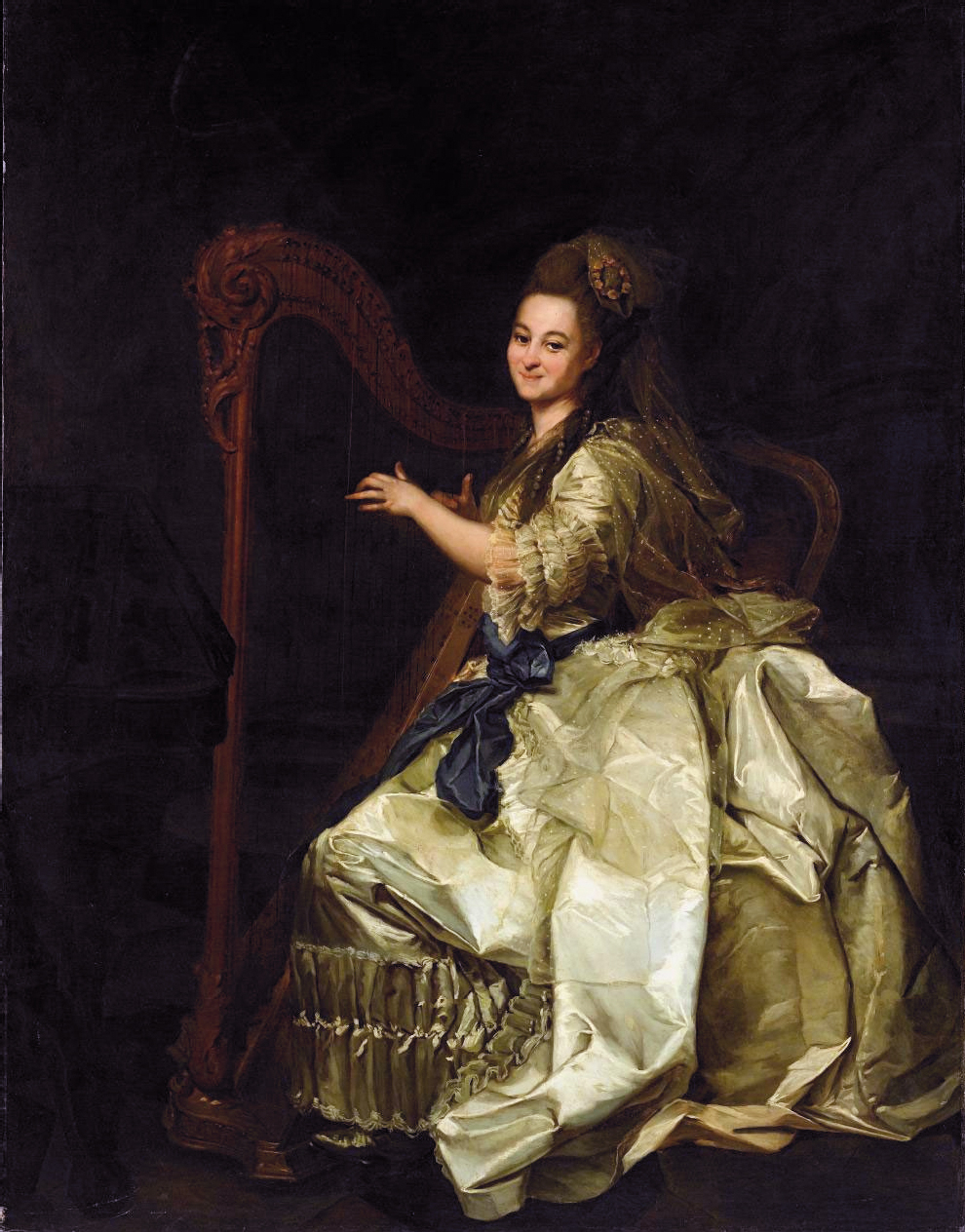
Glafira Ivanovna Rzhevskaya (after Dimitri Levicki)

Mariya was educated at home. She was instructed in sciences and music by her mother, who was a virtuoso harpist. Beautiful, slim and young, Mariya Rzhevskaya appeared at the court at the beginning of the reign of Paul I and was appointed lady-in-waiting. The emperor decided to take charge of her life himself and find a husband for her. His choice fell on the 29-year-old chamberlain Nikolai Petrovich Svistunov. He was a kind and noble person, and possessed a large fortune. Together with his father (Peter S. Svistunov, 1752–1808), he was among the favourites of the Emperor. So Mariya Rzhevskaya had to comply with this offer. The wedding was scheduled for 30 May 1800 in Pavlovsk.

=== Conversion ===
After her marriage to N. P. Svistunov, the couple occupied the purchased house in St Petersburg, where one after another their children were born. After the death of Paul I of Russia, Nikolai Petrovich immediately resigned because he could not reconcile himself with the rule of Alexander I. He was a mystically minded person, an admirer of the Masonic mystic Aleksandr Labzin and an active participant in the Masonic lodge.

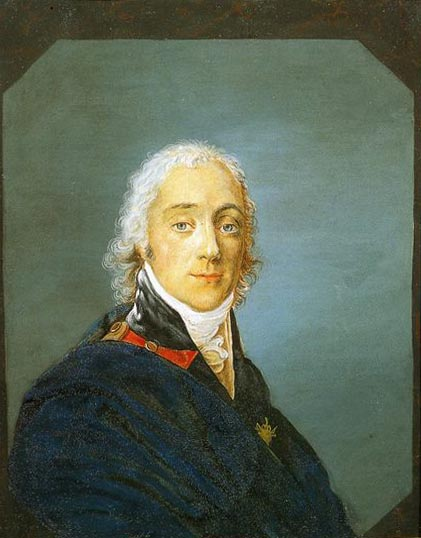
N. P. Svistunov

The interests of husband and wife differed. Mariya was one of the numerous Russian women of that era, who in passionate pursuit of truth, or for fashion, converted to Catholicism. Mariya became friends with Sophie Swetchine, a zealous supporter of Joseph de Maistre. In 1812 at the urging of his friend Vyazmitinov, Nikolai Svistunov returned to the service and worked as a director of the department in the Ministry of Police. But his health began to deteriorate, so he sought treatment by the mineral waters of the Caucasus, and died there of a fever on August 16, 1815.

After her husband's death, Mariya became a Catholic converting herself from Russian Orthodoxy, and was completely occupied in raising her six children. She sent her sons to the Jesuit boarding school of Baron Szabo. Education there was free, and the Jesuits were trying to strengthen and diversify their influence on the higher strata of Russian society. She tried to pass her religious beliefs and convictions on to her daughters. Mikhailovsky-Danilevsky called Mariya Alexeyevna a "famous pilgrim"; that did not stop her, however, holding balls for young daughters in Lent, which was very embarrassing at the time to St Petersburg society.

She was a member of the Women's Patriotic Society, and even published an article "Charity" in the Ladies Journal. The year 1826 was a hard time for Mariya Alexeyevna. Her mother died, and her eldest son Peter was convicted and sentenced to penal labour for his involvement in the Decembrist conspiracy. She moved to Paris, visiting Russia from time to time. She died in Paris on September 1, 1866, at age 88, in a Catholic convent, Du St Coeur de Marie.

=== Children ===
She had 2 sons and 4 daughters:

- Alexandra Nikolaevna (1802–1891), in 1822 she married the French consul general in Russia, Baron Zhan de Galts de Malvirad (died 1843).
- Petr Nikolaevich (1803–1889) - Decembrist and figure of the peasant reform of 1861, was married to Tatiana Stepanovna Neugodnikov.
- Glafira Nikolaevna (1804-18??) - received her name in honour of her grandmother, and was the second wife of Count A. A. de Balmen (1777–1848), Major-General, Commissioner of the Russian government under Napoleon, on the island of St Helena in 1816-1821.
- Aglaia Nikolaevna (dates unknown)
- Alexei Nikolayevich (1808–1872) - a Privy Councillor, was married to the lady-in-waiting Countess Nadezhda Lvovna Sollogub (1815–1903)
- Varvara Nikolaevna (181? - UNK)
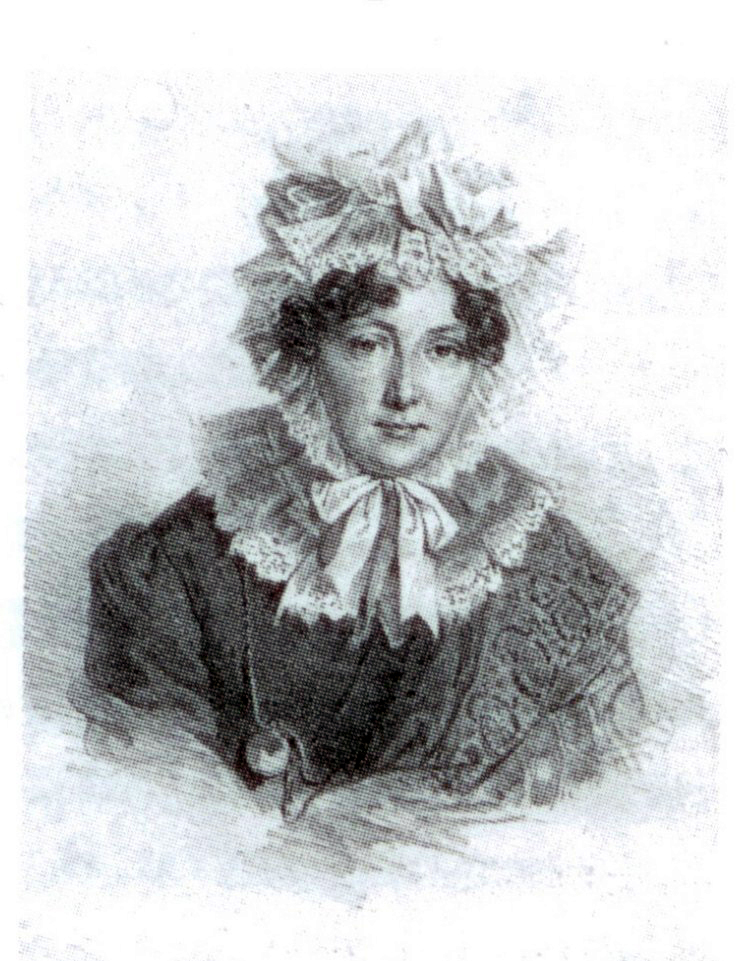
Mariya Svistunova

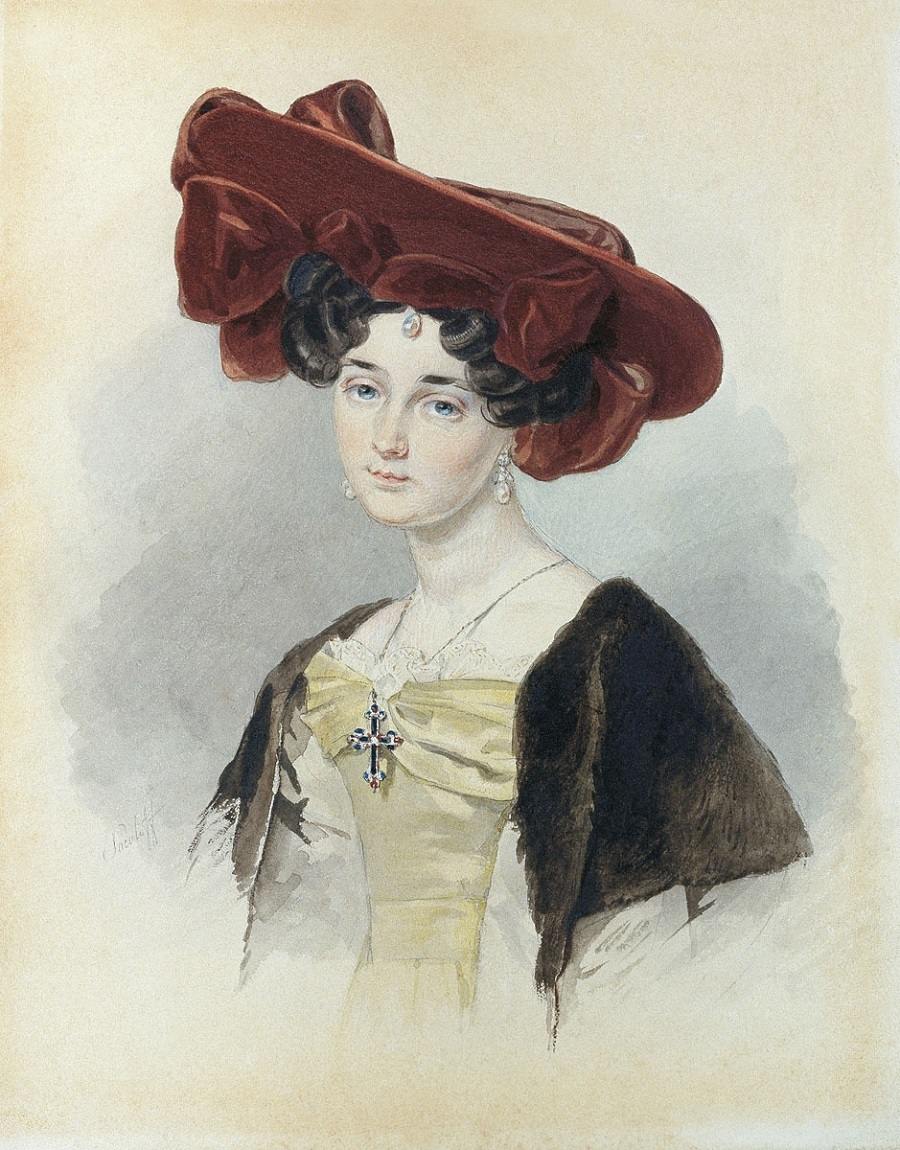
Alexandra

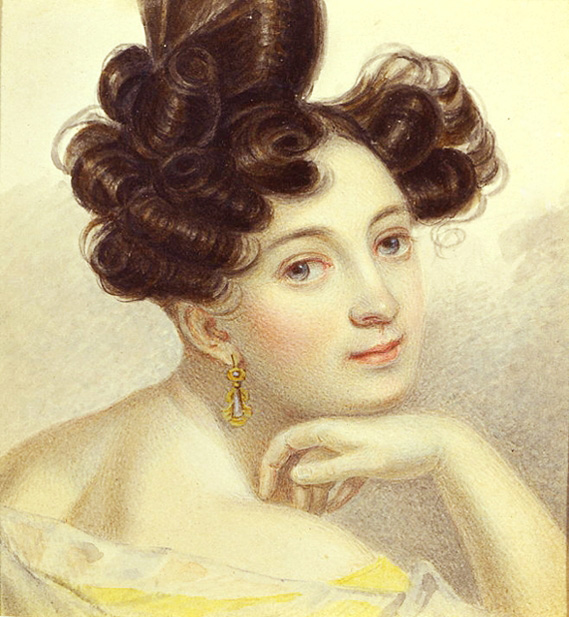
Glafira

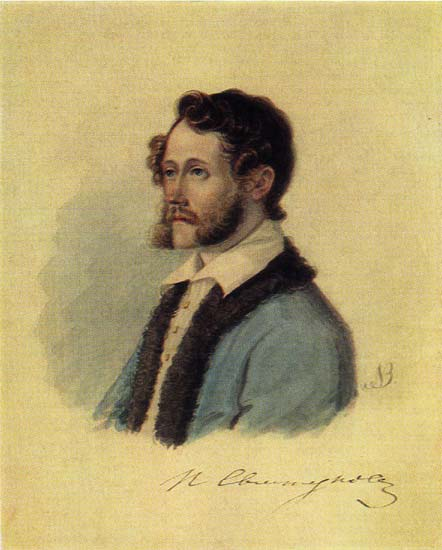
Petr

== Sources ==
- Information from Peter S. Svistunov (1752–1808); Memoranda Alymova; Svistunova Dom
- "Russian portraits of the 18th-19th centuries". Т.3. Vyp.3. № 79; Т.3. Vyp.3.№ 78. (translated title, in Russian)
- Cristin, Ferdinand; Turkestanova, Varvara Ilinichna, Lettres écrites de Petersbourg et de Moscou: 1817-1819 (Letters written from St Petersburg and Moscow: 1817-1819), Russian Archives. Moscou: Imprimerie de l'Universite Imperiale (M. Katkow), 1882.
- Mikhail-Danilevsky, A. J. "Notes of the years 1814–1815". Saint Peterburg, 1832 (translated title, in Russian).
- Ficquelmont, Dorothea, countess; Svetlana Mrochkovskii-Balashovii (ed.) Дневник, 1829-1837: весь пушкинский Петербург / Долли Фикельмон; публикация и комментарии Светланы Мрочковской-Балашовой. 2009; p. 55
