= Yelizaveta Palmenbach =

Russian pedagogue (1761–1832)

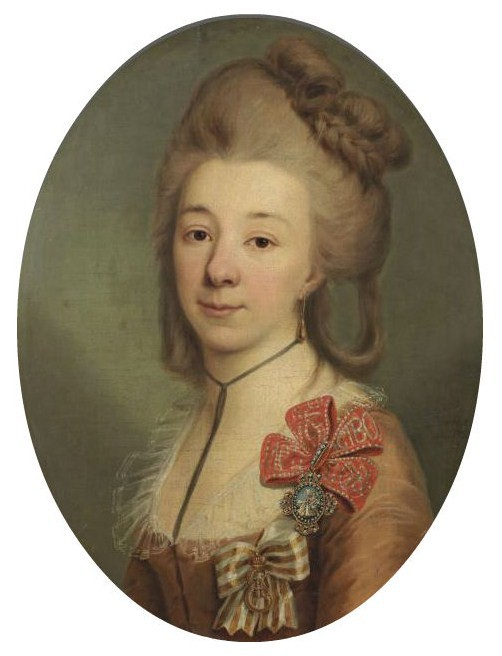
Portrait by Joseph Friedrich August Darbes, 1781

Yelizaveta Aleksandrovna Palmenbach or Palmenbakh (Russian: Елизавета Александровна Пальменбах; née Cherkasova; 1761–1832) was a Russian pedagogue and lady-in-waiting who served as the principal of the Smolny Institute in Saint Petersburg from 1797 to 1802.

== Biography ==
Yelizaveta was born in 1761 to Alexander Ivanovich Cherkasov and Hedvig Elizabeth von Biron, known as Ekaterina Ivanovna. Her uncle was Peter von Biron. She was educated at the Smolny Institute of Noble Maidens, after her graduation in 1779, she became a maid of honour. She married Colonel Evstafy (Gustav) Ivanovich Palmenbach on 16 August 1780 in Saint Isaac's Cathedral.

In 1796, she was appointed assistant to Sophie de Lafont, the head of the Smolny institute. De Lafon died in August 1797, after which Ekaterina became head of the institution, and attained the title of Excellency. She held this position until 1802.

She was close to Empress Maria Feodorovna who entrusted her with the education of two daughters of A. Kh. Bechendorff, and the princesses Biron. She was awarded the Order of Saint Catherine, small cross in 1801.

She died in Saint Petersburg 23 June 1832 and was buried in the Smolensky Cemetery. The following inscription is written on her monument:

"Here lies the body of the cavalry lady Elizaveta Alexandrovna Palmenbach, born Baroness Cherkasova, who died on June 23 1832, at the age of 71."

== Sources ==
- Сухарева О.В. Кто был кто в России от Петра I до Павла I, Москва, 2005

Political offices
| Preceded by Sophie Lafont | Principal of the Smolny Institute; 1797–1802 | Succeeded by Julia Adlerberg |
