= Yekaterina Nelidova =

Russian noblewoman and lady-in-waiting

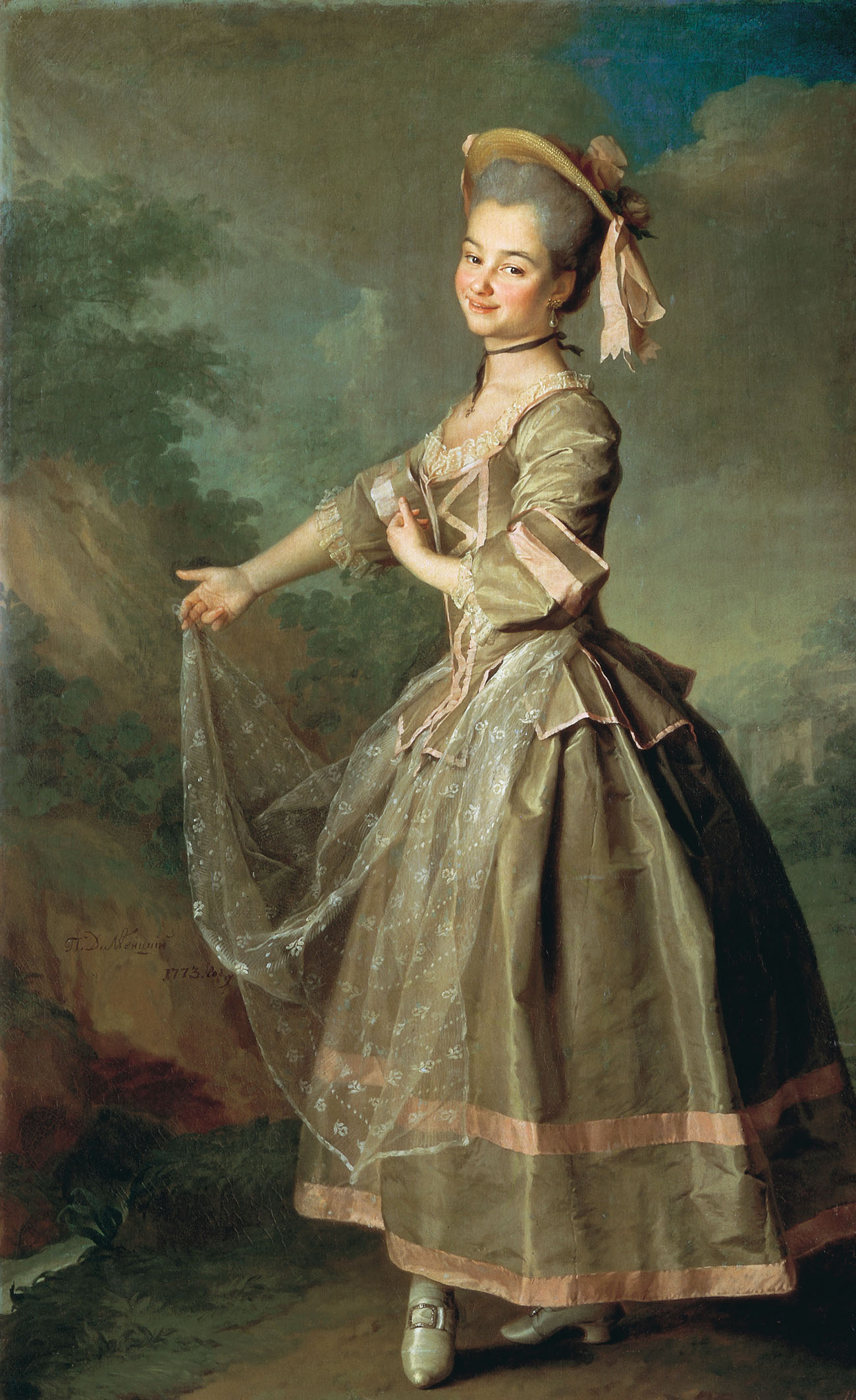
Yekaterina Nelidova

Yekaterina Ivanovna Nelidova (Russian: Екатери́на Ива́новна Нели́дова; 1756–1839) was a Russian noblewoman and lady-in-waiting. She was the royal mistress of Paul I of Russia.

Nelidova graduated from the Smolny Institute in 1776 and became a lady-in-waiting, first to Grand Duchess Natalia and then to Grand Duchess Maria alongside her friend and fellow graduate Natalya Borshchova. She had a relationship with Grand Duke Paul, the future monarch, and acted as a successful mediator between him and people he was in conflict with. Nelidova was also noted for her dramatic talents, which endeared her to the crown prince, who liked to stage operas with the participation of people he was close with.

She was an important courtier and her position also led to her relatives' acquiring positions at court. Paul's defense of Nelidova was even documented amid issues of social conformity at Catherine the Great's court. She left her position at court in 1798.

== Sources ==
- "Нелидова, Екатерина Ивановна" . Brockhaus and Efron Encyclopedic Dictionary (in Russian). 1906.
- Дмитрий Григорьевич Левицкий 1735—1822: Каталог временной выставки — Государственный русский музей. — Л.: Искусство, Ленинградское отделение, 1987. — 142 с.
- Шумигорский Е. С. Екатерина Ивановна Нелидова. Очерк из истории императора Павла. — М.: Захаров, 2008. ISBN 978-5-8159-0730-0.
