= Natalya Borshchova =

Russian courtier

Natalia Semyonovna Borschova
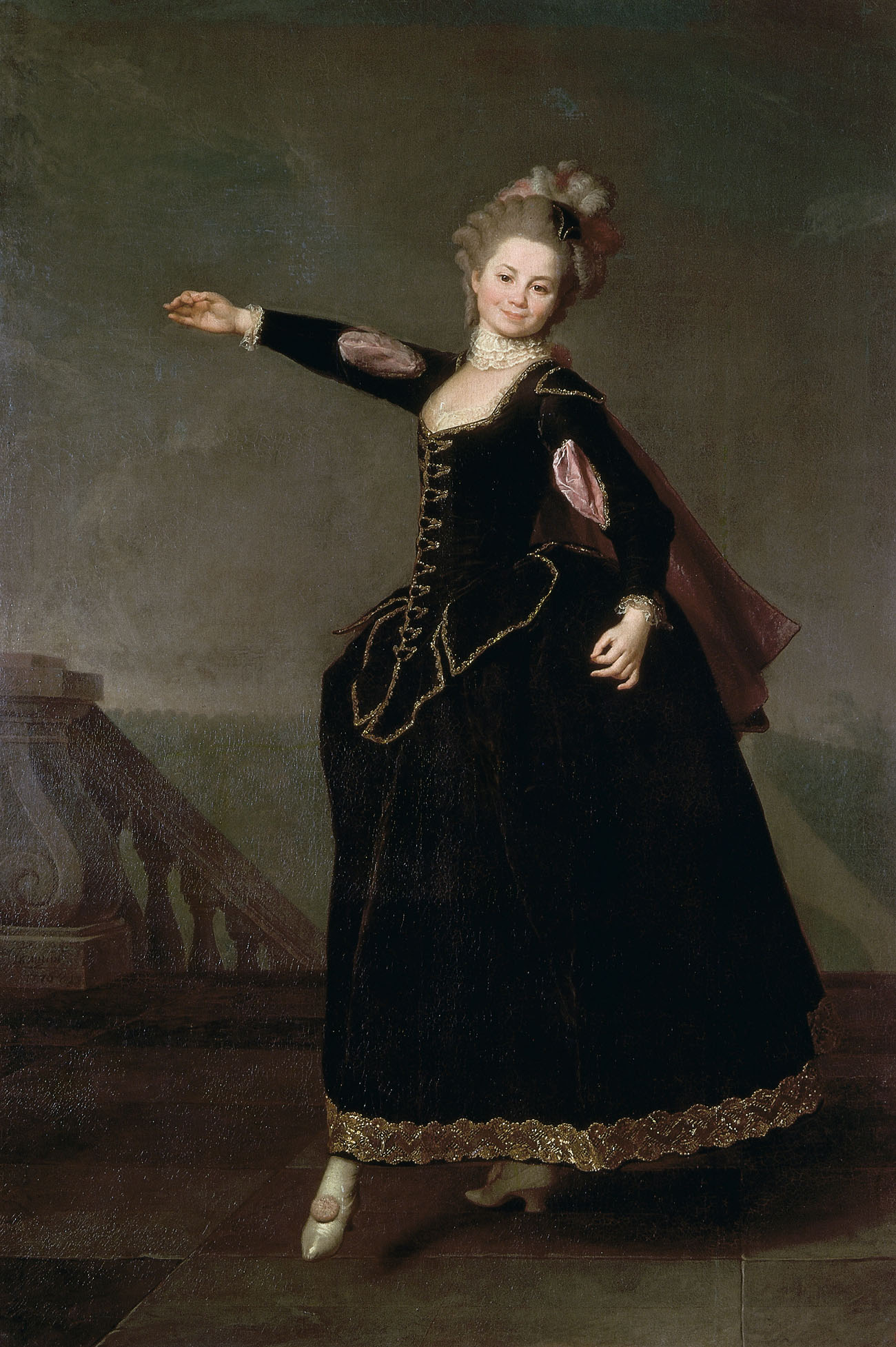
- Born: 9 August 1758
- Died: 31 October 1843 (aged 85)
- Buried: Smolensk Cemetery
- Spouses: Claudius Semyonovich Musin-Pushkin; Baron Wilhelm Ludwig von der Hoven
- Father: Semyon Ivanovich Borshov
- Mother: Ekaterina Alekseevna

Natalya Semyonovna Borshchova (9 August 1758 – 31 October 1843), was a Russian courtier. She graduated from the Smolny Institute of Noble Maidens. She served as lady in waiting to grand duchess Maria Feodorovna (Sophie Dorothea of Württemberg), and was a cavalier lady of the Order of Saint Catherine (as of 15 April 1841). She was a favorite of Maria, accompanied her to France in 1782, and known at court as a talented amateur actress.

== Biography ==
Natalya was the daughter of Semyon Ivanovicg Borshov and his wife Ekaterina Alekseevna. She was one of 7 siblings. In 1764, Natalya was admitted to the Smolny Institute where she was described as having a good voice, and took part in theatrical productions. As one of the best students, Natalya graduated in 1776 with a large gold medal, the position of maid of honour in the court of Tsarevna Natalia Alekseevna and a pension of 250 rubles a year. Following the Tsarevna's death in child birth, she served in the court of the Tsarevich's second wife, Maria Feodorovna along with her good friend Yekaterina Nelidova.

As part of her role, Natalya accompanied the couple on their journey through Europe in 1782 and on all official occasions, was ahead of Maria's friend Madame Beckendorff, and Princess Saltykova, wife of Nikolai Saltykov, who accompanied the couple unofficially.

Natlya did not enjoy the favour of the Grand Duchess, who felt burdened by her ladies-in-waiting who prevented her spending time with Beckendorff. But at court, she was much appreciated for her stage talent, as she repeatedly took part in performances staged by the Grand Duchess.

In 1809, she was appointed to Hoffmeisterin, and was granted the Order of St. Catherine of the Lesser Cross. Borschchova lived longer than al her friends, and died 31 October 1843, and was buried at the Smolensky Cemetery in Saint Petersburg.

== Family and Children ==
Natalya married the widower Claudius Semyonovich Musin-Pushkin (b.1741) 16 February 1785, who already had eight children:

- Pytor (1765-1834) lieutenant general. His daughter Ekaterina (1816-1897) was the favourite of Nicholas I.
- Ekaterina (b.1769), never married.
- Pavel (b.1771) major general and chief of the Vitebsk regiment, no issue.
- Alexander (b.1771)
- Alexandra, married Nikolai Vasilyevich Maslov.
- Sergei (1777-1853), major of the Chernigov Dragoon Regiment, colonel of the Chernigov cavalry, and participant in the Battle of Borodino, awarded Order of St. George 4th class.
- Nikolai (b.1779)
- Ivan (1783-1822), major general

Following the death of her husband, Natalya Semyonovna married Major General Baron Wilhelm Ludwig von der Hoven.
