= Maria Leontieva =

Russian pedagogue

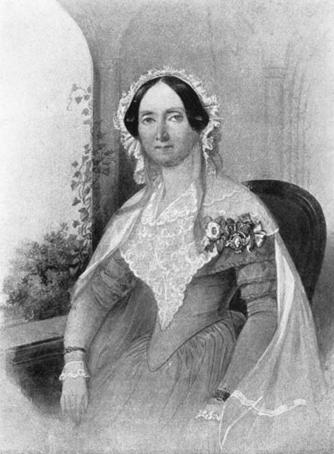
Maria Leontieva

Maria Leontieva (1792–1872), was an Imperial Russian pedagogue. She was the principal of the Smolny Institute in Saint Petersburg in 1839–1874.

She was the daughter of royal councillor Pavel Antonovitj Sjipov and Jelizaveta Sergejevna Sjulepnikova. She enrolled as a student at the Smolny Institute in 1800, graduated with the highest honors in 1809 and was the lady in waiting of Catherine Pavlovna of Russia prior to her marriage to Nikolaj Leontiev (d. 1827) in 1810. She was head lady in waiting of Grand Duchess Maria Nikolaevna of Russia, became deputy principal and shortly after principal of the Institute in 1839. She is described as a devoted but conservative principal, who kept a high level of education but a very strict discipline at school: she refused the reform to allow the student holidays in 1862. After 1870 she could not manage her position because of an illness.

Preceded by Julia Adlerberg	Principal of the Smolny Institute; 1839-1874	Succeeded by Olga Tomilova
