= Adlerberg family =

Swedish noble family

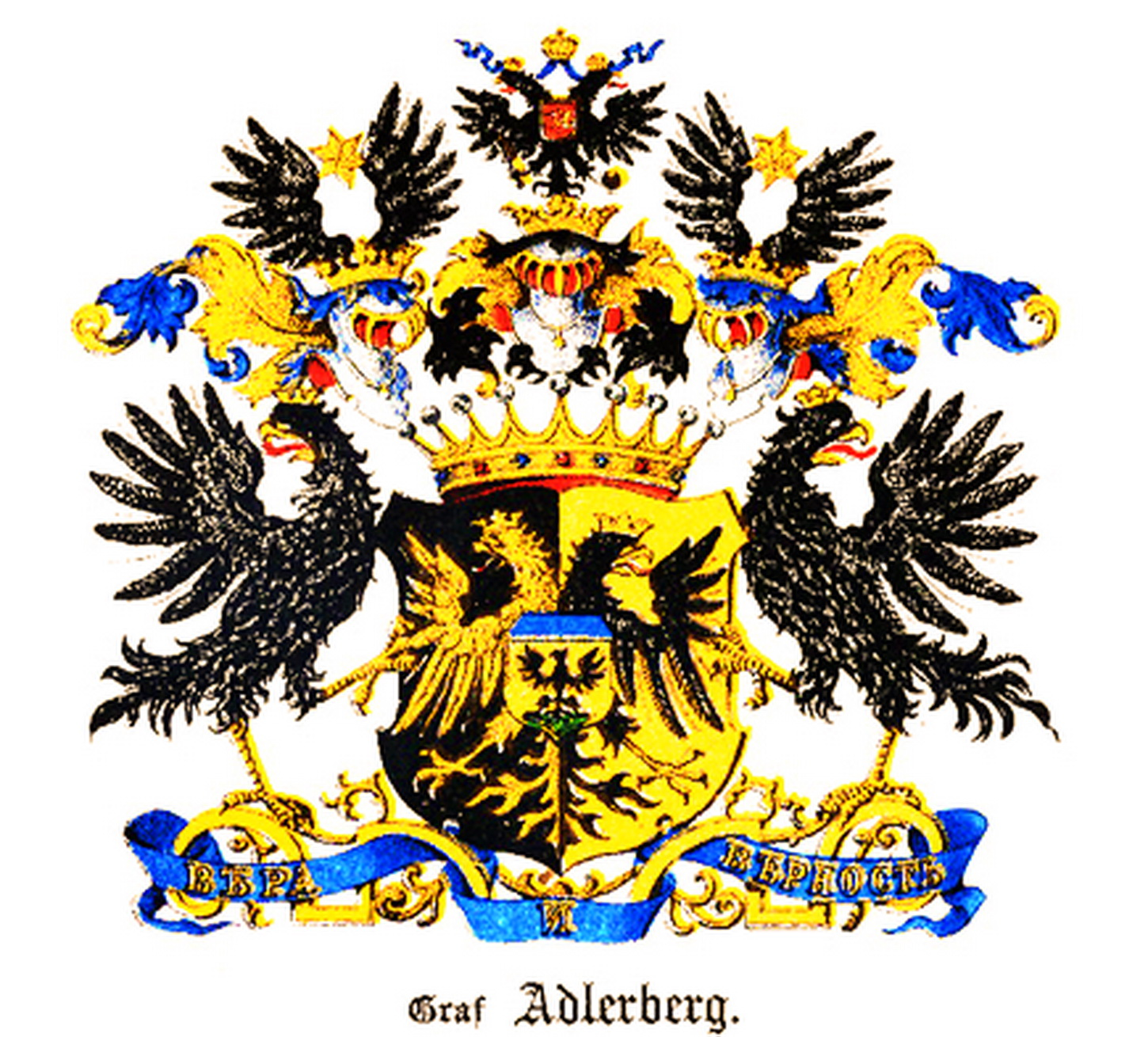
Coat of arms of Counts von Adlerberg

The Adlerberg family is a prominent Swedish Batlic noble family which originated from Sillerud in Värmland. Members of the family held significant positions within the Russian Empire, Sweden and Bavaria.

The family can trace its lineage back to the Olov Svebilius, Archbishop of Uppsala. His children were ennobled on 4 August 1684 with the name of Adlerberg by Charles XI. On 21 March 1810 they were awarded with the title of Baron in Sweden by Charles XIII, while on 14 June 1851, their cousins, who previously settled in Estonia, were elevated to the title of Count in Russia by Nicholas I of Russia. Swedish line of the family went extinct, while the Russian branch still exists in Russian diaspora.

== Notable members ==
- Amalie Adlerberg (1808–1888), Bavarian noblewoman and socialite
- Ekaterina Adlerberg
- Herman von Adlerberg (1890 – 1919)
- Julia Adlerberg (1760–1839), Baltic-German noblewoman, principal of the Smolny Institute in Saint Petersburg
- Nikolay Adlerberg (1819–1892), Chancellor of State and Chamberlain at the Imperial court of Russia
- Vladimir Adlerberg (1791–1884), a general in the Imperial Army of Russia
