= Anna Sergeyevna Dolgorukaya =

Russian pedagogue, noble and courtier

Anna Sergeyevna Dolgorukaya (1719–1778) was a Russian pedagogue, noble and courtier. She was the first principal of the Smolny Institute in Saint Petersburg in 1764–1764.

She was the daughter of Councillor prince Sergei Petrovich Dolgoruky (1696–1761) and princess Irina Petrovna Galitzine (1700–1751) and sister of prince V. S. Dolgoruky (1724–1803), Russian ambassador in Prussia, and married in 1746 to prince Alexei Golitsyn (1713–1765). She had been a courtier prior to marriage. Described as well educated, intelligent and witty, she was appointed to the post of the newly founded Smolny Institute by Empress Catherine the Great. However, she proved to be to dominant and superstitious to be suitable for the position, so the monarch paid her to resign. In 1766, she retired to Moscow.

Preceded by Post created	Principal of the Smolny Institute; 1764-1764	Succeeded by Sophie Lafont
