= Glafira Alymova =

Russian lady-in-waiting and harpist (1758–1826)

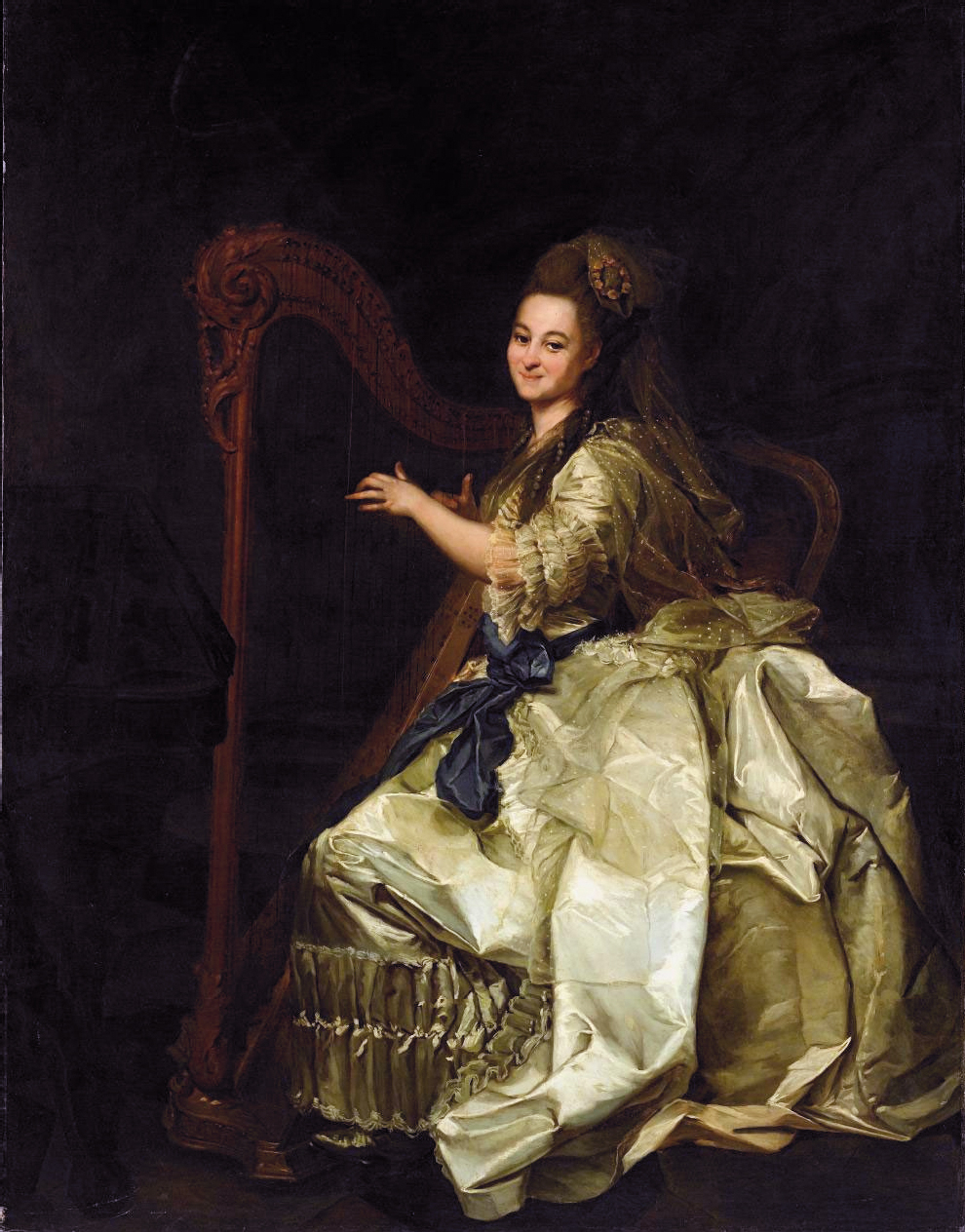
Glafira Alymova playing the harp (after Dimitri Levicki)

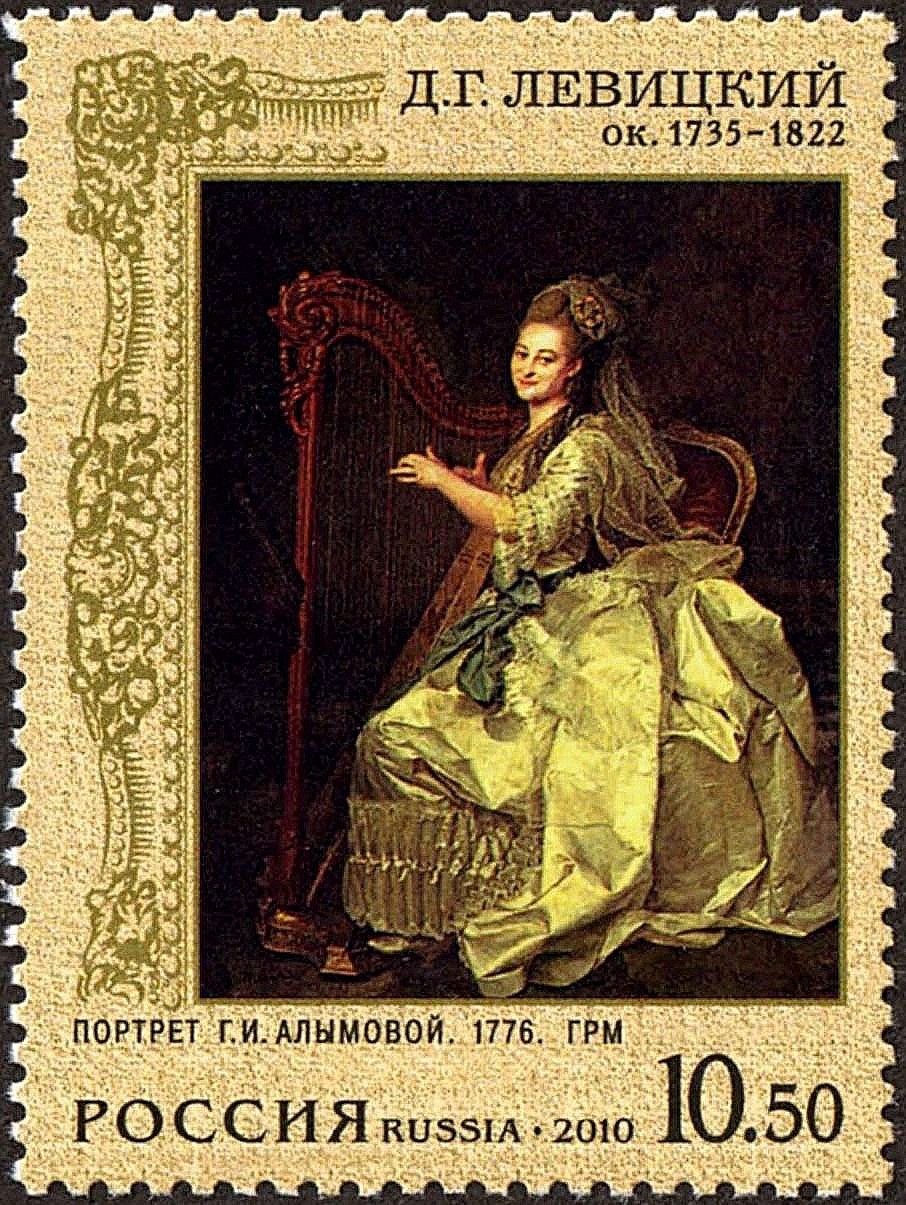
Alymova commemorated on a 10.50-rouble stamp, 2010

Glafira Ivanovna Alymova (1758–1826) was a Russian lady in waiting and harpist.

== Biography ==
Glafira Alymova was the daughter of Colonel Ivan Akinfievich Alymov, who died very shortly before her birth, as she discussed in her autobiography. She lived a difficult childhood without much parental affection or care; she was the nineteenth child born to her mother, who did not bond with the young Glafira.

At age 7 she was sent to the pioneering Smolny Institute, where she studied from 1764 to 1776, as one of its first students; there, she excelled in music. While she was a student there, one of the trustees of the school, the powerful Ivan Betskoi (a man 55 years older than Glafira), became infatuated with her, and in her autobiography she describes his pursuit and continual harassment of her. This continued even past her graduation, when, she being at this point an orphan without options, he promised to treat her as a daughter, as long as she agreed to live with him, and only marry a man who would agree to live with them in Betskoi's home. Reluctantly, she agreed, but once she lived in Betskoi's home, he continued to isolate and harass her.

On her graduation in 1776, she was decorated as one of its five best students, and was made lady in waiting to the Empress Catherine the Great. The Empress was fond of her because of her good humor and temperament.

In 1777, she received a proposal from Alexei Rshevskii, a nobleman and writer, who was 20 years older than her. Though Betskoi greeted the proposal with rage, he grudgingly permitted it, if only to frustrate other suitors who had begun to pursue Glafira. Despite Betskoi's attempts at sabotage, she and Rzhevskii were married, though for a time they were forced to live with Betskoi, until they were able to flee. Rzhevskii became a senator and privy councillor.

In 1805 she married Hippolyte Masclet. This second marriage, to a man twenty years younger than her and of lower social status, was regarded a scandal.

Mariya Svistunova was her eldest child and only daughter.

Glafira Alymova was regarded as one of the best harpists of her time. She was awarded the order of St Catherine by Empress Catherine.

== Sources ==
- Ржевская Г. И. (Алымова) Памятные записки Глафиры Ивановны Ржевской // Русский архив, 1871. — Кн. 1. — Вып. 1. — Стб. 1-52.
- Дмитрий Григорьевич Левицкий 1735—1822: Каталог временной выставки — Государственный русский музей. — Л.: «Искусство», Ленинградское отделение, 1987. — 142 с.
- Казовский, Михаил. Екатерина: мудрость и любовь: историческая повесть. — М.: Подвиг, 2010.
