= Maria Novosiltseva =

Russian pedagogue (1830–1910)

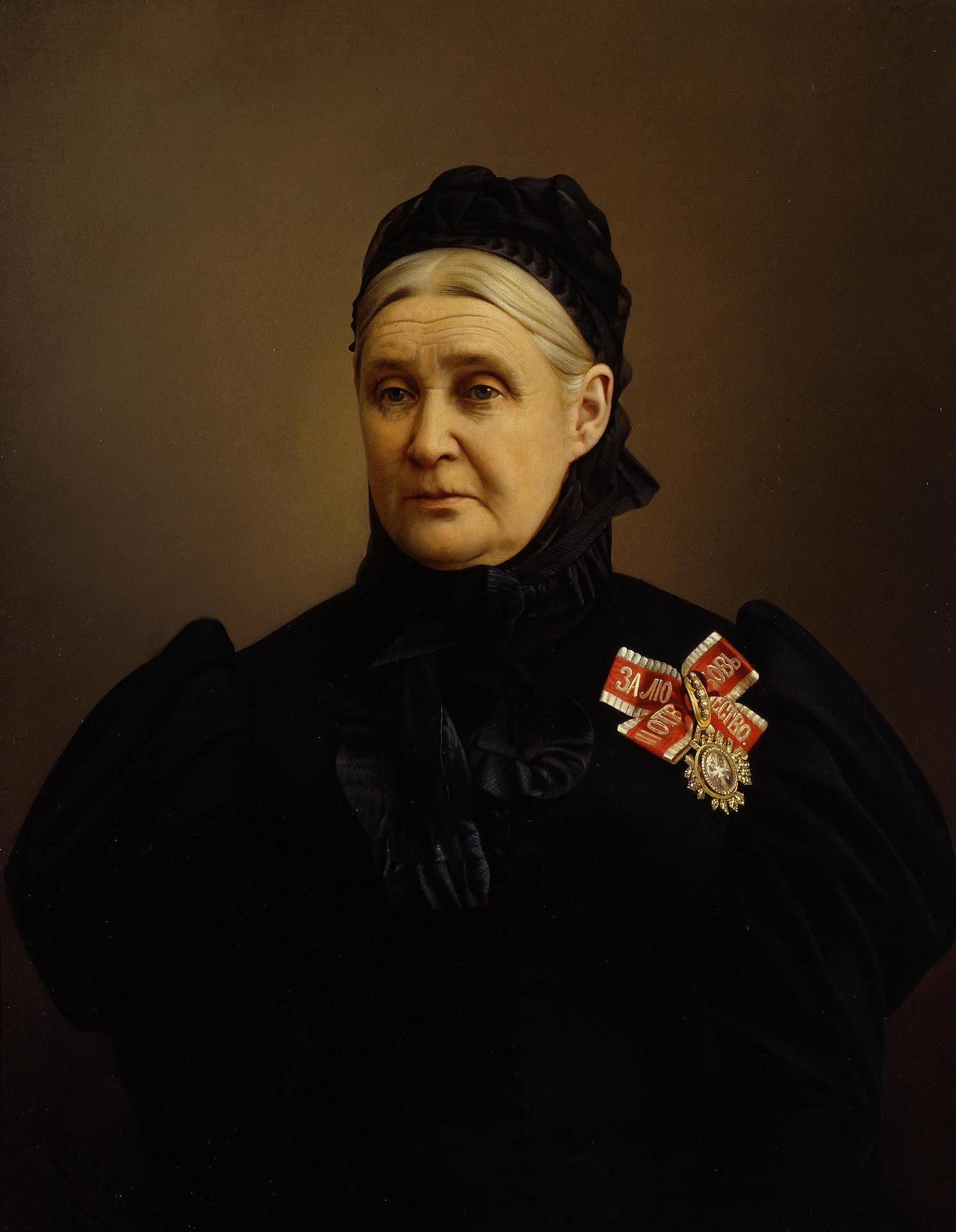
Maria Novosiltseva

Maria Novosiltseva (1830–1910) was a pedagogue from the Russian Empire. She was the principal of the Smolny Institute in Saint Petersburg in 1886–1895.

She was the daughter of noble Peter Kozhin and married the estate owner Ivan Novosiltsev (1823–1870) in 1847. She was appointed principal by Maria Feodorovna (Dagmar of Denmark) after her effort as a nurse during the Russo-Turkish War (1877–1878). She lacked education and changed nothing in the institute at the educational level, but she reformed the medical care at the institute and was described as popular and considerate.

Preceded by Olga Tomilova	Principal of the Smolny Institute; 1886–1895	Succeeded by Jelena Lieven
