= Olga Tomilova =

Russian pedagogue (1822–1894)

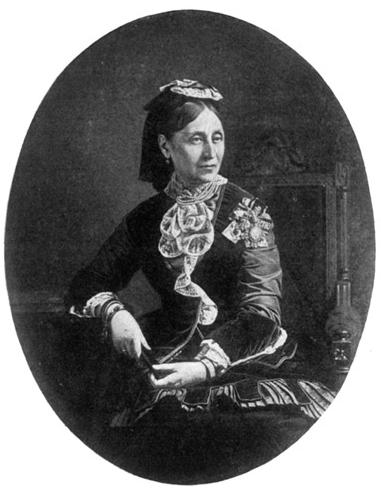
Olga Tomilova

Olga Tomilova (1822–1894), was a Russian pedagogue, born a member of the Engelhardt family.

== Biography ==
She was the principal of the Smolny Institute in Saint Petersburg from 1875 to 1886. She graduated from the Smolny Institute with the highest honors in 1839 and was a lady in waiting prior to her marriage to the estate owner Roman Tomilov (1812–1864). As a widow, she became a lady in waiting and in 1872 deputy principal of the institute. She was an innovator who reformed the institute with ideas she had observed in Western Europe, were formal education was at this time made available for women. Among her innovation was training in practical craftsmanship.

== Sources ==
- Шереметьевский В. В. Русский провинциальный некрополь. — 1914.

Preceded by Maria Leontieva	Principal of the Smolny Institute; 1875–1886	Succeeded by Maria Novosiltseva
