= Sophie de Lafont =

Russian educator (1717–1797)

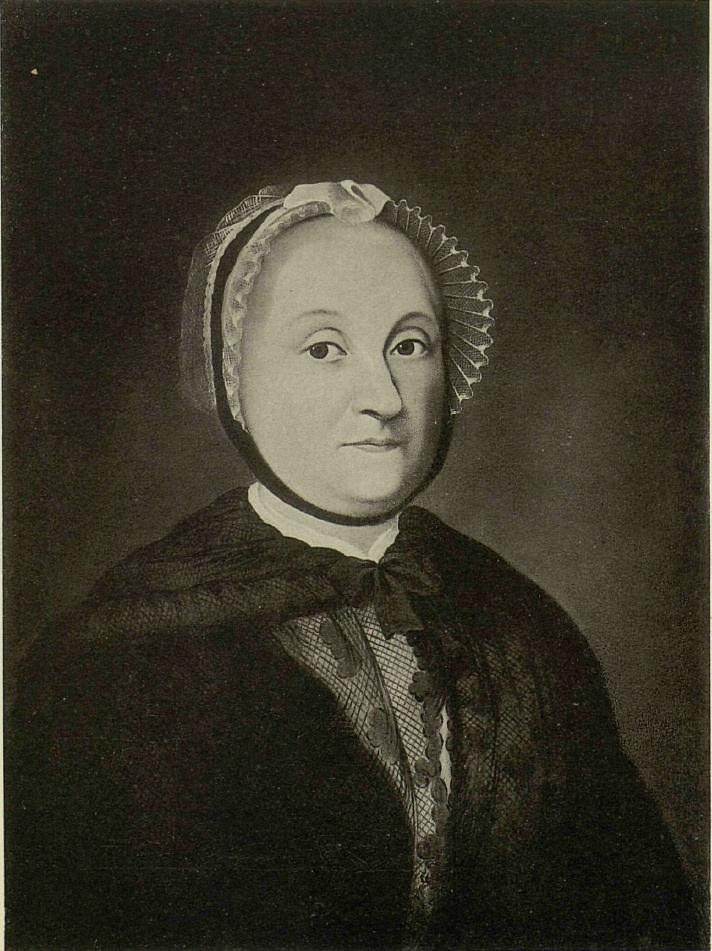
Portrait, 18th century

Sophie de Lafont (also known as Sofya Ivanovna de Lafon; Russian: Софья Ивановна де Лафон; née Dubuisson; August 1717 – August 1797) was a Russian pedagogue of French descent. She was the principal of the Smolny Institute in Saint Petersburg from 1764 to 1797.

== Life ==
Lafont was the daughter of French Huguenot wine merchant Jean Dubuisson, who founded the first hotel in the Russian capital of Saint Petersburg. She was their only daughter.

She married Guillaume de Lafont, a French officer in Russian service, but her marriage was unhappy, as her spouse suffered from a mental illness which several times exposed her to abuse. She attempted to cure him by consulting doctors in Switzerland and France, but this did not result in anything but economic ruin. As a poor widow with two daughters, she applied for help from the Russian embassy in Paris to return to Saint Petersburg. She encountered Ivan Betskoy, who judged her to be suitable for the position of principal of the Smolny Institute, and recommended her as such to Catherine the Great.

=== Principal ===
Ivan Betskoy considered her kind and friendly, but also honest, intelligent, strong and with an ability to handle people and organize. She shared the conviction of Betskoy that it was more effective for students to learn by installing admiration and confidence for their mentors rather than fear, as was the contemporary norm.

She was recommended for her educational ability. As an educator, she promoted religious and moral goals. She was described as mother figure for her students, who appreciated her for her tenderness and treated her with gratitude and respect. Aware that her students were, by regulation, not allowed to spend much time with their families, she played the part of mother for them, and according to contemporary reports, she did this with success: she reportedly treated her students like her daughters, and they loved her like a mother. It is noted that she never used physical punishment, which was at that time accepted both for parents and teachers. She also lived in the Institute, as did her students.

The goal of the institute at the time was to give their students a high education in order to make them better mothers and teachers to their children, and reportedly, the education of the graduates from the institute normally had a level of knowledge which far exceeded their husbands. Her former students, reportedly, often returned to the institute to have her approval of their suitors and show her their children and ask for her advice. Empress Maria Feodorovna called her "notre bonne vieille maman".

Upon the succession of emperor Paul I in 1796, she was awarded the Lesser Order of St Catherine. The same year, she was formally given permission to attend court, the lack of had having until then been a complaint from those of her students being ladies-in-waiting, as she had not been able to attend their weddings at court. She was succeeded by Jelizaveta Palmenbach.

== Legacy ==
A street in Saint Petersburg, Lafonovskaya, was named after her.

Preceded by Anna S. Dolgorukaya	Principal of the Smolny Institute; 1764-1797	Succeeded by Jelizaveta Palmenbach
