= Jelena Lieven =

Russian pedagogue (1842–1917)

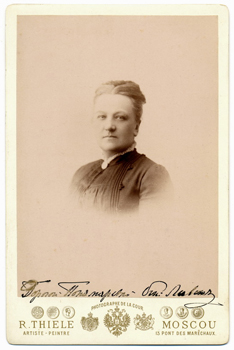
Jelena Lieven

Jelena Lieven (1842–1917) was a Russian pedagogue. She was the principal of the Smolny Institute in Saint Petersburg from 1895 to 1917.

== Life ==
She was a daughter of Alexander Lieven. Jelena Lieven was not formally educated but received a very high level of education through Autodidacticism. She was early active with her mother as a philanthropist. She never married, and after having received a very small inheritance after her father's death in 1880 she asked the Imperial family for a position. She was made manager of the home for the orphans of officers and in 1895 as principal for the Smolny Institute. She reformed the hygiene, introduced electricity (1909), granted the students leaser time by cutting their study time by half, gave craftsmanship and physical education a greater role and made a fund for the support of former students after graduation (1898). She died during the Russian Revolution, and the students of the institute was evacuated.

== Sources ==
- Давыдов А. Воспоминания. 1881—1955. — Париж, 1982.

Preceded by Maria Novosiltseva	Principal of the Smolny Institute; 1895–1917	Succeeded by None
