= Julia Adlerberg =

Swedish pedagogue (1760–1839)

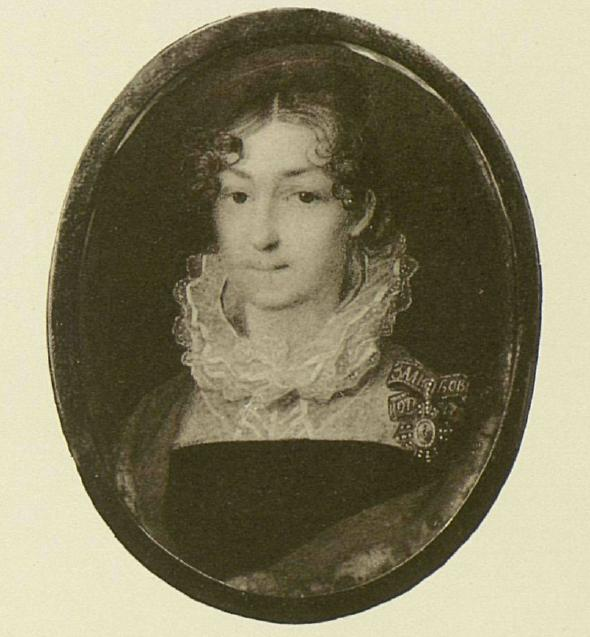
Adlerberg in the 18th century

Anna Charlotta Juliana Adlerberg (Russian: Юлия Фёдоровна Адлербе́рг; née Baggehufwudt; 1760–1839) was a Swedish pedagogue. She was the principal of the Smolny Institute in Saint Petersburg from 1802 to 1839.

== Early life ==
She was the daughter of the Baltic German noble Friedrich Wilhelm von Baggehufwudt (1726–1785) and his wife, Charlotta Eleonora von Rosenthal-Pergel (1743–1768).

== Marriage and issue ==
Juliana married in 1785 to a Swedish Colonel in Russian service, Gustav Friedrich Adlerberg (d. 1794). She became the mother of the imperial governess Julia von Baranoff.

== Biography ==
In 1792, she was appointed governess for Grand Duke Nicholas and his brother, Grand Duke Michael of Russia. In 1802, she was appointed principal of the Smolny Institute. She was made dame d’honneur in 1824 and received the Order of Saint Catherine (second degree) in 1835. The park outside the Smolny Institute, Adlerbergskogo, was named after her.

== Sources ==
- Anna Charlotta Juliana Bagghufvud; Wilhelmina Stålberg. Anteckningar om svenska qvinnor (1864).

Preceded by Jelizaveta Palmenbach	Principal of the Smolny Institute; 1802–1839	Succeeded by Maria Leontieva
