= History of Mykolaiv =

Timeline of Mykolaiv

- Russian Empire 1789 - 1917
- Ukrainian War of Independence
  - Russian Provisional Government Mar - Nov 1917
  - Ukrainian People's Republic Nov 1917 - Jan 1918
  - UPRS Jan - Mar 1918
  - Imperial Germany / Austria-Hungary May - Dec 1918 (occupation)
  - UPR Dec 1918 - Jan 1919
  - France/Greece Jan - Mar 1919 (intervention)
  - UPRS Mar - May 1919
  - Hryhoriv Uprising May 1919
  - UPRS May - Aug 1919
  - AFSR Aug 1919 – Jan 1920
  - PWPGU/UkrSSR Jan 1920 – Dec 1922
- Soviet Union 1922 - 1941
- Nazi Germany 1941–1944 (as part of Reichskommissariat Ukraine, under occupation)
- Soviet Union 1944–1991
- Ukraine 1991–present

The history of Mykolaiv starts with the human settlement of the city, which is believed to have begun around 20,000 years ago during the Upper Paleolithic era. In antiquity, the site inhabited by a Cimmerian settlement known as the Dykyi Sad archaeological site, which was founded around 1250-925 BC. In the medieval era, the area around Mykolaiv was ruled by the Lithuanians under Vytautas the Great, who founded the fortress of Vitovka as a border and an area for diplomacy with the Crimean Khanate. Due to constant fighting over the next few centuries, Mykolaiv would remain sparsely populated as part of the Wild Fields.

Modern-day Mykolaiv was founded in the aftermath of the Treaty of Küçük Kaynarca, which gave the area to the Russians, with the first permanent re-settlement of Mykolaiv happening in 1784 as "Faberova dacha". In 1787, the dacha's land grant was annulled after Mikhail Faleev chose the area to be the site of a new shipyard in Novorossiya following orders of Grigory Potemkin. The city was formally founded in August 1789 as Nikolaev, which came under the rule of a military governorship after being chosen as the site of the Black Sea Fleet headquarters in 1795, and quickly developed into a major regional naval city. Nikolaev would garner much more significance during the Crimean War, when it was used as a base for Russian troops during the Siege of Sevastopol, and because following the Treaty of Paris the city was allowed to keep its shipyard despite bans on Russian naval items on the Black Sea. In 1862, the port of Nikolaev became a commercial port open to foreign vessels, which facilitated further expansions, especially given the Treaty of London, which allowed the admiralty to be returned to Nikolaev, and the founding of the Black Sea Shipyard. During the Ukrainian War of Independence and the wider Russian Civil War, the city would constantly change hands, notably as part of the Hryhoriv Uprising in May 1919, before falling under Bolshevik control in January 1920. The city was then annexed into the Soviet Union in 1922. During the start of Operation Barbarossa in 1941, the city was quickly captured by Nazi Germany from the Soviets, who then deported thousands of citizens, set up the Stalag 364 prisoner-of-war camp, and killed up to 5,000 Jewish citizens as part of the Holocaust. The city was eventually liberated by the Soviets following Ol'shanskiy Landing in 1944.

After the war, Nikolaev would continue to grow due to its shipyards such as Black Sea, Okean, and Mykolayiv, although it remained a closed city. Other companies also opened up, including Zorya-Mashproekt, Nikolaev Alumina Plant, and Dormashina, although this industrialisation started to dry up by the late 1980s. In 1991, Nikolaev became part of a newly independent Ukraine, after which the Ukrainian transliteration Mykolaiv came into wider use. During the early 2000s, many cultural objects were opened while privatisation of the city's economy began. In 2012, the city became the site of mass protests following the murder of Oksana Makar over the perceived corruption of the Ukrainian justice system. Two years later, in 2014, during Euromaidan protests, the city became the site of both large pro-European protests and smaller pro-Russian protests, which culminated in April when pro-Russian separatists attempted to take over the oblast's administration, which was prevented. The city then began to gradually recover, although in the early 2020s the Black Sea Shipyard was declared bankrupt while Okean was put under seizure order. In 2022, during the Russian invasion of Ukraine, the city was quickly targeted by Russian forces, starting the Battle of Mykolaiv. During the battle, Russian troops began a partial encirclement and seized some ground in the city before having to retreat. Since then, the city has been heavily shelled by the Russians, although at the same time Mykolaiv has also received international aid, most notably from the Danish government.

== Early history ==
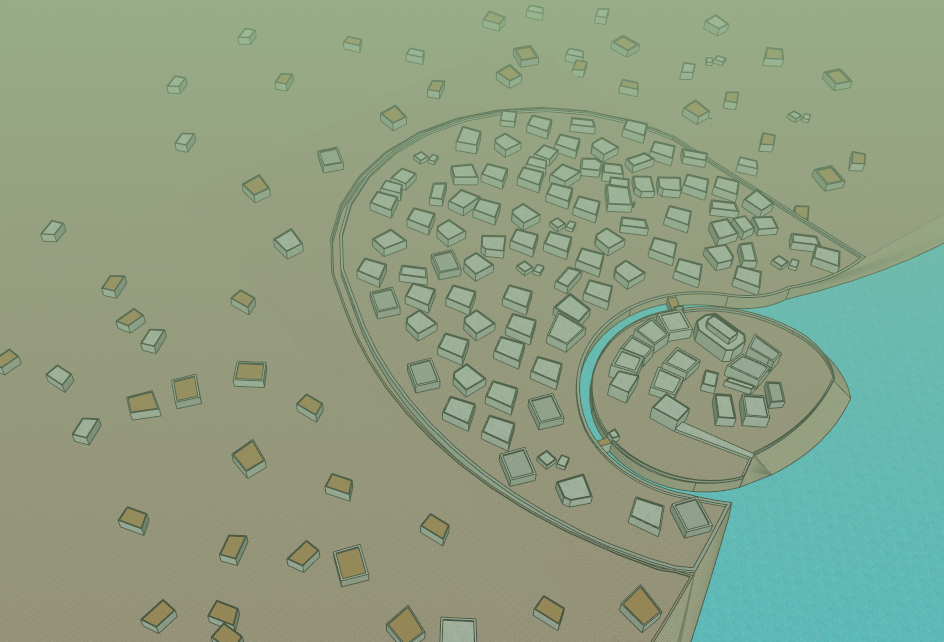
Digital reconstruction of Dykyi Sad archaeological site

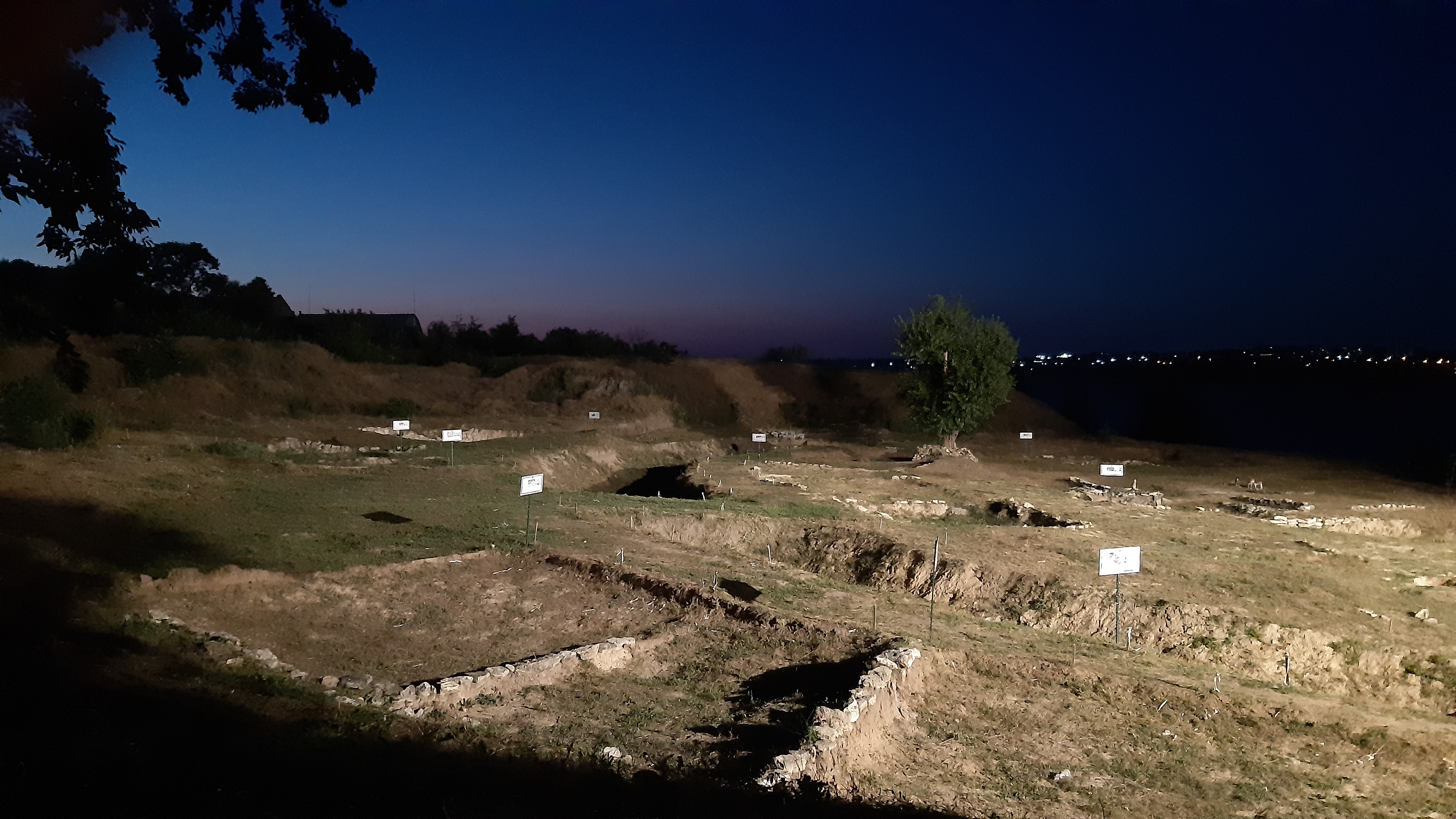
Excavation site of Dykyi Sad

=== Antiquity ===
It is thought that the area around Mykolaiv was first settled around 20,000 years ago during the Upper Paleolithic era, in part due to its proximity to the sea and relatively mild climate. Numerous settlements dating to the Neolithic era have been found, mostly in a concentration near the Astronomical Observatory of Mykolaiv.

The most major archaeological find from this era before Mykolaiv was permanently settled was in 1927, with the discovery of a Cimmerian settlement that is dated to the Bilozerka culture from around 1250-925 BC, and later went under the name of the Dykyi Sad archaeological site. It is located within the now historic centre of Mykolaiv at the corner of Artyleriiska and Naberezhna streets and is estimated to be around three to four hectares. The initial excavation of the site before the 1950s by Kaminskyi found a bronze cauldron that weighed 37 litres. Further excavations done in the 1950s by Kyiv University would follow, although major excavations of the site would only really begin in the 1990s. These excavations found that the site consisted of a fortified citadel with housing nearby and then rows of housing near the Inhul. Among the most notable items found from the site were a moat that was roughly 90 metres long and two foundations of bridges to the citadel. One of the two bridges, the southern one, is believed to have been constructed in 1250 BC, which would make it one of the oldest known bridges of the type in Eastern Europe. Some of the other finds include numerous bronze objects, bone cheekpieces for bridles, bone shoes used to move across ice, and ceramics.

Due to these finds, some of the excavators that were part of the project have argued that the settlement is the "city of the Cimmerian people" that is mentioned by Homer in the Odyssey, and was also called similar to the Mycenaean fortresses or Troy due to the radial-ring layouts. However, these theories have generally been dismissed as sensationalist and still a hypothesis, although it has been agreed that the site is important for the Bilozerska culture.

=== Medieval era ===
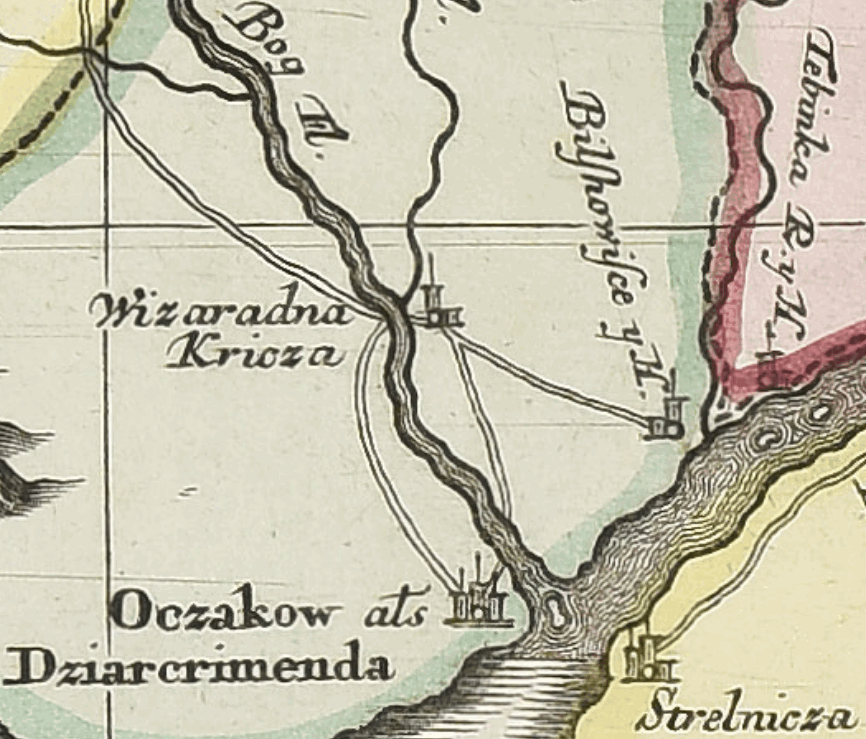
A 1730 map mentioning Vitovka (Вітовка), which is marked in Polish as "Winoradna Kricza"

The next time the city was significantly recorded was during the medieval era, when Vytautas the Great founded the fortress of Vitovka on the estuary, which is now within the Korabelnyi district of Mykolaiv. Vitovka was part of a series of fortifications that the Lithuanians constructed, such as the fortress of Sokolets near Voznesensk and Ochakiv. The fortress served twofold: on one hand, it was meant to serve as a border against the Crimean-Nogai slave raids, and also act as an area for trade and diplomacy with the Crimean Khanate. Due to this, according to Oksana Hospodarenko, trade in the area near the Black Sea was able to take place, moving from Crimea to the Grand Duchy of Lithuania. After the decline of Lithuanian power, the city passed into Ottoman area as de jure part of the Crimean Khanate, although de facto it remained barren and unpopulated as part of the Wild Fields due to constant fighting between Muscovy, Lithuania, and the Khanate.

=== Cossack era ===
The territory of the modern Mykolaiv Oblast were part of the Zaporozhian Sich Bugo-Hard Palanka. According to the 1756 Zaporozhian Host Register only 8,000 people resided here; due to frequent Crimean Tatar raids, they lived predominantly on remote, fortified farmsteads for defensive reasons.

== Imperial city ==
=== Founding of Mykolaiv ===
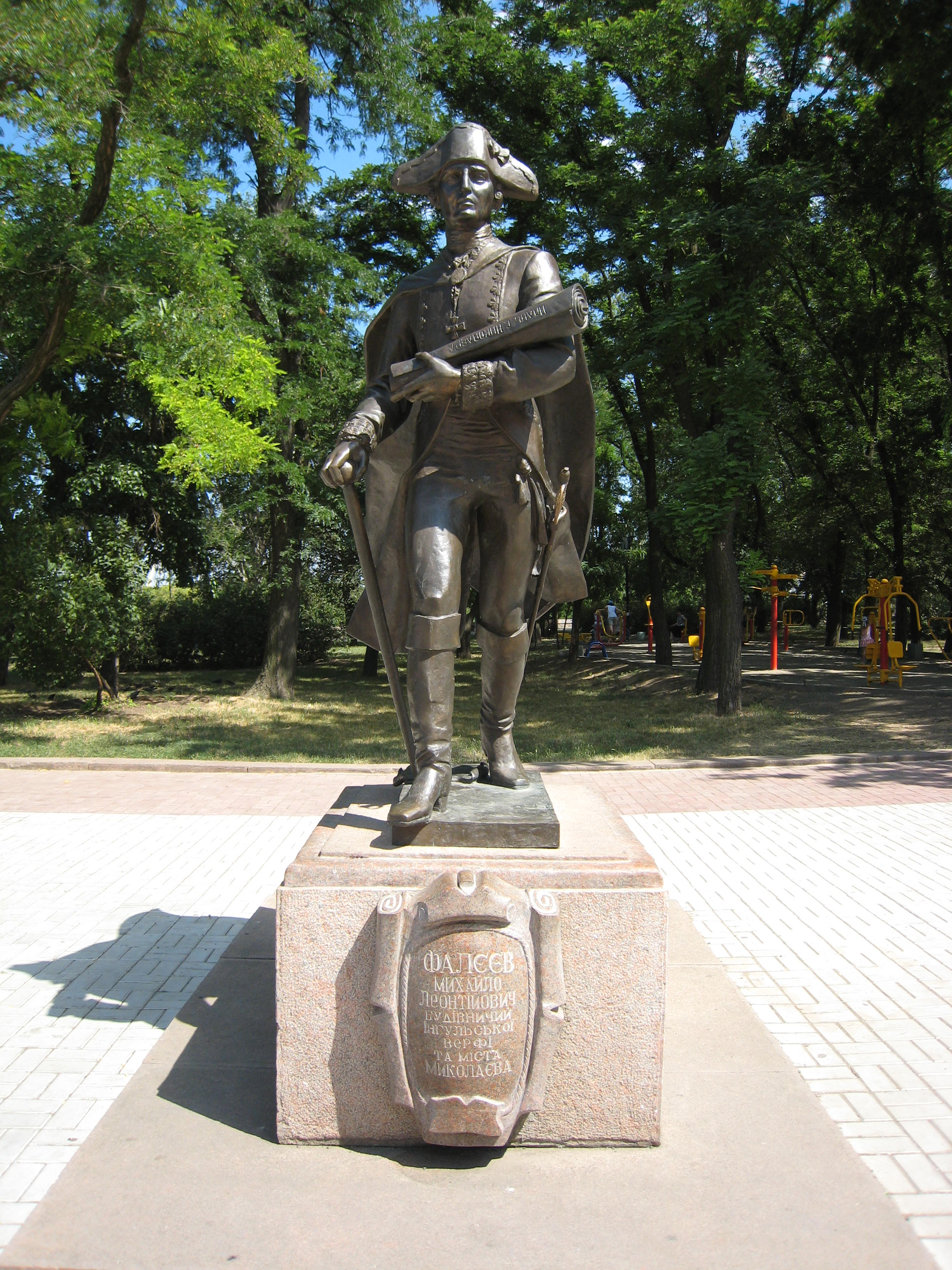
Monument to Mikhail Faleev, the founder of modern-day Mykolaiv.

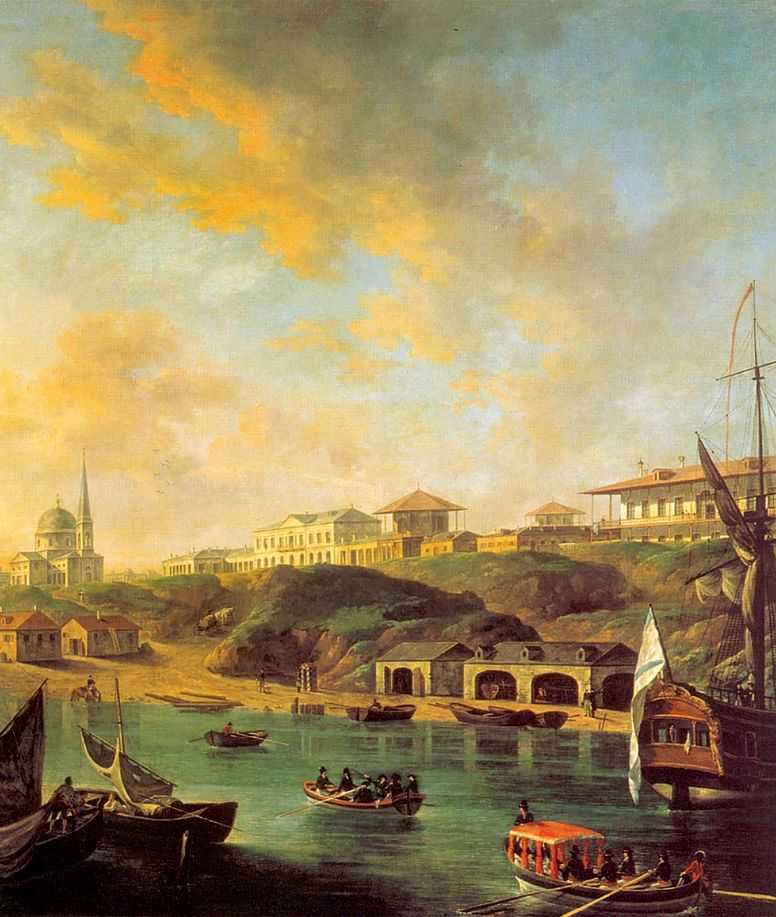
Painting of the city of Nikolaev upon its founding, 1799.

The founding of the modern city is generally considered to have started as a response to the Treaty of Küçük Kaynarca, which ended the Russo-Turkish War (1768–1774), giving Russia the area of the Yedisan region between the Bug and Dnieper rivers. After this, Russians began populating the area and constructing ports and shipyards, such as the one in Kherson that was founded in June 1778. The first landholder near Mykolaiv was Franz Fabre, an Austrian merchant based in St. Petersburg. In 1783, he requested the Governor-General of Novorossiya, Grigory Potemkin, to settle at the Bug River an agricultural estate, which was granted in 1784 with 1,500 desyatinas of land. The resulting estate known as the "Faberova dacha" was given at just three kopecks per desyatina, and covered the entire city of modern Mykolaiv. Fabre then built on the estate a main house with a mill, a yacht club, a farmstead, a house, tavern, and smithy.

However, Fabre's control would not last long. By 1787, Potemkin came to the conclusion that Kherson would not be a good area for a shipyard due to the marshes and flooding, and so he tasked Mikhail Faleev with finding a better site for a shipyard in Novorossiya. Faleev would not come near the dacha until that summer, when the Ottomans performed a cross-border raid into Fabre's dacha, killing one, and so Faleev was sent to settle the incident. After arriving, Faleev found that the area would be a good candidate for the proposed shipyard, and so Fabre's land grant was immediately annulled, being returned to the treasury of the Novorossiya Governorate on 2 September 1787.

That summer, navigators went to the Inhul to start, and on 21 July 1788 Faleev was ordered to prepare the shipway for building two fifty-gun ships, with construction started in autumn under engineer I.V. Sokolov. The founding documents of Mykolaiv happened shortly thereafter. By order No. 282 of 27 April 1789, Potemkin told Faleev that "I entrust to your care..the establishment of a wharf on the Inhul". He then followed this up with order no. 1065 of 27 August 1789, which is widely considered the founding date of Mykolaiv. In this order, Potemkin writes "Faberova dacha is to be named Spasskoye, and Vitovka (Bogoyavlenskoye), the newly established wharf on the Inhul, the city of Nikolaev." It is thought that the name Nikolaev traces back to 26 June 1789, when Potemkin in report no. 34 asked Catherine II to found a new monastery known as "Spaso-Nikolaevsky" for soldiers of the Russo-Turkish War (1787–1792) following the recent nearby Siege of Ochakov (1788), which was shortly thereafter approved. Nikolaev was taken from this name for the city, and Spaso was given to Spasskoye later in August. Where exactly the name Nikolaev in the monastery name comes from is heavily disputed, with some saying that it was named after the frigate of Svyatyi Nikolai or the capture of Ochakiv which happened on Saint Nicholas Day. (Note: The former theory, of the city being named after the frigate, has in recent years been generally disproven. The first document that mentioned the frigate comes from 12 November 1789 when a General-Adjutant Lvov was ordered to command it, which is later than the city order of 27 August 1789.) Either way, shortly after Nikolaev's founding, in November 1789, Potemkin in report no. 84 asked Catherine II to grant Nikolaev the status of city under The Charter of the Towns of 1785 (in part, due to its "advantageous place"), although Catherine II denied this because Nikolaev at this point really only had a military population and no ship had been built at the shipyard yet. The first ship was finally laid on 5 January 1790, which was the frigate St. Nicholas, and launched on 25 August 1790 to be towed to Ochakiv for arming. In October 1790, Nikolaev was listed as a Supernumerary town, thus bringing it under the administration of a military governor and not a governorate.

=== Early years ===
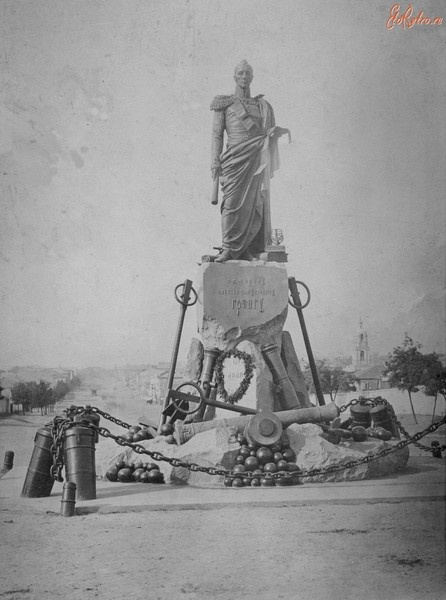
Monument to Aleksey Greig, the military governor of Nikolaev from 1816 to 1833. The monument was dismantled during the Soviet-era.

In order to form the new Nikolaev as a city, on the invitation of Potemkin, the renowned architect Ivan Starov (who was known for designing the Tauride Palace) was brought in to create a general plan for the city in the spring of 1790. Starov then created the design for the general plan of the city, the Cathedral of St. Gregory the Illuminator of Armenia, the Magistrat, and the Stone Shops. He worked with Colonel Ivan Kniazev on designing the working plan for the city, orienting the streets, and going through with the design. Kniazev worked on designing the new city until 1791, when he was reassigned to a fortress in Crimea, and Dutch architect Vincent Vanrezant took over until December 1792 when Kniazev came back. During this time, the first enterprises besides the shipyard also started to pop up, such as a Faience shop, although in that same year a major fire destroyed many of the housing, and so wooden construction was banned by Potemkin. In that year, over 3,000 shipbuilders were relocated to Nikolaev, working under sharp military discipline with recruits frequently becoming sick, leading to desertion. During the ongoing Russo-Turkish War, many Turks, who were prisoners of war, were also brought to Nikolaev to work. By the end of 1791, there were 26 households with 147 inhabitants, although there was a severe gender imbalance. The population grew tenfold the following year, in 1792 to 1,566 residents. However, development would sharply slow down with the deaths of both Petmokin and Faleev soon after.

Nikolai Mordvinov then became chairman of the Black Sea Admiralty Board. Under Mordvinov, a new general plan was constructed for the city that was described as "grand" with the city stretching further south, although nothing ever came of this except the construction of the first bridge in Nikolaev (Inhul Bridge), the transfer of the Black Sea Admiralty Headquarters from Kherson to Nikolaev in 1795, and Nikolaev also under Paul I of Russia formally became a closed city to foreigners. During this time, there were also some attempts to also strip the admiralty administration from the city, thus not making it a military governorship, in favour of Odessa being the sole one in the area, but this was ultimately shut down. Mordvinov was dismissed in 1799 after an explosion at the powder magazine plant in 1798, and Nikolaev was then very briefly under the administration of Admiral von Dezin and Jean Baptiste, marquis de Traversay. Under Traverse, from 1802 to 1803, Nikolaev came under the Nikolaev Governorate until the unit was abolished and put de jure back under the Kherson Governorate (although Nikolaev had its own military governorship independent of the governorate). The Napoleonic Wars hardly effected Nikolaev, since Napoleon entered Russia via Belarus during his invasion, although a 75th Naval Crew of the Black Sea Fleet was formed in Nikolaev in 1812 to combat the invasion.

However, the subsequent governorship of Aleksey Greig from 1816 to 1833 did have a large effect on the city. He helped reconstruct the city with many new buildings, including the Mykolaiv Observatory headed by Karl Friedrich Knorre, and a chain of optical telegraph stations linking the city to Sevastopol. He helped pave the streets, ordered the construction of the city's water pipeline, and helped drive commerce to the city. Controversially, though, an imperial decree under Nicholas I in 1829 expelled all Jews from both Nikolaev and Sevastopol beyond a marked line, which Greig hardly stopped even though he opposed the decree because of public unrest, in fact only helping out Jews in the city whom he thought were essential. After Greig was dismissed in 1833, Mikhail Lazarev took over until 1851. Lazarev was considered, at least by the account of Decembrist D. I. Zavalishin, somebody who did not care about the city beyond anything naval. Lazarev undid much of what Greig had done, halting funding for the water pipelines, moving many artifacts in Nikolaev to Odessa, and trying to close the newly built astronomy. He did continue the practice of removing the Jewish population in the city, which was said to be completed by 1837, of which modern accounts say was heavily negative to the city as it significantly drove up prices and housing. Nevertheless, the little progress that was made included the opening of the first theatre in the city in 1840, and street names were introduced in 1835.

=== Crimean War ===
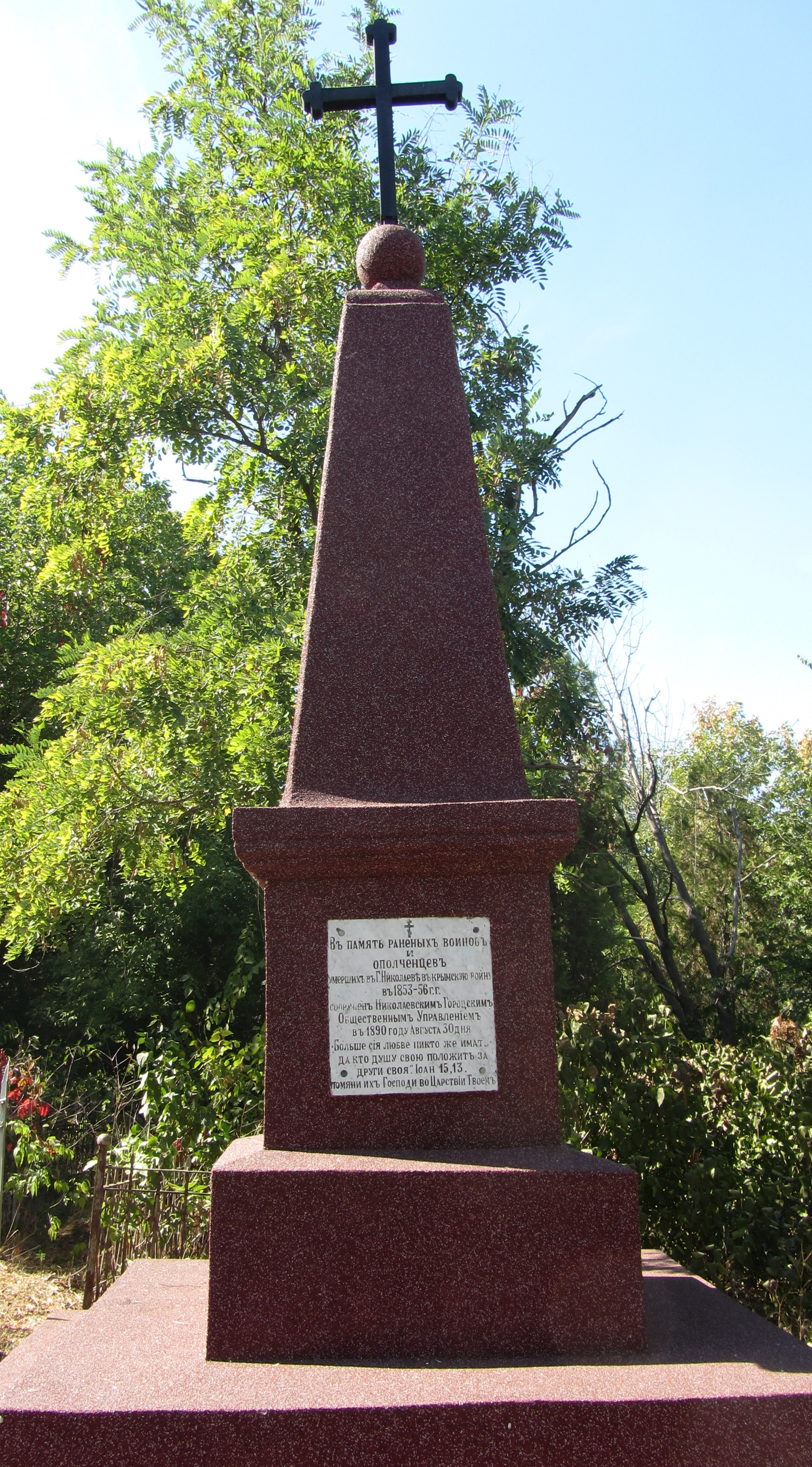
Memorial to the Crimean War in Mykolaiv. The monument was constructed in 1890.

By the start of 1853, the city of Nikolaev had around 40,000 inhabitants, and the Commander-in-Chief of the Black Sea Fleet, and thus governor of Nikolaev, was Admiral Moritz Berch. After the start of the Crimean War, the city would garner much more significance, as the city was used as a military camp with the population almost doubling. In January 1853, most of the officers in Nikolaev were recalled for duty for the Kherson garrison battalion, while all foreigners were expelled from the city. In preparation for the war, merchants in the city donated 7,000 rubles to defend the city, mostly by strengthening the walls around the city and cutting out embrasures. As the war drew nearer to the city in 1854, the defense of the city was handed over to Dmitri Osten-Sacken and Nicholas Annenkov.

During the Siege of Sevastopol, the city heavily sustained the war effort, with the townspeople supplying transport and lodging for the troops going to Crimea (mostly barracks from merchants, but also private housing). The city also provided medical aid, with many buildings in Nikolaev being repurposed to be temporary military hospitals, although these buildings were not suitable and left the medical staff strained as the city was overcrowded. This was best seen in November 1855, when 30,000 troops entered the city, with some having undeclared typhus, which killed many patients and doctors. Thousands of refugees also came to Nikolaev from Crimea, bringing in their families. After the Battle of Kinburn, the situation only worsened as Alexander II personally sent an engineer to design a full defensive system along the Bug, such as in Niikolaev, and to help with the hospitals.

With the defeat of Russia in the Crimean War, Alexander II signed the Treaty of Paris. As a direct result of this treaty, the admiralty in Nikolaev was closed down, although the shipyard in the city was allowed to be kept on a technicality. According to the treaty, the ban on all Russian naval items was only applicable to areas lying on the Black Sea, and so the tsar requested an exemption that Nikolaev was, in fact, not on the Black Sea but in the Southern Bug. However, the British representatives did not want the loophole to take into effect, so at the conference for the treaty George Villiers, 4th Earl of Clarendon demanded for a separate clause to destroy the shipyards in Nikolaev. The tsar's representative, Orlov, held in his stance that Nikolaev did not fit the descriptions in the treaty agreed upon, and reassured the representatives that no navy was intended to be built in Nikolaev. In the end, Britain's claim was shot down with Napoleon III calling it "excessive", and Nikolaev's shipyard was allowed to be kept. Nevertheless, the closure of the admiralty would have a tremendous effect on Nikolaev, with many finding themselves unemployed, and so many began to leave in an exodus. In his writing about Nikolaev, historian G.N. Ge said of this time:

In the deserted, depopulated city, life completely stopped, no longer making any demands. Meanwhile, in the outskirts of the city, unemployment increasingly demoralised the population. And this sad state of affairs reached the point where, after sunset, it became dangerous to leave one's home in Nikolaev.

=== Late 1800s and industrialisation ===
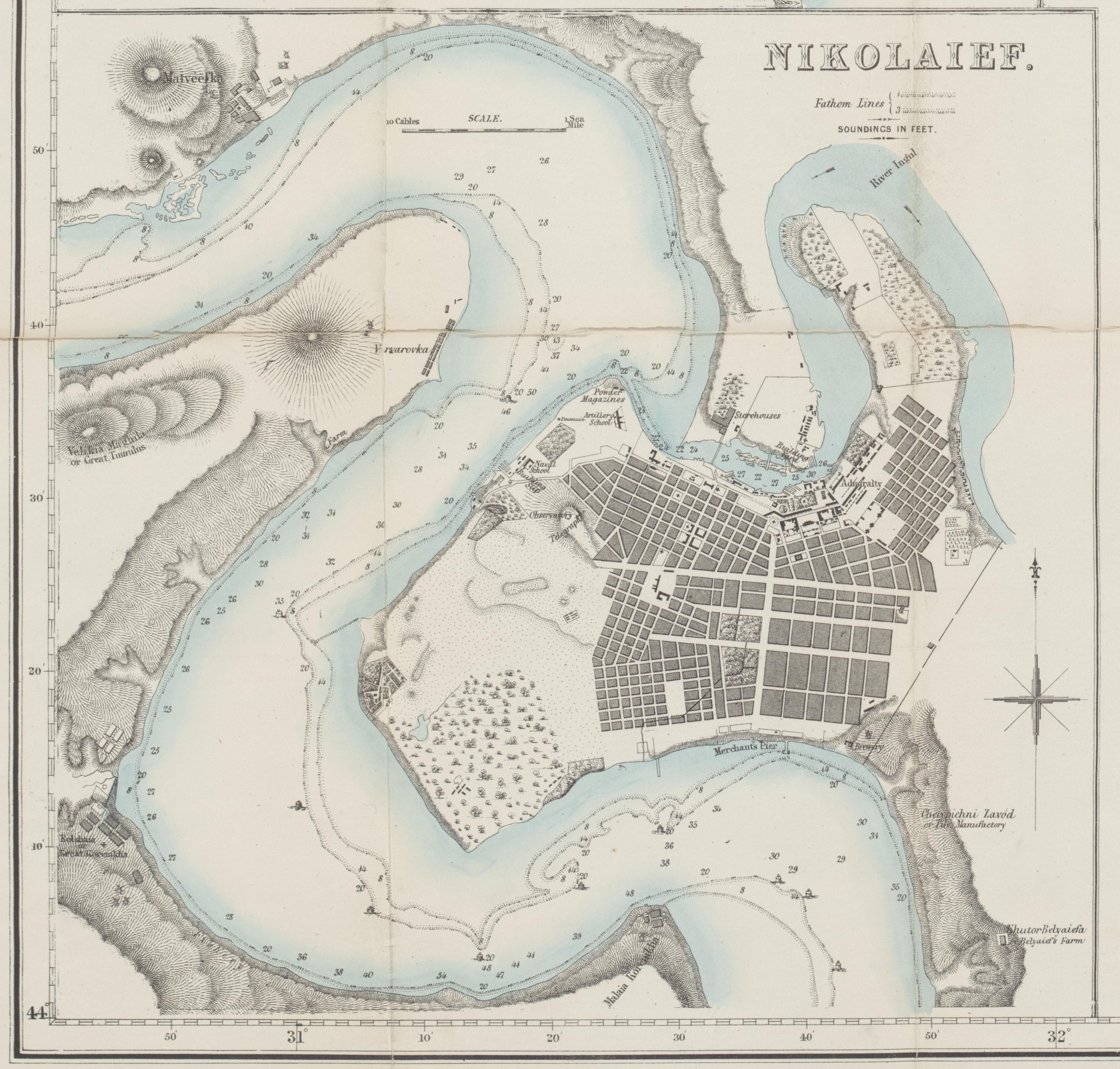
General plan of Nikolaev, 1855.

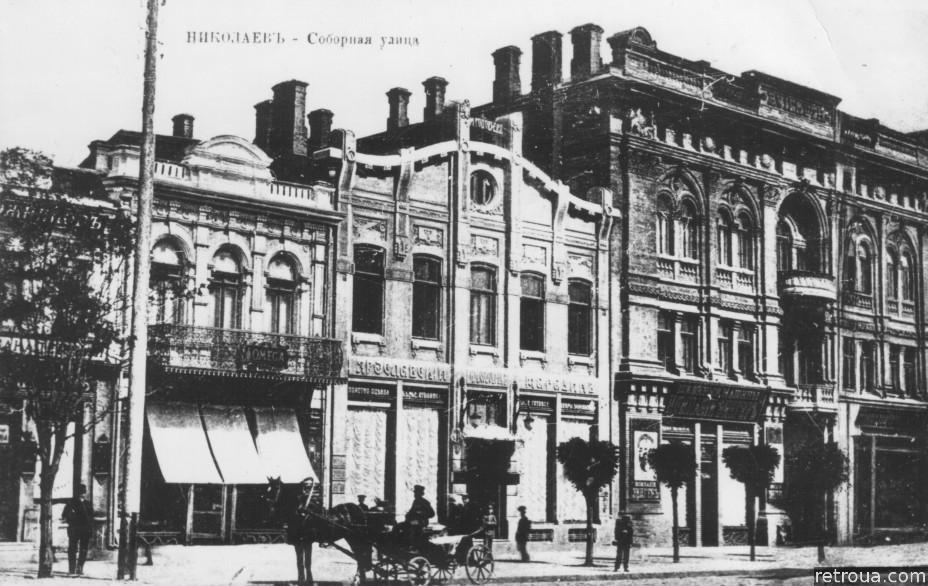
Soborna Street in Nikolaev, 1899.

After the devastation in the wake of the end of the war, control of Nikolaev passed on to Bogdan Fon-Glazenap in 1860. After Glazenap arrived in the city, he immediately ordered his subordinate, Yakov Uharin, to help draft a plan for the city's recovery, with the general view that the city should be reopened to foreigners and international trade. Uharin, acting on behalf of Glazenap, then recommended that the port of Nikolaev become a commercial port open to foreign vessels. Glazenap approved of this, and on 1 June 1862, by an imperial decree of Alexander II, this came into fruition. Very quickly, the port gained vast importance in the empire, ranking only behind St. Petersburg and Odessa, with 23 million poods of exports passing through the port at its height. This also led to a population surge, and so in 1862 both a trade school for work in the navy was opened and a classical gymnasium for men. In addition, in 1864, Konstantin Konstantinov led the construction of a new rocket factory in the city, which was followed up the city's first newspaper in 1864, known as Nikolaevsky Vestnik. Some of the new inhabitants during this time after the city was opened up to foreigners again included many people from the Balkans, such as Bulgarians, Serbians, and Montenegrins, with a dedicated boarding school opening up for these communities. The Jewish community also returned, starting in 1859, when a new imperial decree permitted them to resettle after all Jews were expelled from the city in 1829.

After the signing of the Treaty of London in 1871, in which most of the concessions placed on Russia in 1856 were reversed, allowing the admiralty to return to Nikolaev. In lieu of this, Nikolai Arkas replaced Glazenap as governor later that spring. Under his tenure, most of the admiralty was reconstructed with the addition of new workshops for it also, although civilian infrastructure was neglected by Arkas. Only two streets in the entirety of Nikolaev were paved, few areas had gas lamps, and labour conditions were especially harsh. This led to regular labour strikes against the admiralty, especially since foreigners from St. Petersburg were paid much more than people from Nikolaev while working in the shipyards. Nevertheless, a new railway was also opened during this time, connecting the city to Kharkov in 1873, which allowed further trade within Ukraine.

In 1882, Aleksey Peshchurov became military governor of Nikolaev. Under Peshchurov, more technically advanced ships were launched from Nikolaev's ports, such as the Russian battleship Ekaterina II, and a telephone network was constructed in November 1889 to the more important areas of Nikolaev. Into the 1890s, Nikolaev was still experiencing heavy industrialisation, with Westerners founding the Franco-Belgian "Shipyards and Foundry Works" and the "Black Sea Mechanical and Foundry Works" (these would eventually merge together in 1907 to form the Black Sea Shipyard). This industrialisation also led to the rise of labour movements, such as a Tolstoyan movement circle that was founded in the city in 1892 and a workers' circle in the spring of 1897 known as the "Union of Nikolaev Workers" (which was, notably, led by Leon Trotsky). Nikolai Kopytov, the governor, harshly cracked down on these circles, with Kopytov exiling those suspected to Siberia, including Trotsky. On 22 May 1899, after over a century of Nikolaev being ruled under a military governship, this was abolished when the Black Sea Fleet headquarters were formally moved to Sevastopol. In its place, the city became a city administration, although it retained being a Supernumerary town, so de jure it was not part of Kherson Governorate.

==== Pogrom of 1899 ====
From 19 to 21 April 1899, during the celebration of Orthodox Easter, a pogrom started to attack the Jewish residents residing in the city. At the time, there were around 30,000. A crowd of around 5,000 residents gathered at Soborna Street, most of whom were labourers brought in from Oryol. In advance, Jewish homes were already marked on the doors with chalk. Thus, the crowd attacked these marked homes, smashing through the windows and breaking in, and also looting suspected Jewish shops. Some of the homes that were attacked professed that they were Christian, not Jewish, to be spared. On 21 April, especially, many Jewish areas were entirely looted, with other people from villages surrounding Nikolaev coming to join in. Eventually, on that night, the Cossacks that were assigned to protect Nikolaev stopped the crowds, and Kopytov put the city under higher security and banned all gatherings in response. In total, nearly 300,000 rubles in damage was done to Jewish residence, and 79 properties were destroyed.

=== Early 1900s ===
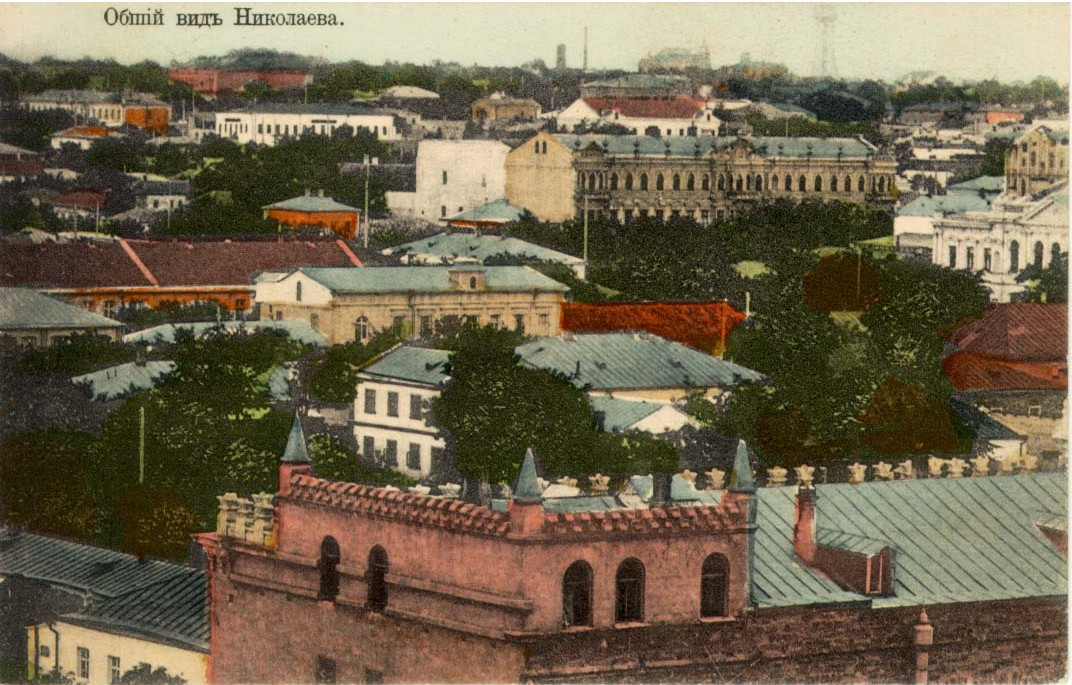
Nikolaev on a postcard c. early 1900s, at least before 1917.

In 1900, at the turn of the century, the first mayor of the city was appointed, Karl Tikotsky. Over the next few years prior to the Russian Civil War, the city would rapidly go through seven different mayors. However, with the end of military governorship, Nikolaev did experience rapid civic growth in comparison to previous decades. In 1902, the first power station providing electricity to houses and streets was installed in Nikolaev, and the first higher education institute in the city, Nikolaev Industrial Technical School, was opened. In 1907, a new rail line was opened linking Nikolaev to Kherson, which was followed up by a line from Nikolaev to Odessa in 1914 and to Snigirevka in 1915. A Prosvita was also founded alongside new museums, such as The V. V. Vereshchagin Mykolaiv Art Museum. However, the admiralty shipyard would also be abandoned by the government as it lacked the funds to carry on with the shipyard, with the last state-built Russian battleship Evstafi being laid in 1911. In 1912, the admiralty was privatised, becoming the Russian Shipbuilding Society (Russud), which itself was part of Baltic Works. The first significant order that the newly privatised Russud got was the Russian battleship Imperatritsa Mariya, which was the lead ship of a class of the first dreadnoughts built for the Black Sea Fleet.

With the outbreak of World War One, the city's newspapers adopted a heavily patriotic stance, although anti-war strikes continued to regularly happen. In January 1916, one of the largest strikes in the Russian Empire at the time of the war hit, with more than 12,000 shipyard workers revolting. Nevertheless, the industrial output of the city rapidly grew to supply the war effort, with more than 1,788,541 tons of exports being produced by 21,324 workers in just a year.

==== 1905 Revolution ====
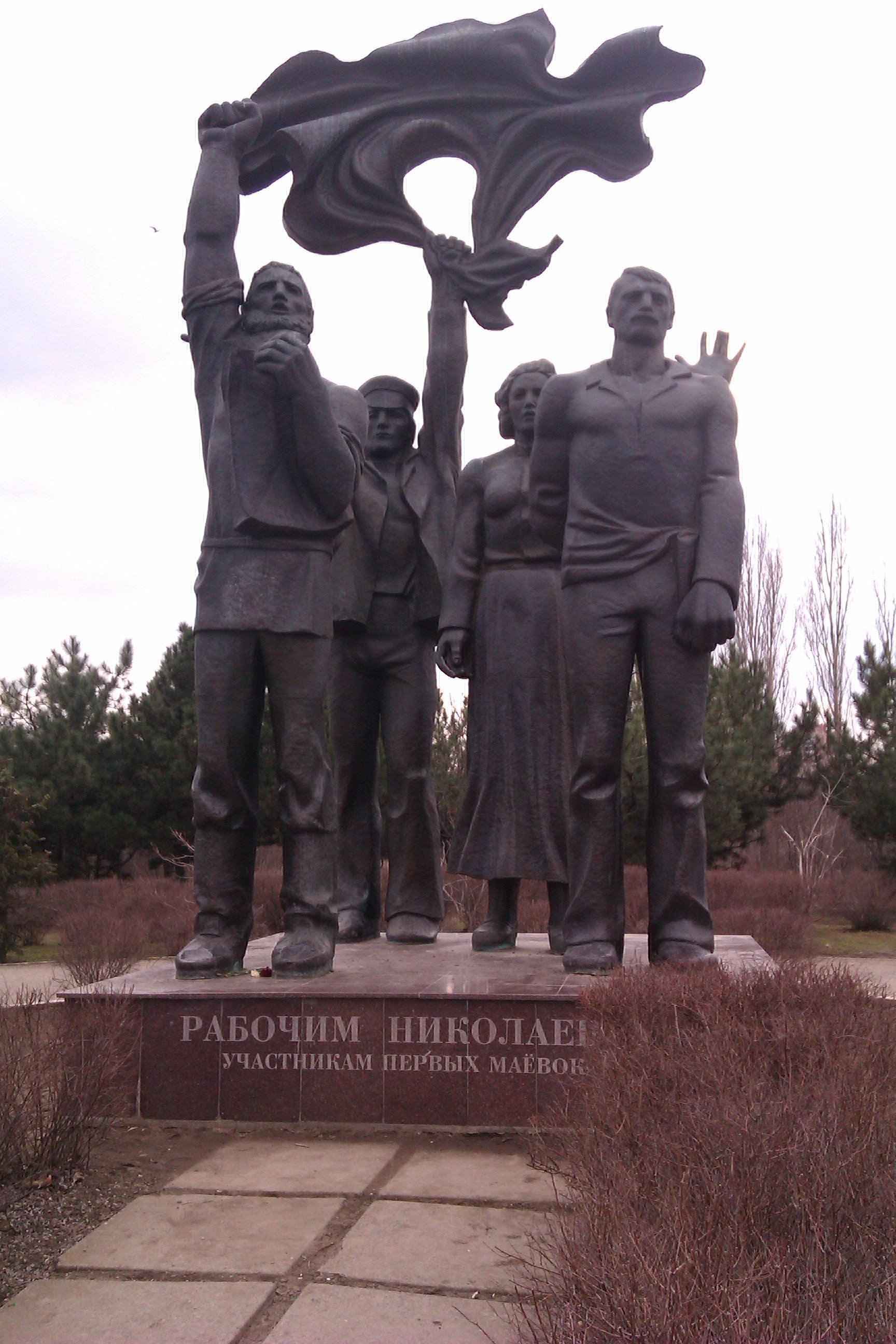
Monument to the first worker rallies

By the early 1900s, Nikolaev already had its own chapter of RSDRP, which began operating in late 1901. The first large-scale protest organised was from 21 to 23 July 1903, with 2,000 workers marching on Soborna Street to protest wages and workday hours, leading to the arrest of 90. Bloody Sunday, which marked the start of the Russian Revolution of 1905, however, was initially met very quietly in the city as many would-be social organisers were quickly arrested by the police to prevent protests. It wasn't until February 1905 when Nikolaev would finally react, beginning with the Black Sea Shipyard, and spreading across the city. The longest strike was from 23 February to 17 March 1905, with workers gathering daily in the streets. Around 2,000 workers also gathered on May Day that year, with the Bolsheviks agitating the events by issuing more than 9,000 leaflets to spur the city. In June, the Black Sea Shipyard protested once again, leading to violent clashes with police, with an assassination attempt being made on the life of police chief Ivanov on 15 June via a bomb although it missed. In response, martial law was declared in Nikolaev, and a thousand people were arrested or exiled.

In the autumn, the situation dramatically worsened with the signing of the October Manifesto, as another pogrom (the first since 1899) would begin by right-wing groups who opposed the signing. The pogrom lasted from 18 October to 21 October 1905, once again destroying the community and the city was put under a higher state of siege. In response, the revolutionaries formed a "people's militia", and began distributing over 129 leaflets - most notably "To All Workers of Nikolaev" and "The Last Card of Tsarism and Society's Task". It was, in fact, major enough that the Ministry of Internal Affairs flagged many Nikolaev periodicals as having a wider effect on fueling strikes within Ukraine. This was followed by the formation of the Nikolaev Soviet on 20 November. The new Soviet was riddled with problems, though, lacking any clear strategy or unity besides general insurrection planning. On 13 December, they started a new strike, but the Soviet was disbanded in the middle of the strike in response to the Moscow uprising of 1905 which saw a government victory. On 23 December, the government of Nikolaev crushed any remaining revolutionary sentiment via seizures and arrests, which would continue well into January 1906.

== Soviet era ==
=== Russian Civil War ===
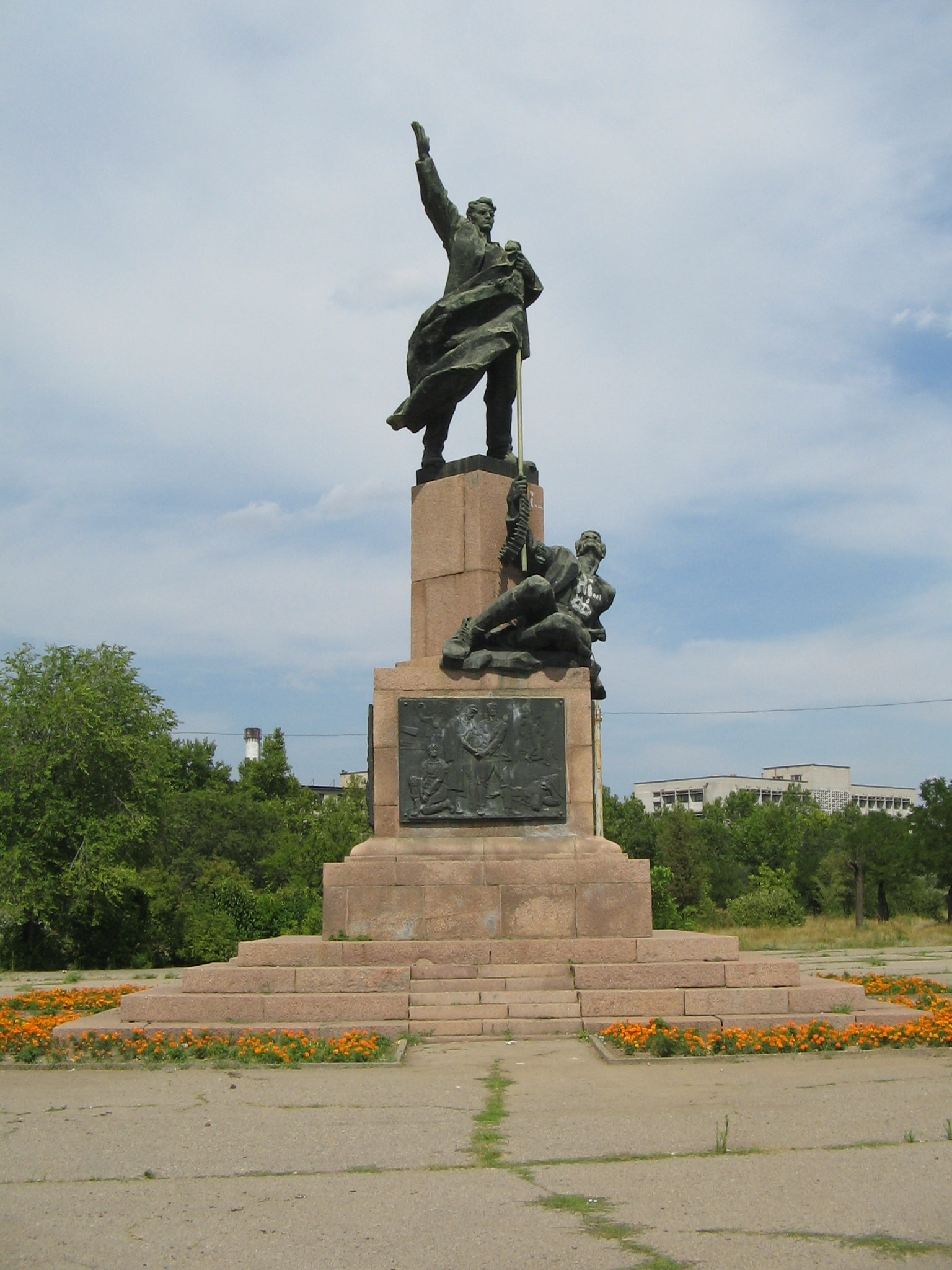
Monument to the establishment of Soviet power

==== 1917 ====
News of the February Revolution, which overthrew the monarchy, reached Nikolaev by 1 March 1917, which led to mass chaos as the police were dissolved and the Soviet was once again proclaimed. The Soviet formed both a Council of Workers' Deputies and a Council of Military Deputies, which merged in April to make the Council of Workers' and Military Deputies, meeting at Nikolska Street. They, however, for the time being still worked with the other RSDRP factions, such as the Mensheviks, while the shipyards modified work days. In May, a people's militia affiliated with the Socialists was formed to establish order and replace the dissolved police, and trade unions were born such as the Metalworkers' Union (which had a militant stance). However, unity would not last long as on 18 June the Bolsheviks, in a rally in Nikolaev, proclaimed that they would not follow the Provisional Government, and also denounced the Mensheviks and the Socialist Revolutionary Party (SRs) as traitors. Thus, in August, the Bolsheviks created they own independent committee, while the August elections for the city duma were dominated by the SRs and Social Democrats. In response to the Kornilov affair shortly thereafter, the stationed 1st Pontoon Battalion demanded that all power pass to the Bolsheviks and for an end to World War I. This would come into fruition not even a month later with the October Revolution, specifically, in Nikolaev, many Red Guard units were working (around 650 workers were members of the units), declaring the Bolsheviks the "highest power" which the city duma of the SRs sharply condemned.

In November, however, with the start of the Russian Civil War and the proclamation of the Ukrainian People's Republic (which was de jure autonomous per the Third Universal) both the Council of Workers' and Military Deputies and the city duma threw their support behind the UPR as a "regional authority". The Jewish faction in the duma in particular was pleased with this as they believed that this would guarantee minority rights. The Bolsheviks quickly realised, though, that the Ukrainians did not intend to support the Bolsheviks and the Sovnarkom, and so in December Nikolaev's Red Guard units denounced the UPR and elected their own Military-Revolutionary Committee. Pravda, in its reports, would later say Nikolaev was both unique and a struggle because at the time the city supported Ukrainian nationalism. Nevertheless, the initial city duma that was established in December had the two sides working together, with 6 seats each for the Ukrainians and Bolsheviks.

==== 1918 ====
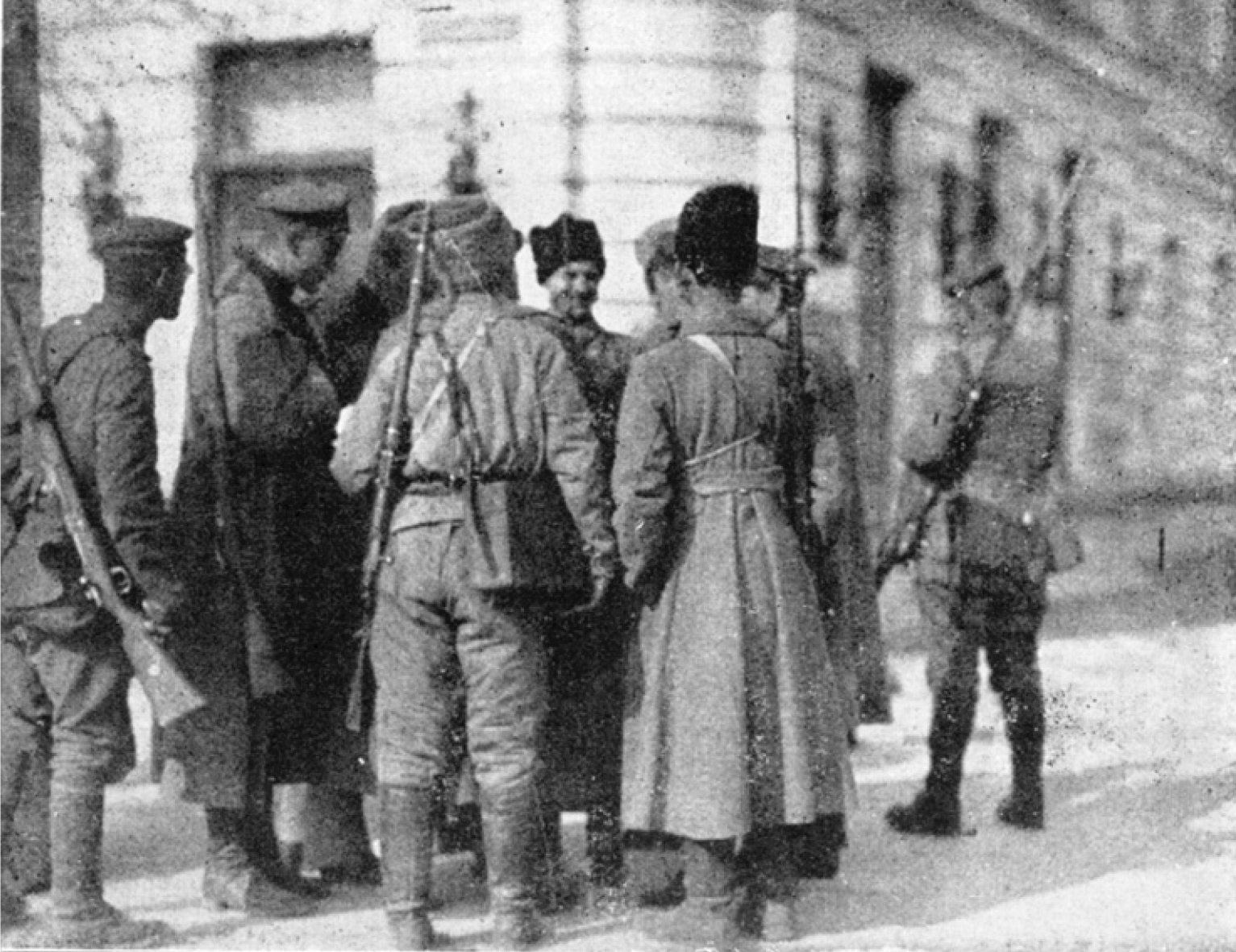
March 1918 Uprising in Nikolaev

On 14 January 1918, the Bolsheviks formally seized all power in the city from the Ukrainians, although this was not supported city-wide and led to mass demonstrations calling for an end to the Bolsheviks. The Ukrainians under K. Boichuk, in response, announced their own "Revolutionary Ukrainian Staff" and an organisation of Free Cossacks. Tensions heightened severely at the end of the month when the Ukrainians and Red Guards clashed, leaving the commander of the Red Guard dead, leading the Bolsheviks to more firmly establish their power by 24 January 1918. In March 1918, the Central Powers following the Treaty of Brest-Litovsk which saw the Bolsheviks denounce their claims to Ukraine, began moving to retake Nikolaev. A combined Imperial German Army and Austro-Hungarian Army troops entered Nikolaev and started occupying the city on 17 March 1918. De jure the city was part of the Ukrainian People's Republic, although it was de facto an Austro-German protectorate under the command of Hermann von Eichhorn. After beginning their occupation, the Austro-Germans shut down the shipyards, dismissing over 10,000 workers, and also shutting down all newspapers. From 22 to 25 March, the Bolsheviks, who promised they would defend Nikolaev by any means necessary, including via dictatorship, led an uprising against the occupation. In these three days of uprisings, more than 2,000 were killed in the city. The uprising was quickly and brutally defeated. In the spring, the Ukrainian State de jure toook control from the UPR, with the ataman Cherepanov dissolving the occupation duma. Under Cherepanov, many RSDRP and Bolshevik members were arrested, although the Bolsheviks continued to operate underground in very difficult conditions with no senior members by attempting to start agitations. In December, with the defeat of the Central Powers in World War I, the Austro-Germans left Nikolaev on 11 December. Within a day, the troops of ataman Nykyfor Hryhoriv (who was at this time loyal to the Ukrainian Directory) entered the city, solidifying UPR control in the city, although the Hetmanate surrendered power to the French-Greeks in early January following the Southern Russia intervention.

==== 1919 ====
Nykyfor Hryhoriv in 1919

Hryhoriv, however, switched sides secretly in January 1919 to the Bolsheviks after some of the German forces refused to leave Nikolaev and with the start of the successful Soviet invasion of Ukraine. Hryhoriv secretly met with Bolshevik commander Vladimir Antonov-Ovseenko in person in February, who ordered him to position his troops as part of the 1st Zadneprovsk Ukrainian Soviet Division out of Nikolaev and a hundred miles north in an attempt to weaken him, since he did not trust him, which Hryhoriv disobeyed. He instead wanted to take full Bolshevik control of the cities of Kherson and Nikolaev himself, with, at the time, 15,000 German troops remaining in Nikolaev after being stranded due to the war. These troops were part of the 15th Landwehr Division, and were described as having very low morale and fighting ability, with some even being openly sympathetic to the Bolsheviks, and any political authority in Nikolaev was severely fractured and dysfunctional. The city was also de jure under the guardianship of the French. In March, Hryhoriv issued his own ultimatum, calling the Germans to leave or die, although Antonov-Ovseenko overruled the telegram, calling it "stupid" to go into a heavily fortified city and to instead engage at Kherson. Indeed, by 2 March, a Greek force of 3,000 had already come to Nikolaev to back the Germans up. Hryhoriv once again disobeyed him on 5 March, sending a note to the duma of Nikolaev saying his forces would attack on 7 March. The delegation of Bolsheviks reacted very fearfully to this plan, saying it would be a blood bath if he started the battle then and that the French would likely intervene. In fact, the Bolsheviks under Rappo said that the situation was actually decent at the time since the Germans were demoralised and would likely leave soon.

On 7 March, Hryhoriv continued on, but encountered fierce German and French resistance in Nikolaev, although by the night Hryhoriv withdrew after the Bolsheviks begged him to. On 11 March, the German troops signaled that they would surrender and transfer their arms to the Bolsheviks and not the French, with the French agreeing to this if they would disable the radio station in Nikolaev. The station was not disabled, and so the French threatened to start shelling the city with a nearby cruiser, with the partisan Ryappo in turn threatening to shell the cruiser in response with German guns, leading the standoff to stop. Thus, the French and Greeks announced they would leave alongside the Germans, but Hryhoriv, who was angry that he could not take Nikolaev itself, took Nikolaev by force on 12 March. He was joined in the offensive by members of the 1st Zadneprovsk Ukrainian Soviet Division, although in later Soviet-era sources Hryhoriv's role in the city's capture would be glossed over and given entirely to the Soviet division.

After the Bolsheviks captured the city, they ordered a special naval commission to help manage the ports of Nikolaev and its defense. Shortly after this, Vladimir Lenin telegrammed the Sovnarkom, starting the mobilisation of workers in larger cities, including Nikolaev, to help on the front within two weeks, and the Nikolaev factories were also all nationalised. To help with the defense of Nikolaev against the White movement, a detachment was sent to the city, and communists from England were brought in to form a 200-strong "International Detachment". On 13 May, in response to Hryhoriv's published Universal where he called for a "Soviet Ukraine without communists", the Hryhoriv Uprising in Nikolaev began. At first, Hryhoriv in a telegram told Antonov that he wanted to take Nikolaev and Kherson without fighting and that the Bolsheviks could have Odessa, but Antonov flatly refused. A mutiny of sailors affiliated with the anarchist movement began after Hryhoriv falsely claimed that workers in Nikolaev were killing communists, with the sailors quickly taking power and arresting the Soviets. Nestor Makhno's forces also joined to help the uprising. The city was officially taken on 24 May when the Bolsheviks left the city to retreat to Odessa. Anarchist control would be very quickly subdued starting on 26 May, and by 27 May the city was retaken by the Red Army detachment in Odessa together with workers in Nikolaev, while Hryhoriv fled with Makhno.

Throughout the summer, the White movement inched closer to Nikolaev after taking the Donbas. Starting on 1 July, all able-bodied workers were mobilised, daily military drills began, and a Council of People's Defense was established. However, this did not deter anything, as on 4 August the 58th Red Army Division quickly abandoned Nikolaev, and on the following day the Whites took the city. During this time, the Boolsheviks once again went underground to aid Red Guardsmen, setting up three district cells. On 16 November, some partisans attempted to capture the city in a surprise attack, but the Whites were forewarned and all members were captured, with some being publicly hanged. Four days later, on 20 November, Yakov Slashchov arrived in the city and ordered the execution of 61 more prisoners. The prisoners were also killed publicly, being shot on the square in front of Russud, with the bodies of the executed lying out in the streets to suppress insurrection.

==== 1920 ====
In January 1920, the front held by the Whites began collapsing, and this, combined with rumours of both an insurgency and an approach by the Red Army, led the Whites to begin an evacuation of the city. The Whites finally retreated on 18 January 1920, with the Bolsheviks taking the city for the fourth time on either 20 January 1920 under the 41st Division of A. M. Osadchy. After retaking the city, the Bolsheviks initially put it under the Ukrainian SSR of the Kherson Governorate, of which it was the administrative centre, not Kherson, while Odessa was split off into its own governorate. However, the city was in effective economic ruin due to how many times power switched. This led to Subbotniks being established starting on 28 March, with thousands gathering to do so for the rest of 1920. The first ship made in Nikolaev under full control of the Soviets was Elpidifor No. 415, which not even a year later, during the Action of 9 January 1921 was destroyed by the French.

Later that summer, Nikolaev was divided into two districts (later corrected into three). In September, the Cheka allegedly uncovered a conspiracy of underground Whites that were attempting to overthrow the Soviets, which led to the arrest of more than 400. By the end of 1920, the city had hit 100,000 people, with the population standing at 108,777.

==== Maps ====
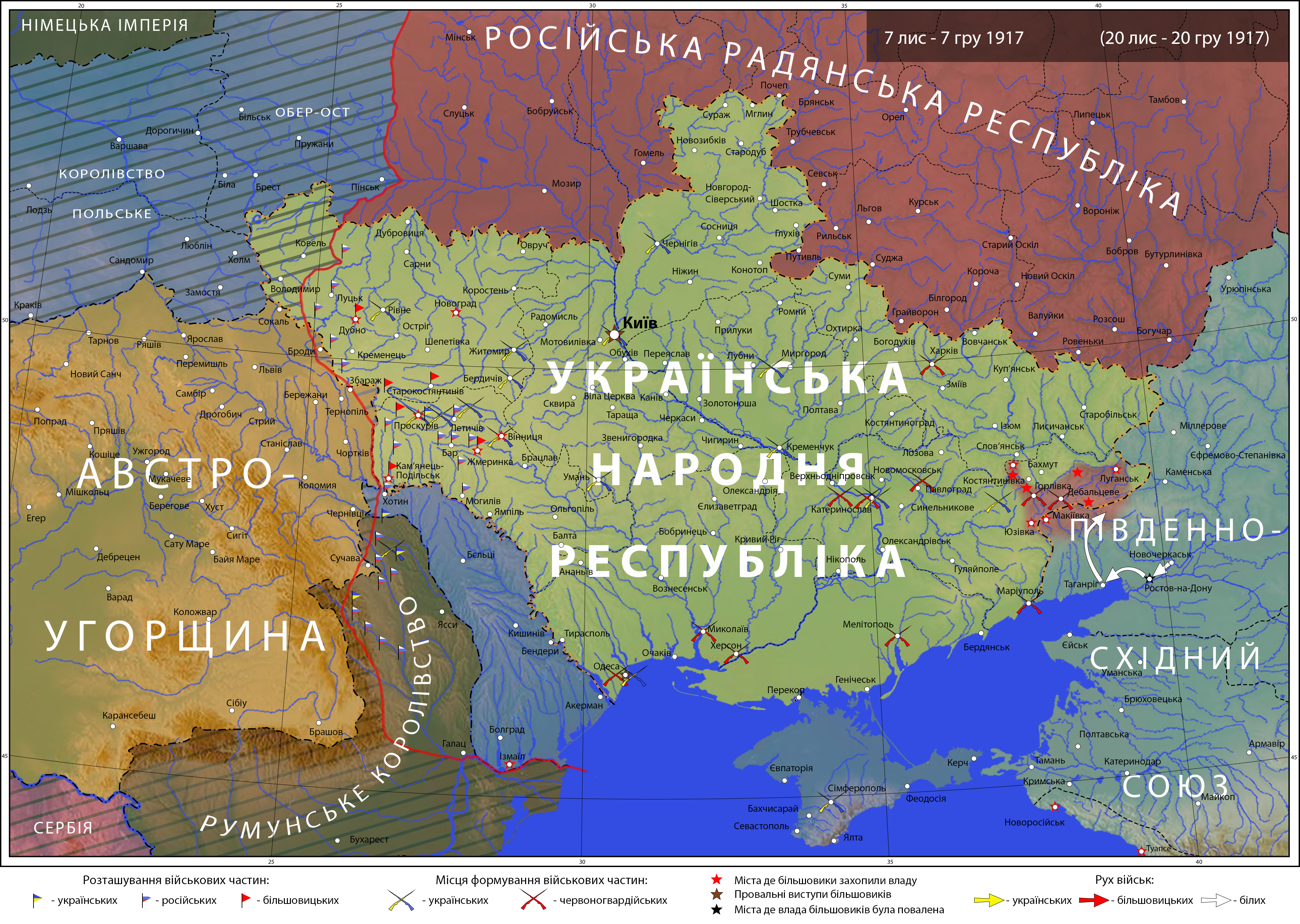
Situation in Ukraine from November to December 1917. The UPR has taken control of Nikolaev, although it is at the site of a battle.

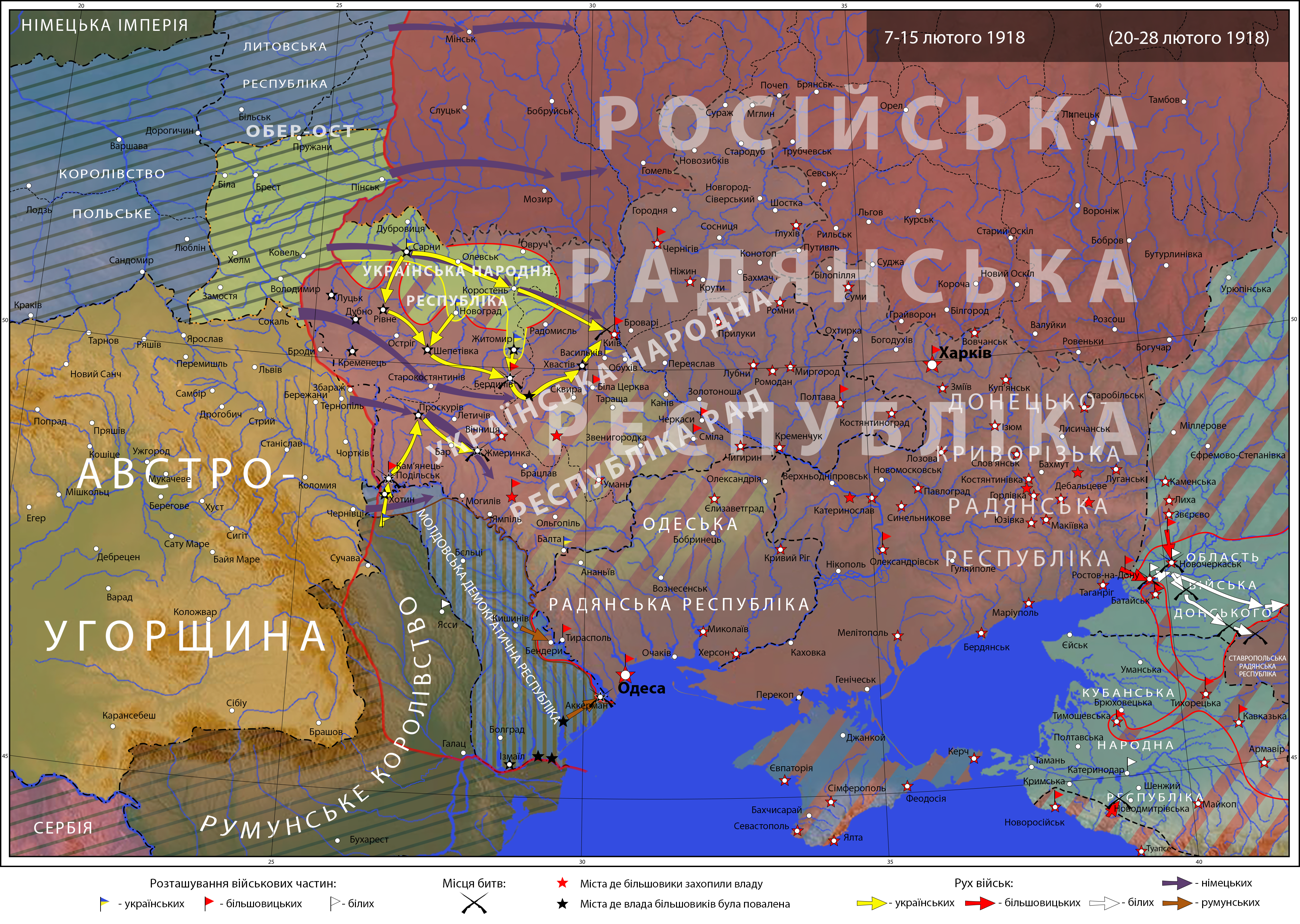
Situation in Ukraine in late February 1918. The Bolsheviks have taken Nikolaev.

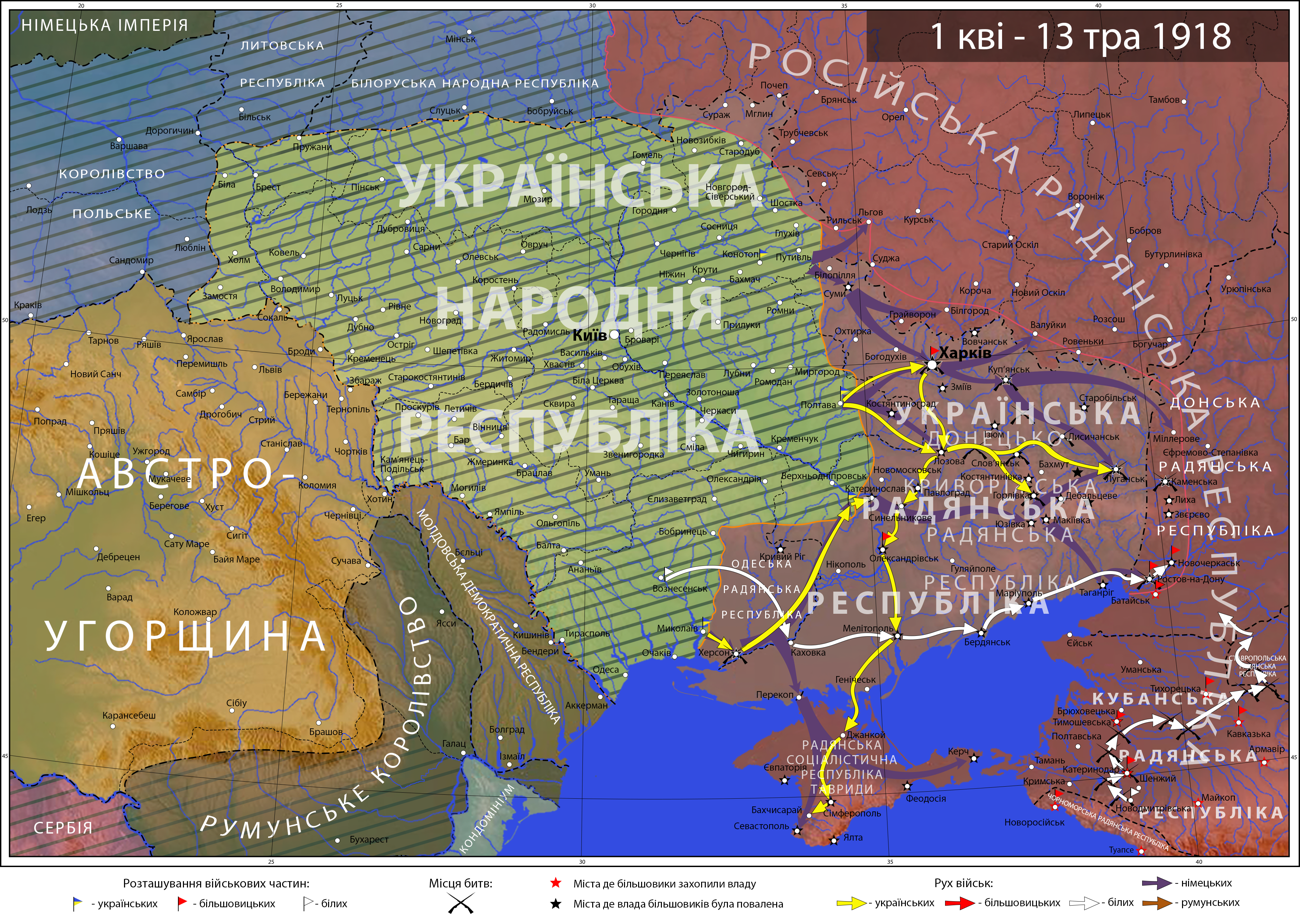
Situation in Ukraine in April 1918. The UPR, together with the Central Powers, retake Nikolaev.

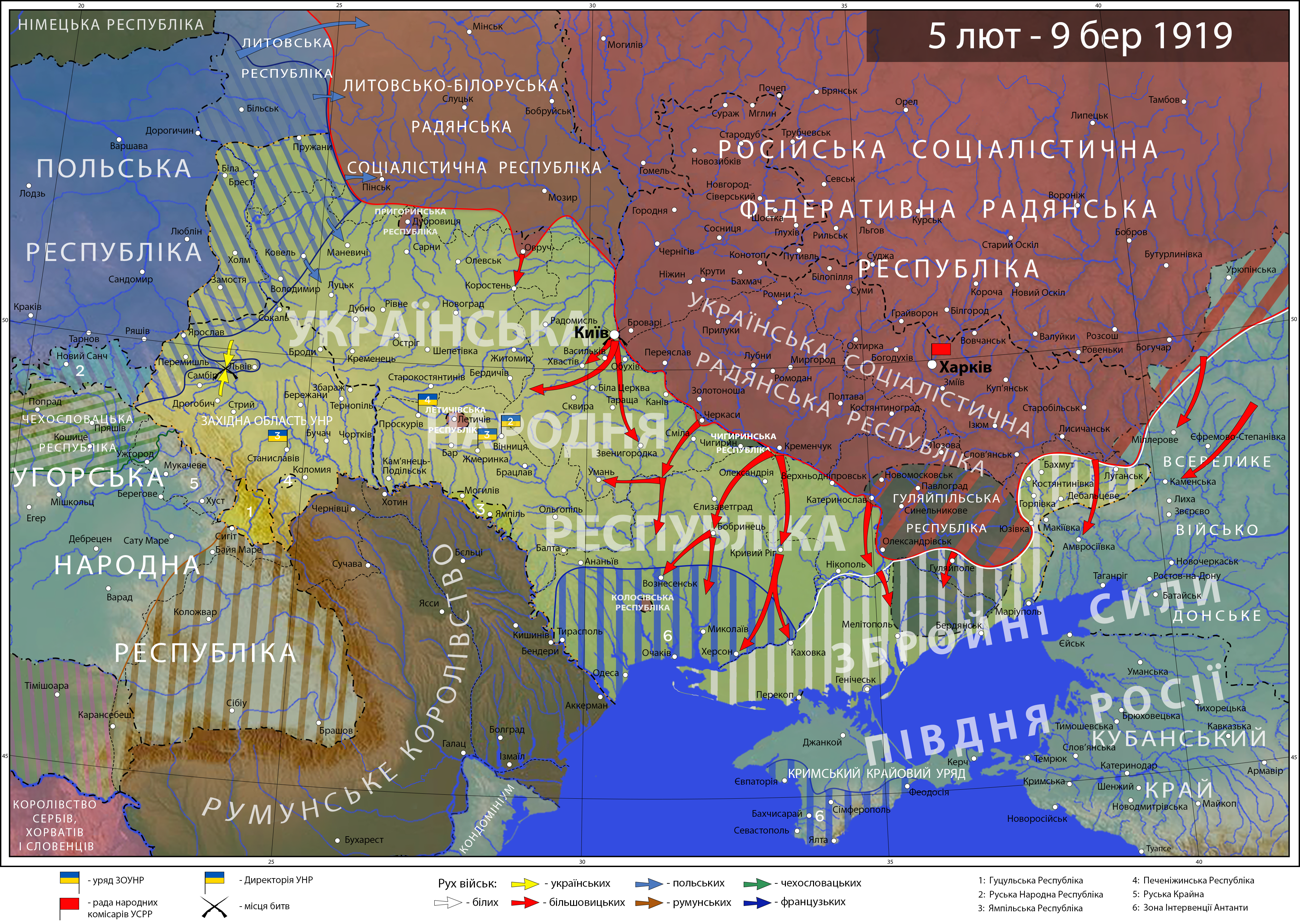
Situation in January 1919. After the Central Powers troops retreated following their defeat in World War I, French troops entered the city.

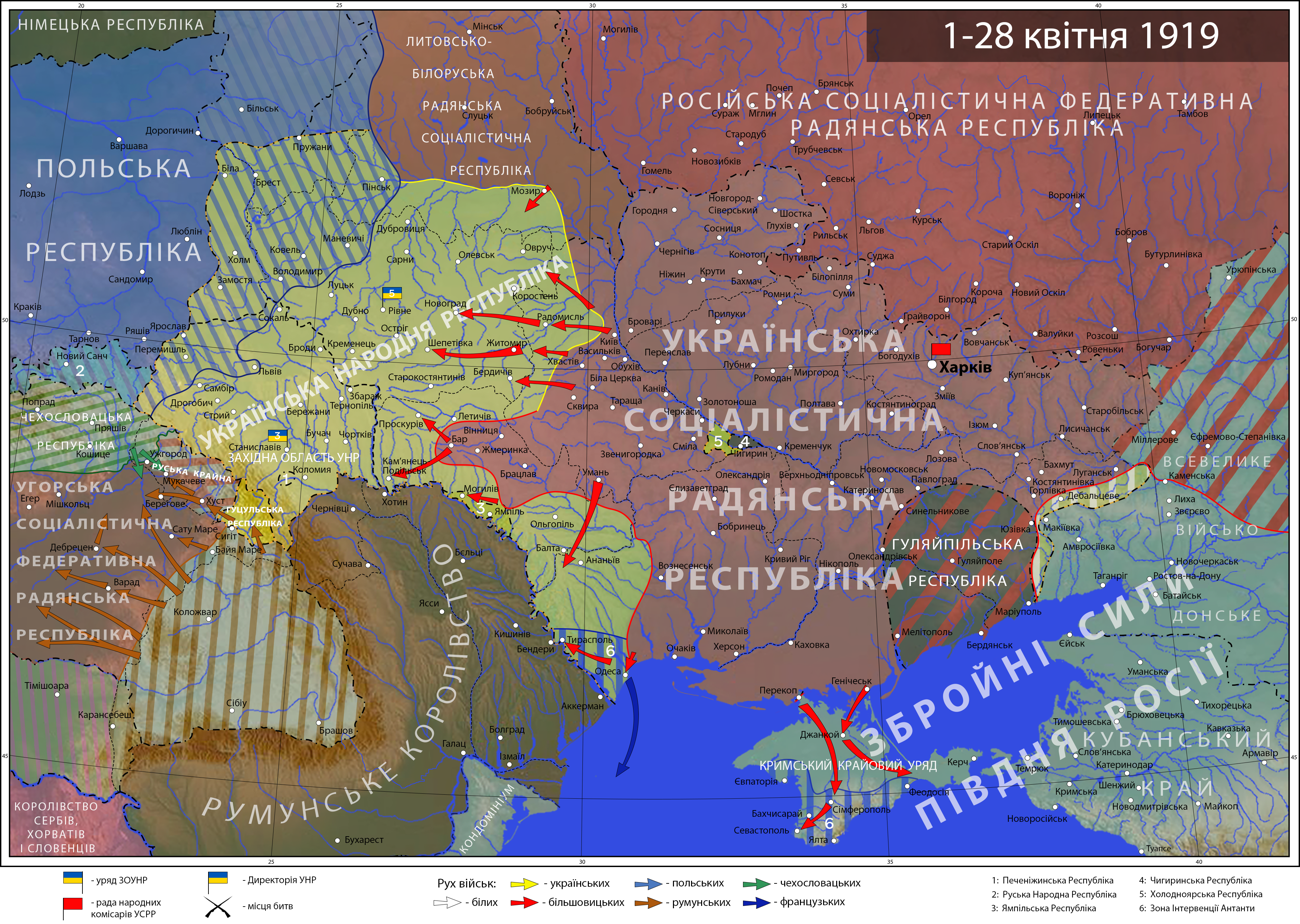
Situation in early April 1919. The Bolsheviks, together with Nykyfor Hryhoriv, recapture the city.

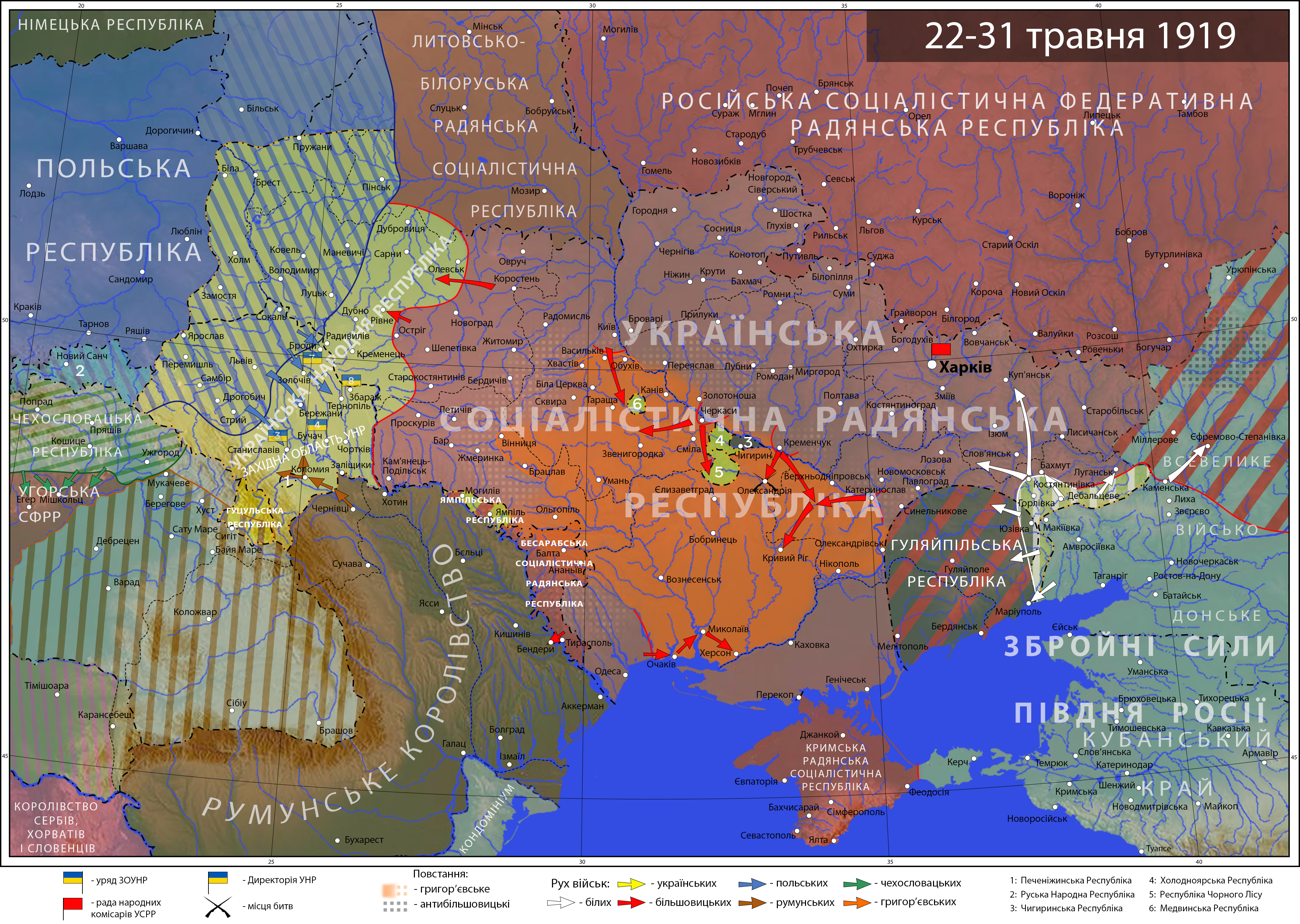
Situation in May 1919. Nykyfor Hryhoriv turns on the Bolsheviks and leads a peasant uprising known as the Hryhoriv Uprising, although the uprising's control would only ever be brief.

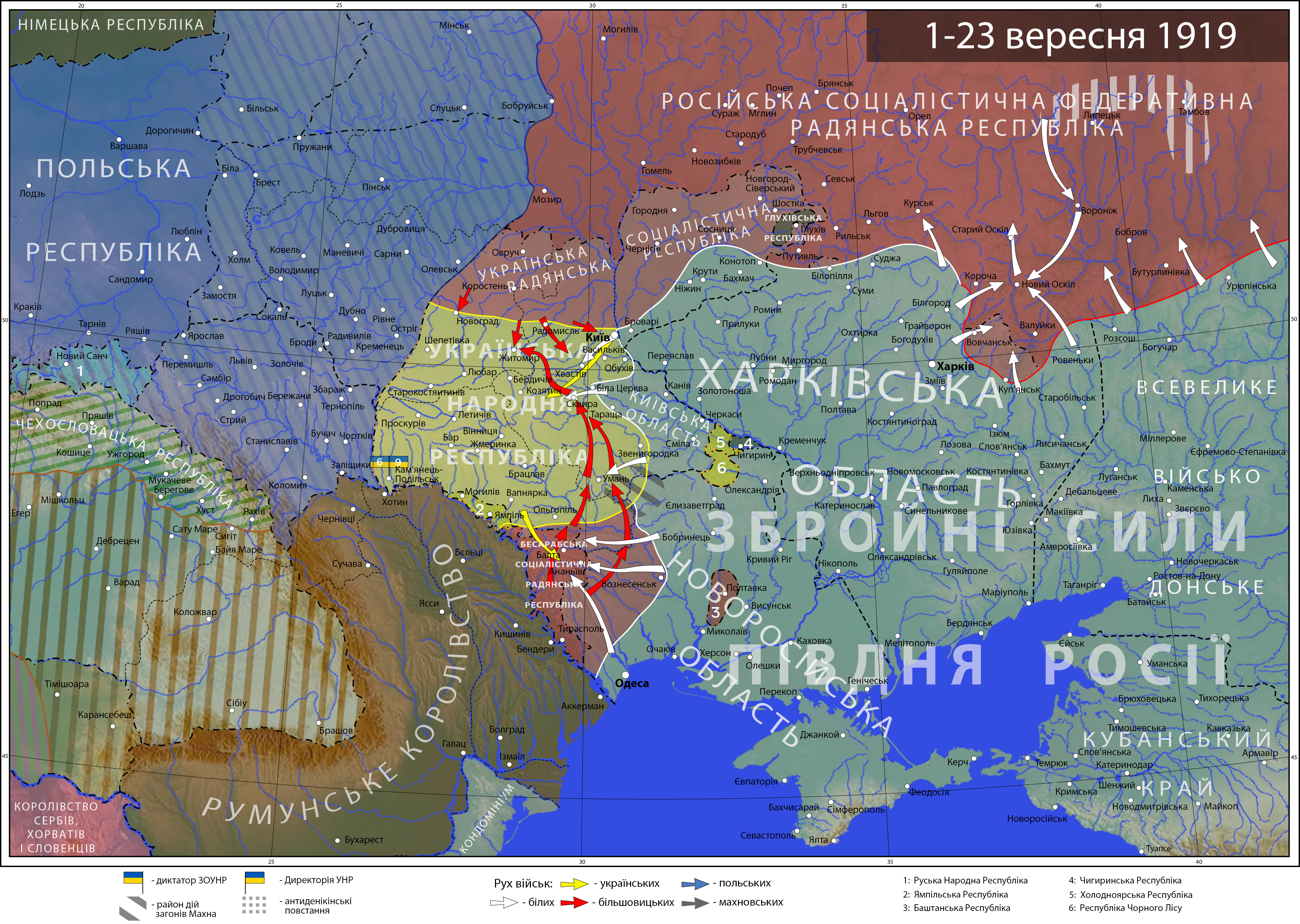
Situation in September 1919. The White movement begins an offensive, seizing control of the city from the Bolsheviks, although nearby the pro-Soviet Bashtanka Republic gains a foothold.

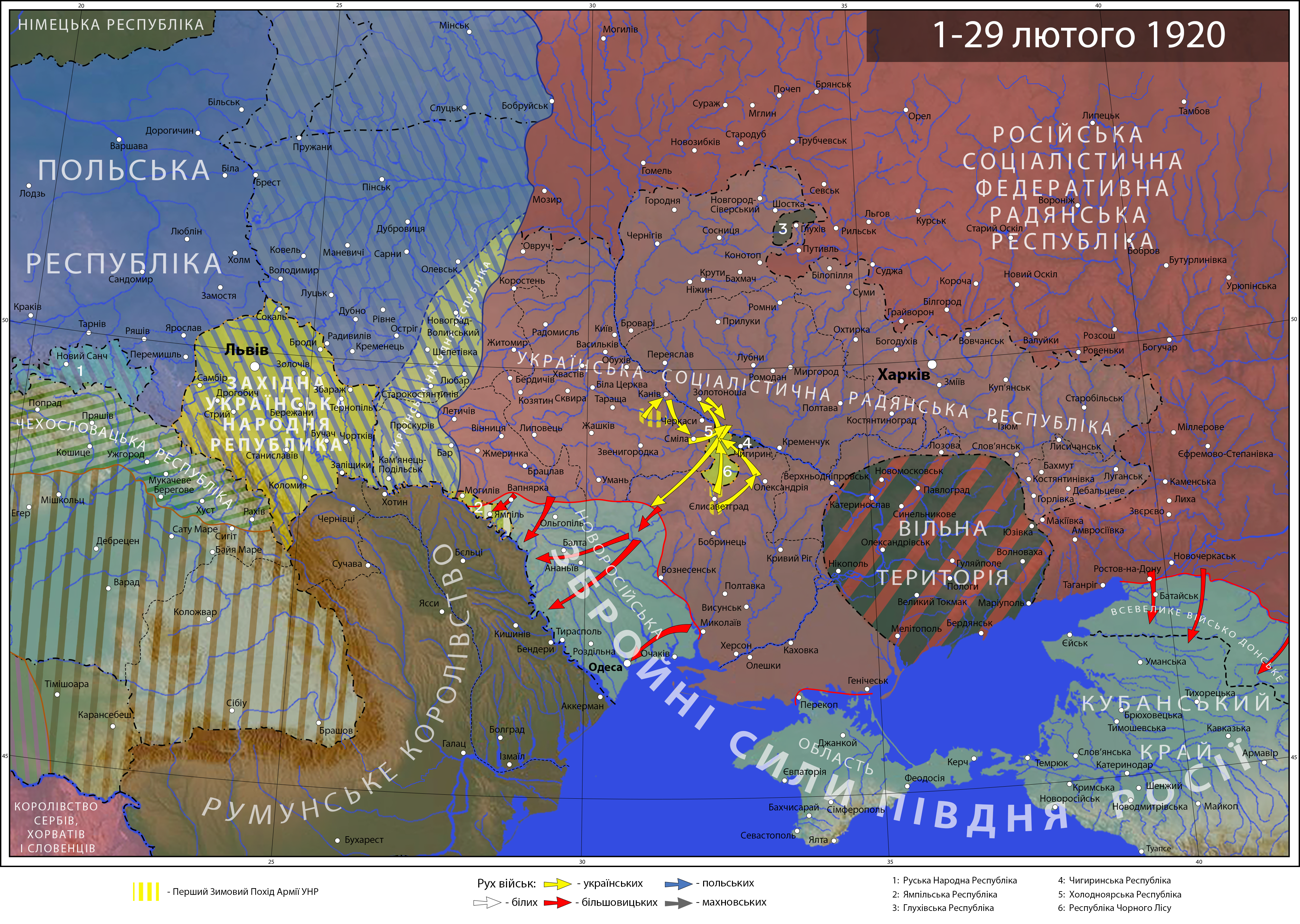
Situation in February 1920. The Bolsheviks have seized power in Nikolaev for the last time.

=== Interwar period ===
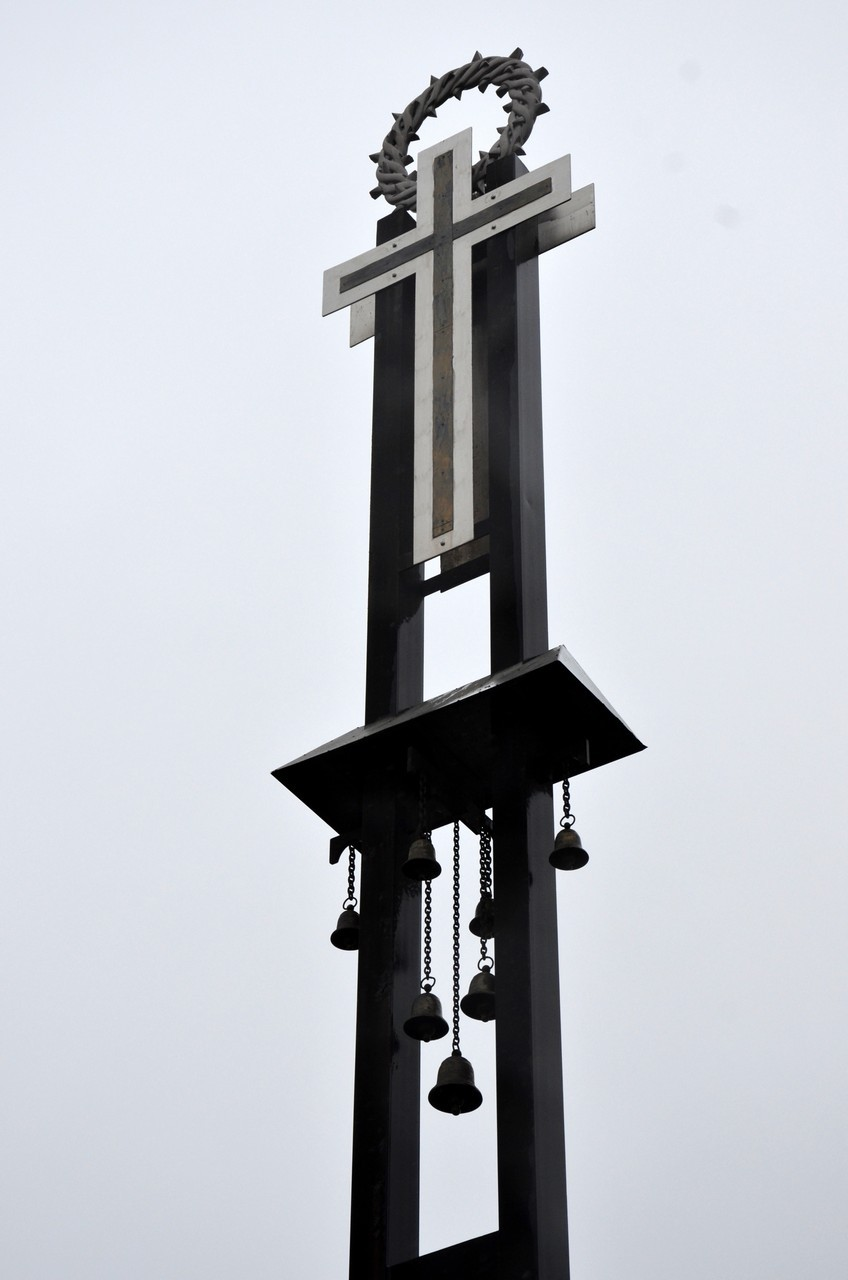
Memorial to victims of the Holodomor

On 6 January 1921, the administrative centre of Kherson Governorate was moved to Nikolaev due to most of the administrative bodies being located within the city, and the governorate was formally renamed to Nikolaev Governorate. However, on 15 October 1922 the Nikolaev Governorate was liquidated, and it was unified together with the Odessa Okruha, with the administrative centre being in Odessa. Okruhas were abolished in 1930, and the city then became initially part of Odesa Oblast until 1937 when Nikolaev Oblast, with its administrative centre in Nikolaev, was created.

During this time, many workers in the factories in Nikolaev to restore the Black Sea Fleet after the end of the war, and work was done on restoring the economy of the city. By 6 November, in a report by the KP(b)U, it was said that the city was still in disarray and that the fulfillment of orders was not going well, with difficulties in acquiring materials and not enough "politically conscious communists" in factories at Nikolaev. Due to this, more than 50 worker-communists were brought in to Nikolaev to assist with the plants. In 1922, for their work in the revival of the Soviet Navy, the city's workers were nevertheless awarded the Order of the Red Banner of Labour. Meanwhile, many in the city were still starving due to the ongoing 1921–1923 famine in Ukraine. By 1923, most of the water supply and tram systems had been repaired, while sovkhoz were re-organised alongside nurseries and parks, and a new worker's theatre was opened known as "The Fruits of Enlightenment".

==== Holodomor and Great Purge ====
By 1929, the Nikolaev okrug had numerous peasant households which were forced under grain quotas to produce an excessive amount of grain, which led to confiscation of foodstuffs. The wider effects in the region became more well-known when a cashier on Khersonka Street, Serafim Shestochenko, was arrested in November 1932 after witnesses said that he had said people were dying of hunger while working on collective farms. Shestochenko was initially ordered to be executed, but he was later sent to the gulags before being posthumously rehabilitated in 1989.

Nikolaev was also mildly affected by the Great Purge, with most activity occurring prior to 1933 when the city's local party purged out 35% of its members, leading to party members being recruited from rural cells for the city. Victims of the purge in Nikolaev were sorted through by the NKVD by either being part of anti-Soviet parties, nationalist organisations, ethnic minorities, fascists, or so-called kulaks. Of these categories, most of the people affected in Nikolaev were classified as being members of ethnic minority cells. The first instance of this in Nikolaev was mostly against Poles, especially in the case of the fabricated "Polish Military Organisation", which the Soviets alleged was run from Warsaw by a Comintern member. The cell was said to be uncovered in 1937, leading to the executions in Nikolaev of many accused members, such as I.V. Ivanov, M.P. Tsvetayev, H.A. Oks, and T.I. Vdovychenko, even though many were not Polish. This was followed by another so-called cell of Poles, with nine being executed in Nikolaev for this. The second instance was of Lithuanians, who at the time were numerous in the city after emigrating as members of the "Society for Technical Assistance to Soviet Russia", and who had founded the cooperative "Litkoop". Nearly all accused were executed, including brick-factory director Charles Iodis, plant worker Josif Cheido, and watchman Anton Aleshkevich on charges of organising an espionage ring for a foreign intelligence service and passing on evidence at the 61 Communards shipyard.

=== World War II ===
Immediately after the start of Operation Barbarossa, rallies were held in Nikolaev against Nazi Germany, and the commissariat in Nikolaev began to accept requests to volunteer at the Eastern Front or join people's militias in the defense of the city. On 29 June, resolution no. 36 ordered that defensive preparations for Nikolaev needed to begin immediately, and that members of the population of Nikolaev would be mobilised to construct anti-tank ditches around the city. The general defense of the city was handed to Rear Admiral Ilya Kulishov and General Aleksey Matvienko. In the next few weeks, most of the important organisations in the city were dismantled and sent to other cities such as Sevastopol, Poti, and Batumi, with citizens of Nikolaev being sent via ship to these cities also. On 2 August, Naval Commissar Admiral N. Kuznetsov told the fleet leadership of Nikolaev that the Black Sea Fleet would not redirect resources to the city's protection, saying that Crimea needed to have its defenses and that personnel in the city could not leave, as evacuation was premature. However, the Germans under the 11th Army rapidly advanced in early August after this order, and by 12 August members of the Black Sea Fleet were redeployed to the Kinburn Spit to strengthen the defense of the northwestern sector near the Danube.

==== Battle for Nikolaev ====
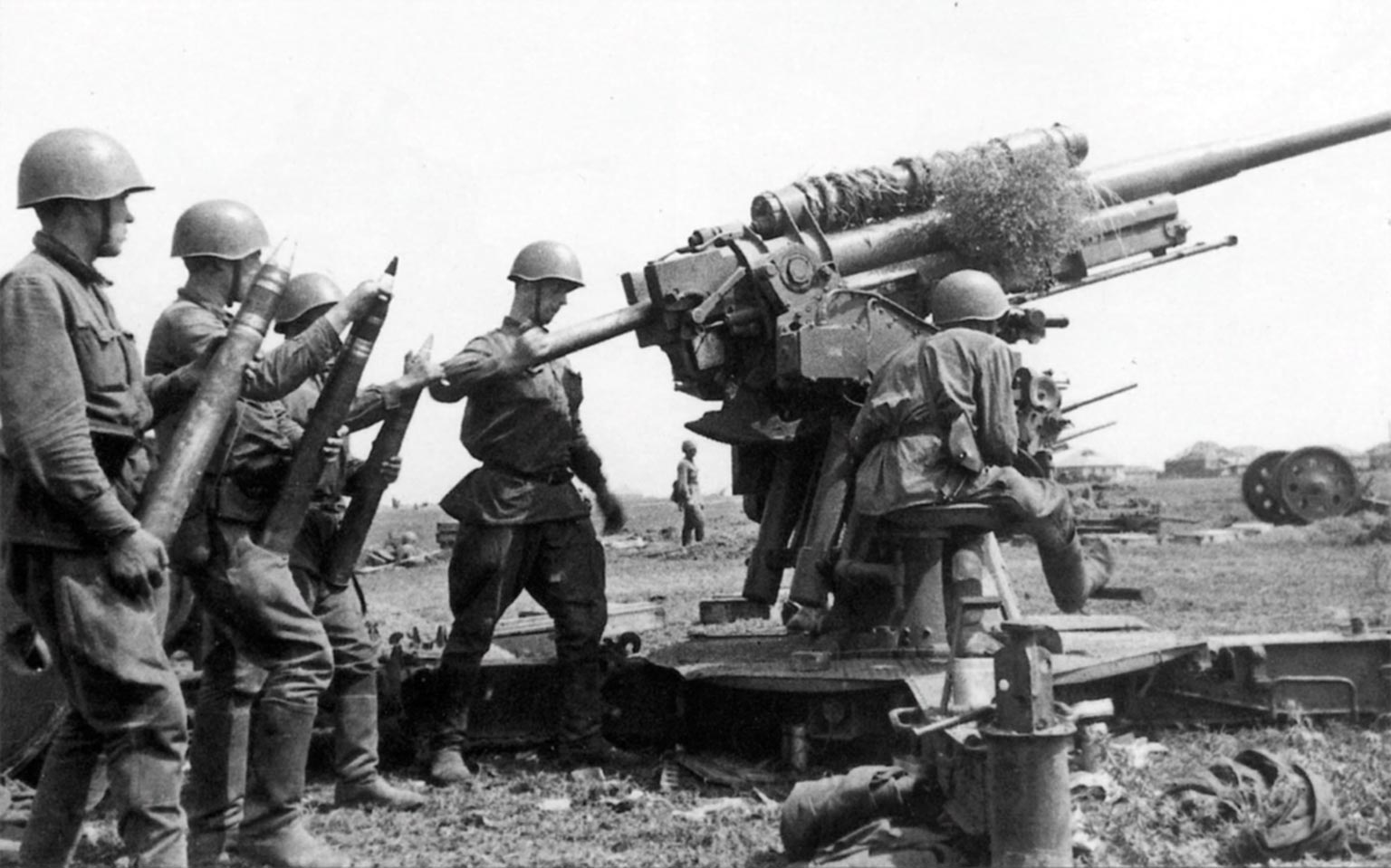
Soviet troops defending Nikolaev, August 1941.

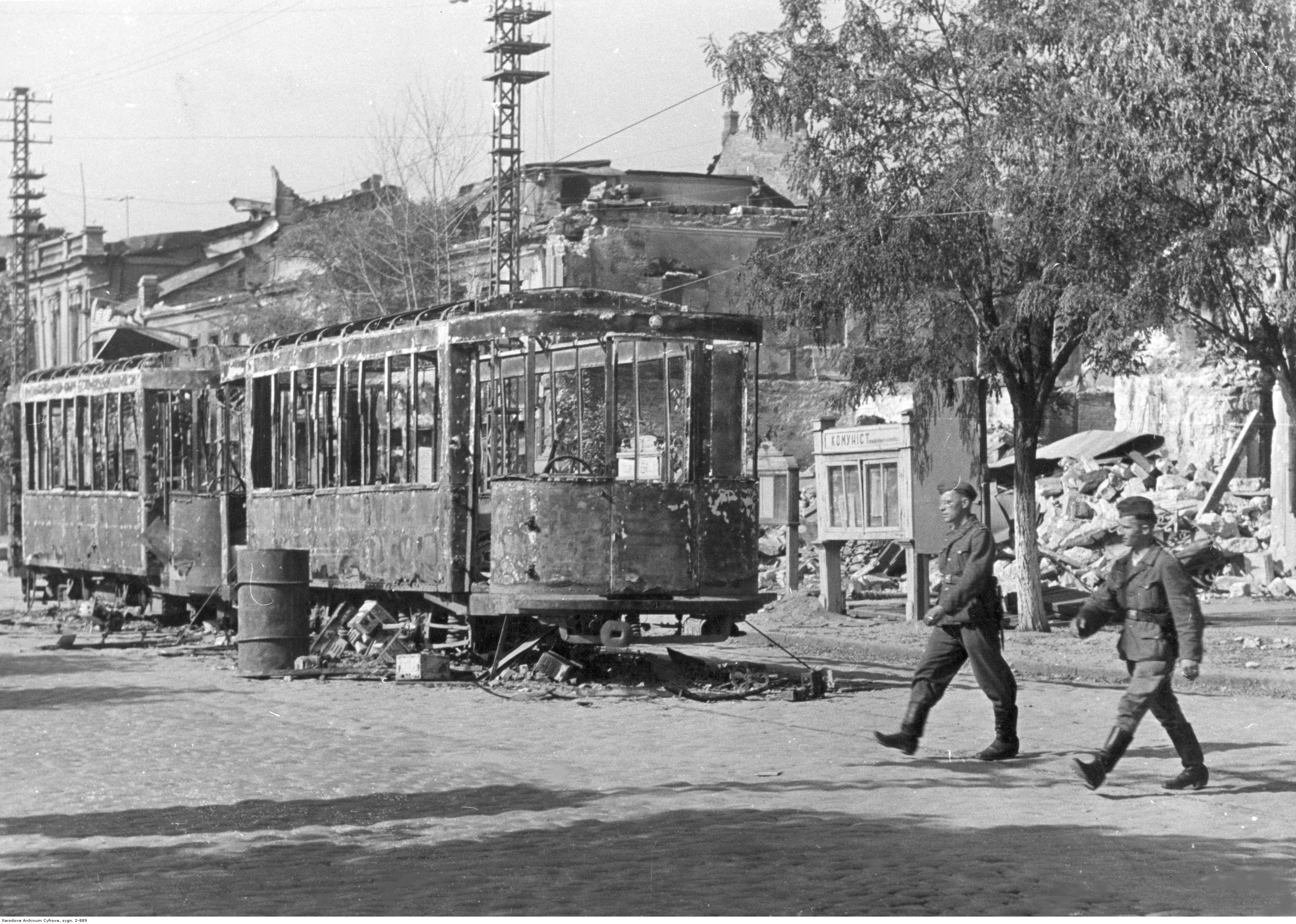
German troops entering Nikolaev after the battle, August 1941.

On the night of 12 August 1941, a tank division of the 11th Army broke through the Soviet defenses near Bashtanka and Lotskyne, setting the stage for a battle in Nikolaev. On the morning of 13 August, the 11th Army reached Nikolaev, entering from both the northeast and eastern sections of the city. At the time, the 18th Army and 9th Army were in charge of the defense of the city. On the day of the 13th, the Commander of the Southern Front, Ivan Tyulenev, ordered that the two armies organise an anti-tank defense along the Inhul and to do whatever was necessary to defend the eastern section of Nikolaev using artillery and tank destroyers. Tulyenev also ordered them to prepare for a night counterattack using reconnaissance to hopefully cut off the approaching German army.

Initially, this worked, with the Soviets repelling the Germans using an anti-aircraft artillery regiment. However, the Soviets were quickly encircled, and on 14 August the decision was made to abandon the city, with the 9th Army being ordered to retreat to the Bug River line and to blow up the not evacuated enterprises in their retreat. On 15 August, the naval base of Nikolaev was evacuated to Sevastopol, and on the following day, 16 August, the Germans took the city by entering on motorcycles through Vodopoy.

==== Occupation ====
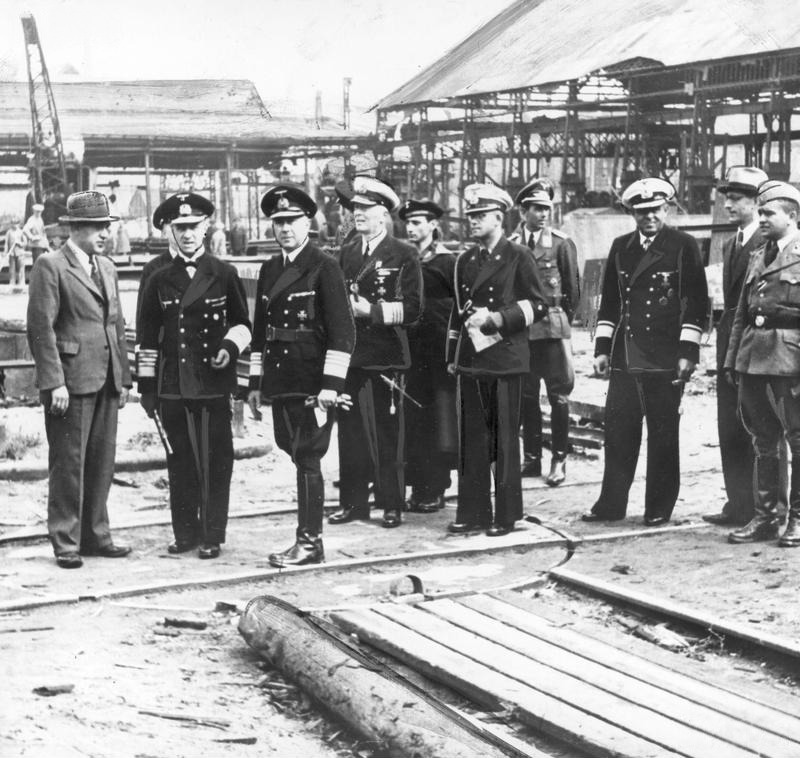
Erich Raeder and other Nazi Germans inspecting Nikolaev, 1942

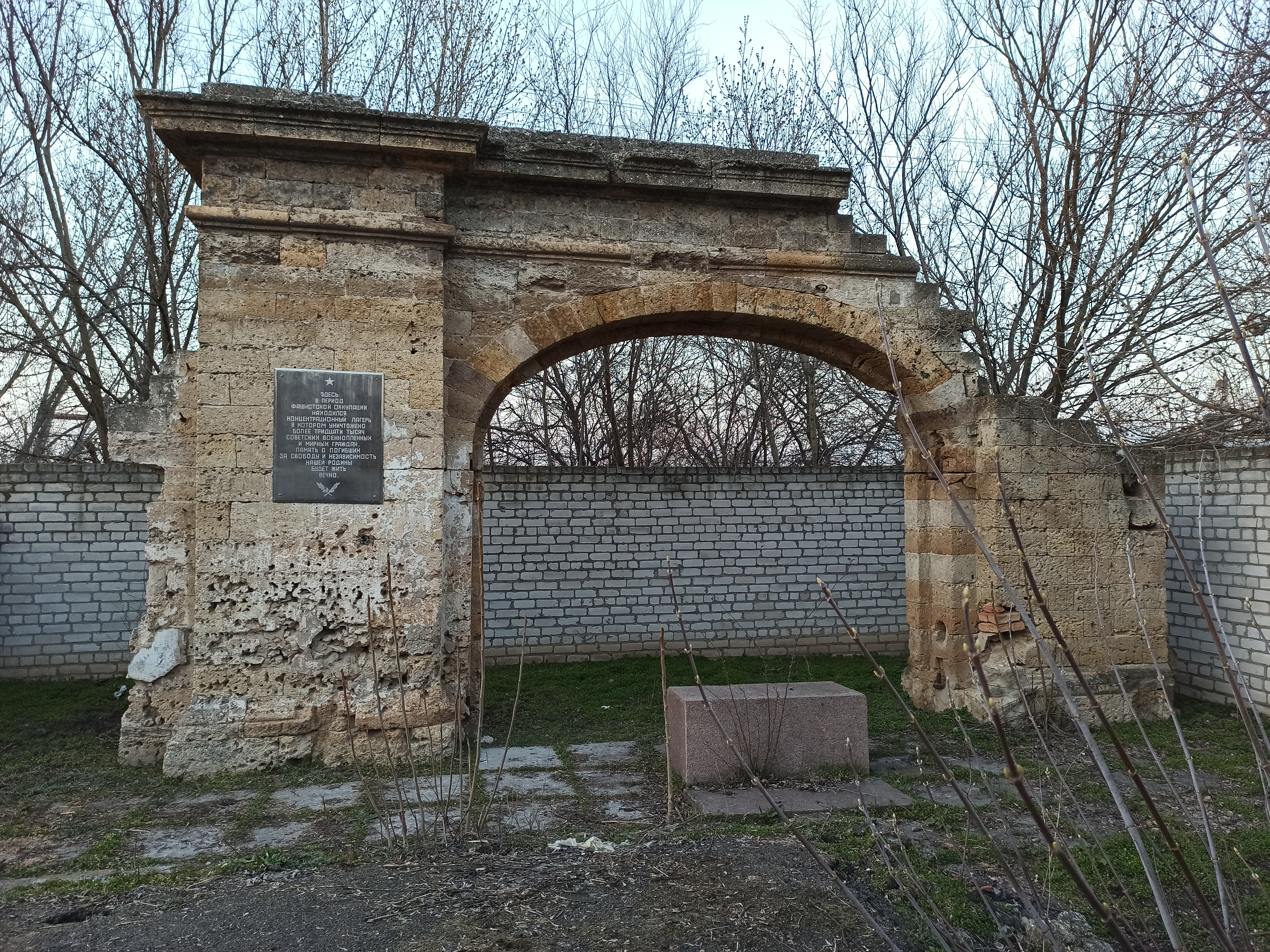
Gate of the Stalag 364 camp

Upon the entry of German troops, Nikolaev became known to the German authorities as Nikolajew, and became the administrative centre of Generalbezirk Nikolajew in Reichskommissariat Ukraine. The appointed head of Generalbezirk Nikolajew was NSFK-Obergruppenführer Ewald Oppermann. Locally, the Bürgermeister (mayor) initially was headed in August 1941 by Orest Masykevych, a member of the Ukrainian nationalist OUN-M, and many of the city's administration was headed by nationalists brought in from Western Ukraine. On 11 December however, Masykevych was dismissed and arrested after being accused of working for underground anti-German organisations. The Nikolaev administration was then purged of most of the Ukrainians, although Mykola Polzunov did become the mayor after great reluctance, while Brigadeführer Tittmann became the police and SS commander, and Major Witzleb took charge of the Schutzpolizei.

Initially, in September, it was recorded that of a population of 170,000 before the war, Nikolaev only had around 85,000 to at most 90,000 people remaining in the city during the occupation. The population of Jews in Nikolaev prior to the war about 25,280 (15% of the city's population), and although some managed to evacuate prior to the occupation, many could not leave in time. Citizens who had evacuated prior to the German capture had their property inventoried and seized, with the better of the property going to German officials, especially after the massacres of Jews, with much Jewish property going to ethnic Germans. The occupation authorities continued to still operate the city, opening up the drama theatre and historical museum with artifacts from Olbia (which were later shipped to Germany) and new taxes starting. Underground local resistance also started in the meantime, which was headed by NKVD officer Viktor Lyagin. Lyagin posed as a German, and was able to gain the trust of the German head of the shipyards in Nikolaev, Admiral von Bodecker. Under Lyagin, the Nikolaev resistance burned a large German warehouse in September, killing over 30 Germans, which was followed up by the destruction of more warehouses and depots. The largest operation done under Lyagin was the destruction of a German military airfield in March 1942 after Lyagin's deputy Aleksandr Sydorchuk entered and exploded the workshops, hangars, 27 planes, and 25 aircraft engines, with the attack costing around 45 million Reichsmarks. All underground cells in Nikolaev were consolidated on 30 September 1942 into the Nikolaev Center (which included Kherson), with the group destroying another airfield, a port crane, and bombing eight German officers by the end of 1942. However, in February 1943, Lyagin was arrested due to an informer and executed, with the Gestapo then destroying the entire underground network over the entire year and killing many of their leaders.

Starting in 1942, the Germans also began the deportation of the youth of Nikolaev for labour in Germany. The Germans threatened execution if they refused, although many self-mutilated to avoid deportation, with propaganda in the German-controlled newspapers promising work, pay, and housing. Deportation was organised at the address bureau of Nikolaev headed by Nikolai Klymov, which compiled lists to select people for deportation. A total of 5,350 people were deported in 1943, with the highest number being deported in September. In April 1942, the Stalag 364 prisoner-of-war camp was also relocated from Rzeszów in German-occupied Poland to Mykolaiv. It was dissolved in December 1943. By later 1943, after the loss of Kiev and the start of the Dnieper–Carpathian offensive, the Germans began preparing to evacuate firms and Volksdeutsche citizens. In February, Polzunov supplied his final list of residents for deportation, and in March the city began giving exit passes while the German city administration was shut down. During this, Polzunov also ordered the destruction of all administrative records kept by the Germans.

===== Holocaust =====
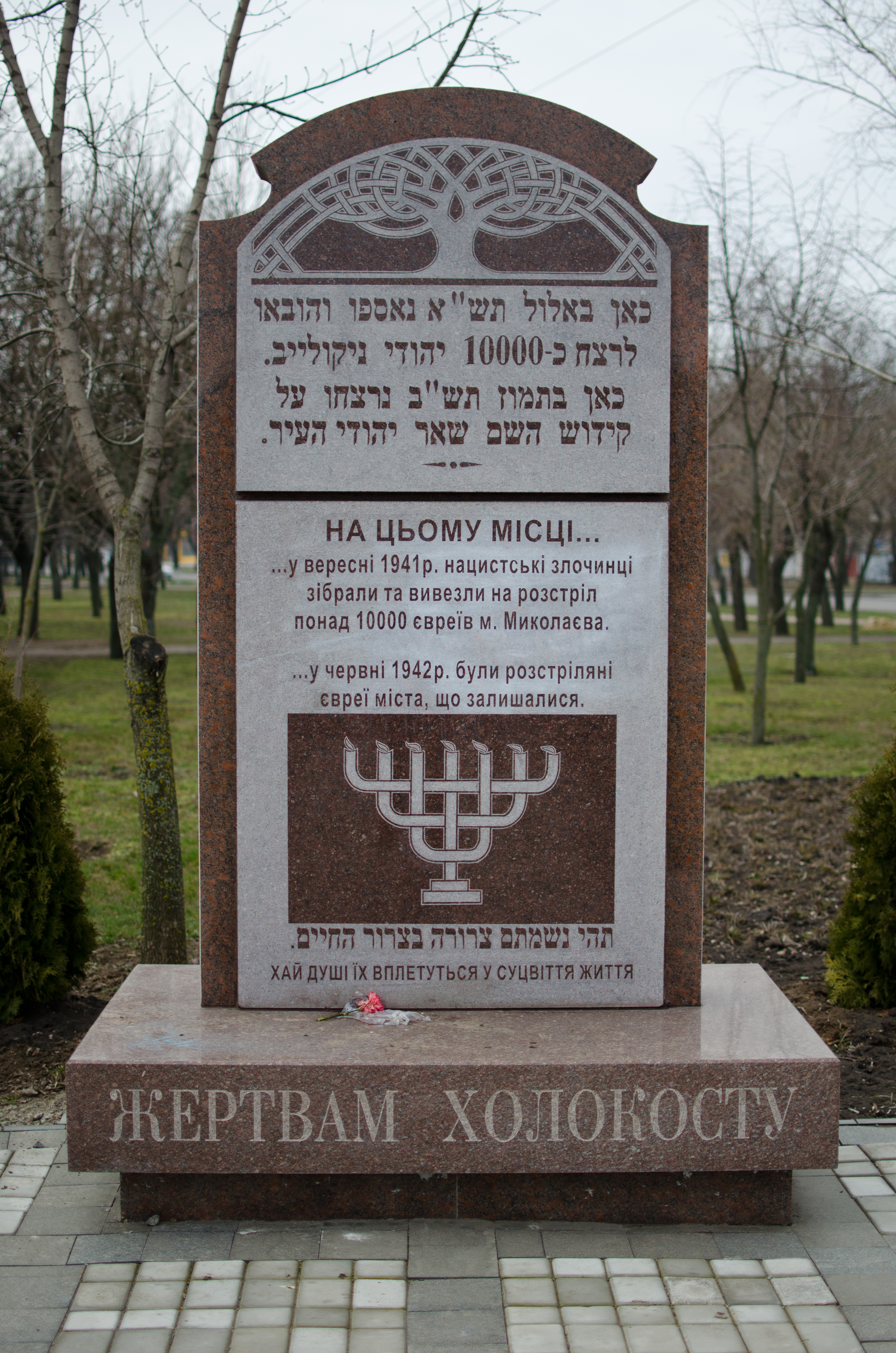
Holocaust memorial in Nikolaev

On 14 September 1941, the Germans ordered all Jews in Nikolaev to appear for registration at what was once the Jewish cemetery, but is now the Mykolaiv Zoo. They were ordered to bring all their valuables and documents. Instead, under the orders of Einsatzgruppe D led by Otto Ohlendorf, massacred the Jews in the Nikolaev massacre from 16–30 September 1941. Members of Einsatzgruppe D and the 9th Police Battalion first shot Jews near the cemetery on Kherson highway, before killing the rest in three ravines near Voskresenske, Kalynivka, and Horokhivka. Before the massacres, Jewish people were required to undress at the ravine, and then the men were shot first followed by women and children in groups of ten. This was later confirmed by the former commander of Sonderkommando 11a, Paul Z., who said they shot around 3,500 to 4,000 Jews during this time, although this is likely an underestimate, as various figures range from 4,000 at the least to 5,000 at the most just for Jews from the city of Nikolaev. In a report after the massacre, Einsatzgruppe D confirmed that Nikolaev and Kherson had been "freed" of Jews..

For the remaining Jews who were not shot, they were required to wear a Yellow badge with the Star of David. Throughout 1941, the German authorities began to hunt down the remaining Jews, shooting them in pits near the Inhul, while some were sent to a labour camp in 1942 before also being killed. As part of Aktion 1005, in order for the Germans to conceal the genocide, they ordered 150 Soviet prisoners to exhume and burn the remains of the Jewish victims before they themselves were also burned alive so as to not leave witnesses.

==== Ol′shanskiy Landing and Liberation of Nikolaev ====
Ol′shanskiy landing map

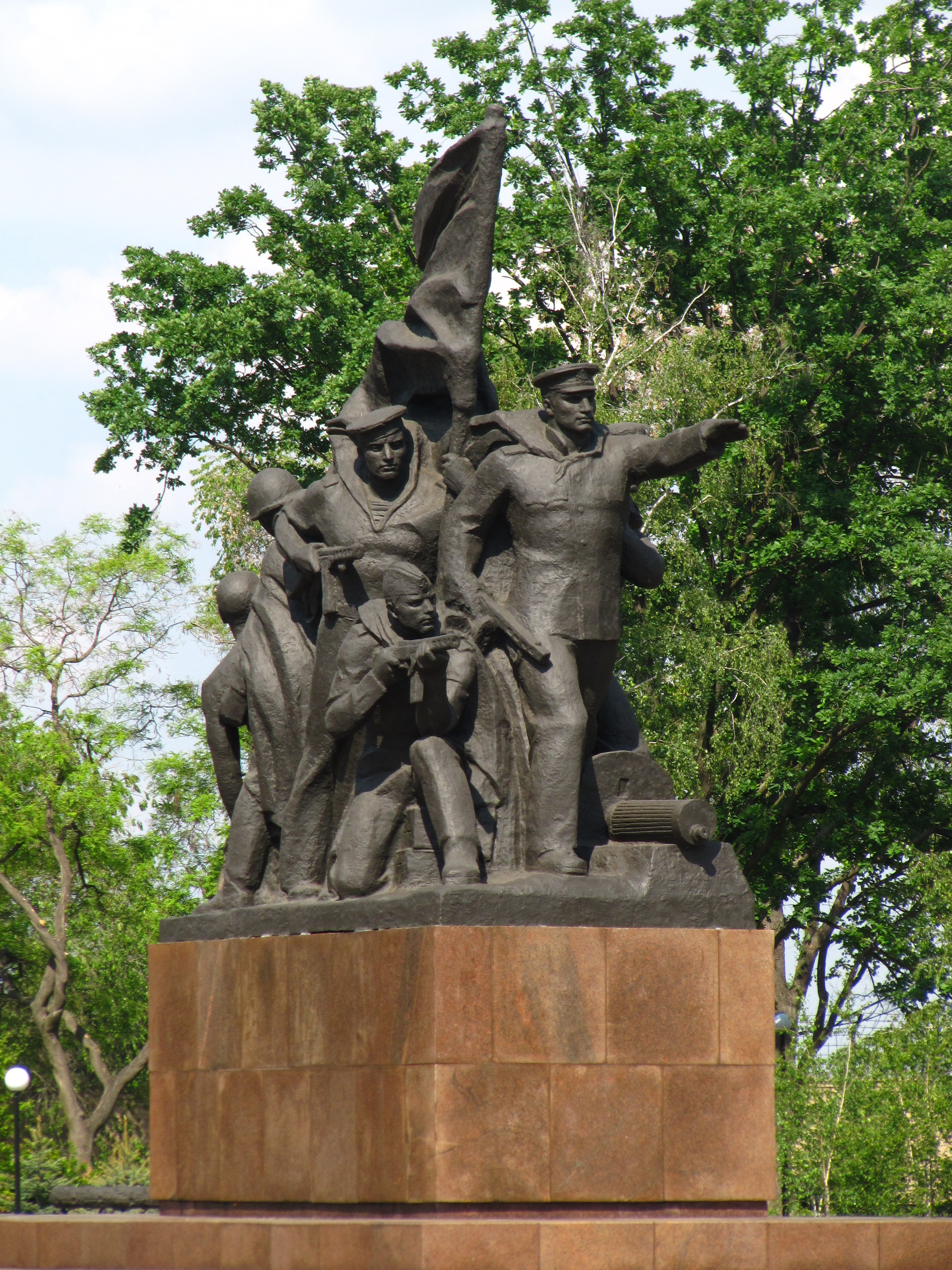
Monument to paratroopers of Ol′shanskiy

In mid-March, the Soviets successfully completed the Bereznegovatoye–Snigirevka offensive, and so the 3rd Ukrainian Front edged near Nikolaev in the east. On 12 March 1944, Joseph Stalin ordered Rodion Malinovsky to liberate Nikolaev and Kherson. Meanwhile, the Germans held a defensive belt in the east of Nikolaev, which was held by many troops. This included the 370th Infantry Division, 79th Infantry Division, 304th Infantry Division, the Romanian 24th Infantry Division, battalions of the 999th Fortress Regiment, SS garrisons, and both rifle and security battalions. On 24 March 1944, Konstantin Olshansky led 100 Soviet naval personnel into Nikolaev, however, this initial attempt failed after the pontoons could not be used due to a heavy current.

On 25 March 1944, Major Fyodor Kotanov ordered Olshansky's detachment to try and land again in Nikolaev on the morning of 26 March. The intended attack was meant to disrupt the Germans by attacking them at their rear so the Red Army could move in and liberate Nikolaev more easily. In this attempt, there were a total of 55 sailors with Olshansky, with twelve army personnel who were sappers and signalmen attached because it was reported that the area was mined, bringing the total with the river pilot to 68 men. The detachment departed on fishing boats from Bohoiavlensk and quickly encountered significant difficulties due to boats sinking constantly, and so they initially turned back and removed the twelve attached personnel before going back to Nikolaev. Early in the morning, they landed at the port elevator and cleared the mines and sentries, holding their defense at the "Zagotzerno" grain-office building. They were quickly discovered by the Germans, although the Soviets managed to repel most of the attacks, dealing heavy losses to a German battalion. After the Germans brought in four field guns and rocket mortars, and with most of the men being mortally wounded, Olshansky requested to his command to call down artillery fire on his position. A Soviet battalion attempted to send in 100 reinforcements the following day to aid the men who were still alive, but failed, and by 28 March only 12 of the people who landed remained alive. That day, the Soviets crossed in and encircled the Germans at Varvarivka bridge, and so the Germans chose to withdraw. After finding the Zagotzerno building, it was reported by Soviet troops that there were hundreds of Germans dead in the vicinity due to Olshansky's troops. The event would become known as Ol′shanskiy Landing.

In the aftermath, it was reported that the 55 troops killed around 700 officers, heavily helping the fast liberation of Nikolaev on 28 March 1944. The Soviet troops that helped with the liberation were listed as either members of the Third Ukrainian Front or members of the Black Sea Fleet, alongside the underground group "Patriot of the Motherland". The following troops were honoured with the honorary title of Nikolaev for their participation: 2nd Guards Mechanized Corps, 86th Guards Rifle Division, 108th Guards Rifle Division, 1st Guards Fortified Region, 92nd Guards Corps Artillery Regiment, 282nd Separate Aviation Signal Regiment, 384th Separate Marine Battalion, 99th Separate Guards Motorcycle Battalion, 38th Separate Line Communications Battalion, 23rd Assault Aviation Regiment of the Navy, and the 11th Guards Fighter Aviation Regiment of the Navy. In 1945, the Presidium of the Supreme Soviet awarded the Hero of the Soviet Union status to 67 individuals in association with Ol′shanskiy Landing, although this number is known to be incorrect because eleven people named were not part of the 67 men listed as belonging to the landing. The few veterans that survived the landing, of which there were six, accused the battalion commander of Kotanov of falsifying the award to the others, while members who did participate, such as A.I. Andreev, took until 1965 to get their award after petitions. The twelve attached personnel who were dropped off did not receive the title, and only four were ever identified.

==== Nikolaev Trials ====
Indictment of Nikolaev Trials, 1946

In November 1944, an act by the Nikolaev regional commission found that mass arrests began in October 1941, with massacres beginning by victims being sent in covered trucks to Temvod and shot in pits in batches. Some people who were only wounded were said to be buried alive. It was further reported by this commission that the Germans in June 1942 had rounded up the remaining Jews and burned them alive on pyres, cordoning off the cemetery so the population could not see. In total, the commission found that 80,000 people were killed in the city during the occupation, with many bodies being burned to hide the evidence. This early report also found that the Germans engaged in torture in many cases, burning victims, driving needles through them, mutilating them, and gouging eyes out.

In January 1946, nine Germans were accused of war crimes in Nikolaev, and were sent to an open military tribunal at the Chkalov Regional Theater. The trial was covered daily from 10–17 January, with over 600 spectators attending. The first defendant accused was Lieutenant General Gerhard Winkler, who was the military commander of Nikolaev and said to have ordered the deportation of civilians, the shooting of those who did not cooperate, the burning down of buildings, and in March 1944 was the one who decreed that anyone who resisted deportation in Nikolaev would be shot. The second SS-Obersturmführer Hermann Sandner, who was head of the police and SD in Nikolaev, and who was implicated in the killing of civilians, Jews, Romas, and those who were deemed "mentally ill". There was also Major Max Bütner, head of the gendarmerie of Nikolaev, who was accused of arresting over 1,500 people and deporting others, Captain Franz Kandler, the gendarmerie chief of Kherson, and Major Robert Michel, gendarmerie chief of Bereznehuvate Raion. The last defendants were Major Ferdinand Witzleb, head of Nikolaev's Schutzpolizei, who hanged citizens and deported others, Captain Gerhard Schmale, the deputy to Witzleb, Rudolf Berg, a gendarmerie sergeant who shot and hanged many people, and finally Corporal Josef Happ of the 783rd Security Battalion who personally shot many people.

On 17 January 1946, the tribunal under A.S. Zonov sentenced seven of the nine to death by hanging, while Kandler and Happ got 20 years of hard labour. The ones sentenced to hanging were killed that same day in public - around 65 to 70,000 people showed up - at Bazaar Square, where their bodies were left for a few days.

=== Post-war ===
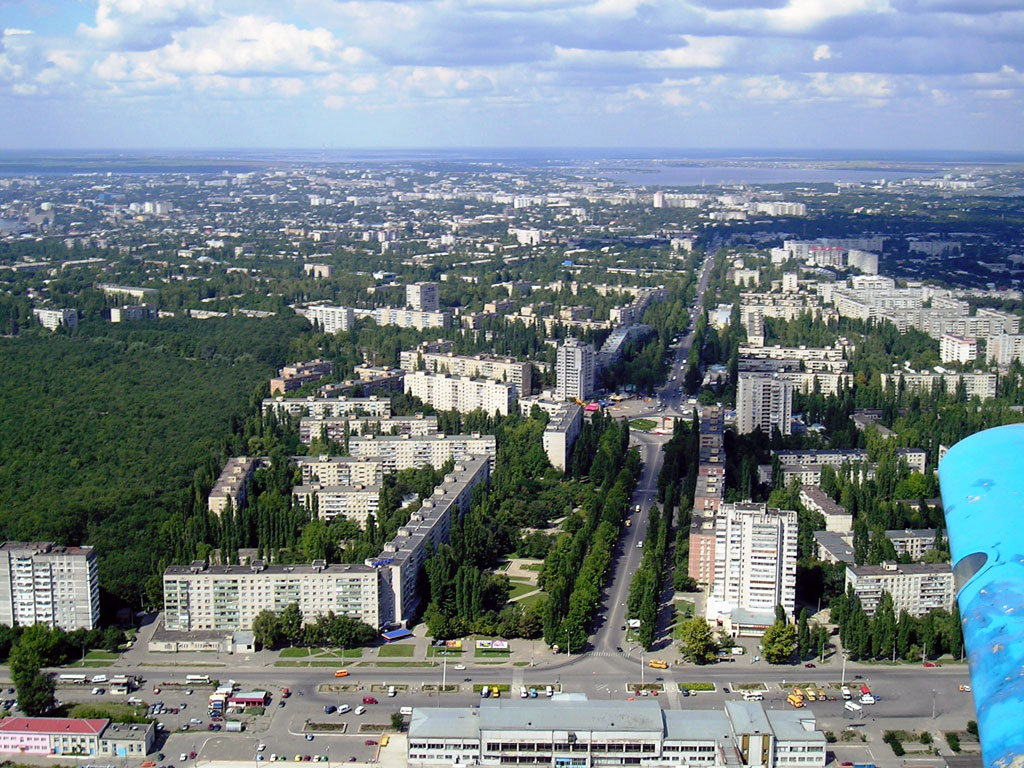
Soviet-era apartment blocks in Nikolaev.

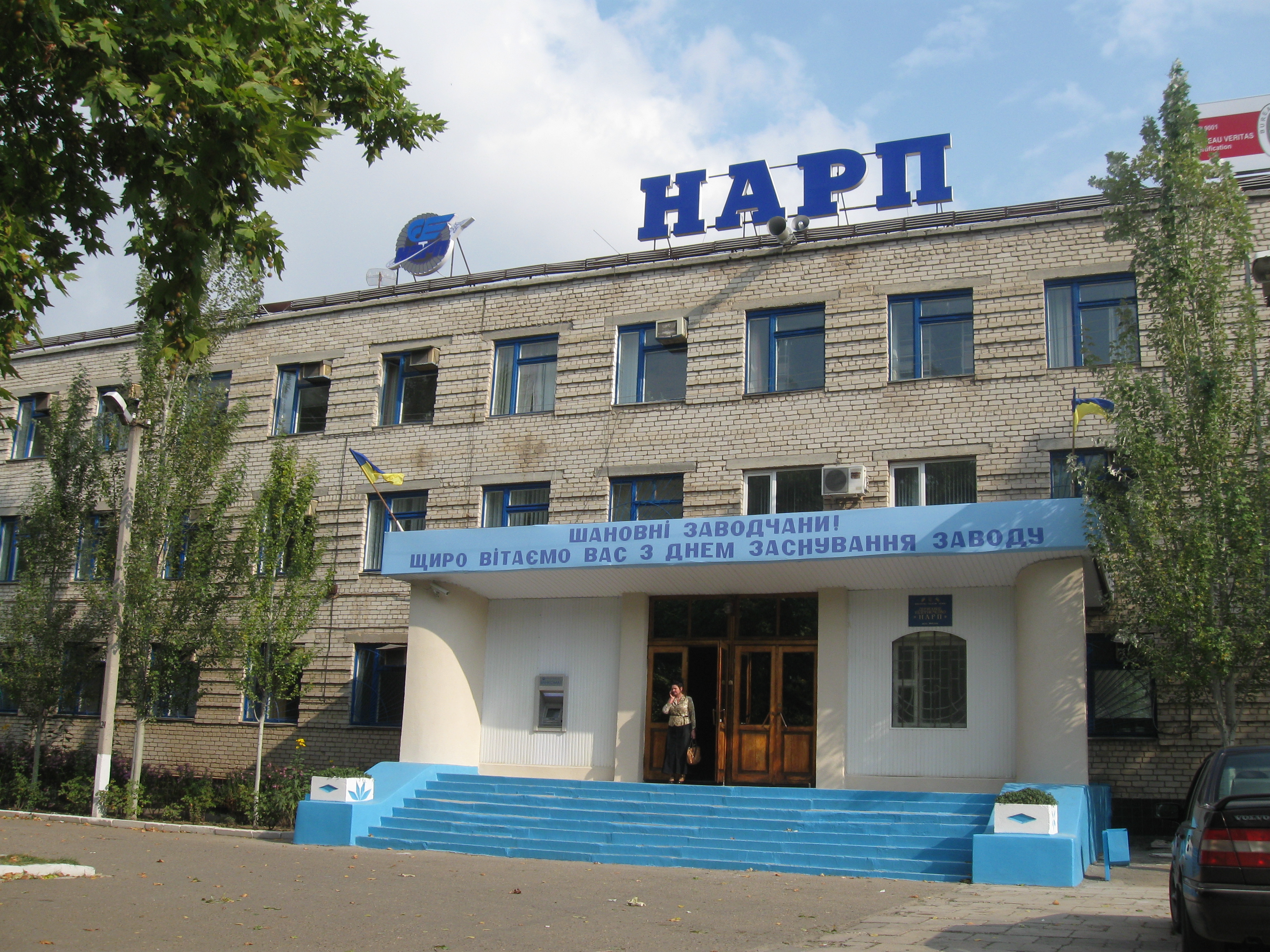
Nikolaev Alumina Refinery Project. It was built in 1977.

After the war, which devastated the city, work began almost immediately on reconstructing the enterprises in the city. First to be reconstructed was the Black Sea Shipyard, and within six months after liberation, 216 enterprises had been reconstructed in Nikolaev. In honour of the war, it was proposed to lay out a new Victory Park at the Inhul, and in 1946 a memorial to the paratroops who landed in Nikolaev was unveiled at what was then Lenin Square. The restoration of travel in terms of tram lines was completed a few years later in 1949. During this time, Nikolaev still had a fairly active OUN underground, namely under Vasyl Poglod, who was eventually uncovered in 1951. However, many of the members of the OUN network in Nikolaev were killed in reprisals by the Soviets after the war, with SMERSH shooting seven in March 1944. The last known senior member in Nikolaev was arrested in May 1950 near Prymorsk on the way to establish an underground cell there, who was only ever identified as "Bom".

In the 1950s, the city's economy continued to grow with the opening of the city's third shipyard after both Black Sea and Mykolayiv, which was known as Okean Shipyard. A new railway station designed by Kiev-based Transportproekt was opened in Nikolaev in 1954 alongside the gas turbine complex Zorya-Mashproekt. The period of the Khrushchev thaw in the mid-1950s only effected Nikolaev very faintly since it remained a closed city, although the city did begin absorbing its surrounding villages during this time, such as Vodopoy, Solyani, and Kulbakino. The largest absorption was of Oktyabrskoye or Bohoyavlensk, which was specifically absorbed to hopefully reach a population of 500,000, however, this never occurred. Into the 1960s, Nikolaev began opening up more cultural venues, such as the regional oblast library and the "Rodina" cinema. 1964 marked the city's 175th anniversary, with the jubilee ship "Nikolaev", which was also the thousandth vessel built in Nikolaev, being sent out with a message from Yuri Gagarin. That same year, the new Varvarivskyi Bridge over the Southern Bug was opened up, which was given a Lenin Prize. Throughout the late 1960s, the gross output of the shipyards drastically increased, with major reconstruction programs beginning in Okean specifically.

On 31 December 1970, the city was awarded the Order of the Red Banner of Labour for its work in the five-year plans, with the Black Sea shipyard also being awarded the Order of the October Revolution at the same time. The Dormashina plant building also became more important during this time due to being the USSR's sole supplier of machinery for asphalt and cement road surfaces. In 1977, construction also began on the Nikolaev Alumina Plant, which processed bauxite, with the plant's first production stage being completed by July 1980. However, there was also a wave of unrest during this period in Nikolaev over late wage payments and quotas, especially after some workers refused to ship grain to Cuba, which was discussed by Petro Shelest. In 1981, reconstruction of the old Inhul Bridge was completed with it being commissioned in 1982. By the late 1980s, both economic and environmental troubles from the city's rapid development began to show. Nikolaev's economy was mostly tied to its shipyards, and was not diverse at all, while the Bug estuary by this point had become heavily polluted due to constant industrial discharge. During the era of Perestroika, initially the city's branch of the People's Movement of Ukraine was outright banned, with the oblast party committee issuing plans to attempt to counter the "opposition" via monitoring. Nevertheless, the NRU still had an active presence in the city, protesting the renaming of a street to Potemkinska in October 1989, and they participated in the "Chain of Unity" campaign in western Ukraine. By early 1990, the independence movement in Nikolaev had reached a high point with Ukrainian flags being displayed in the city. In the summer of 1991, Rukh activists in the city also led the "Buh-Cossack River" march.

== Independent Ukraine ==
=== 1990s to early 2010s ===
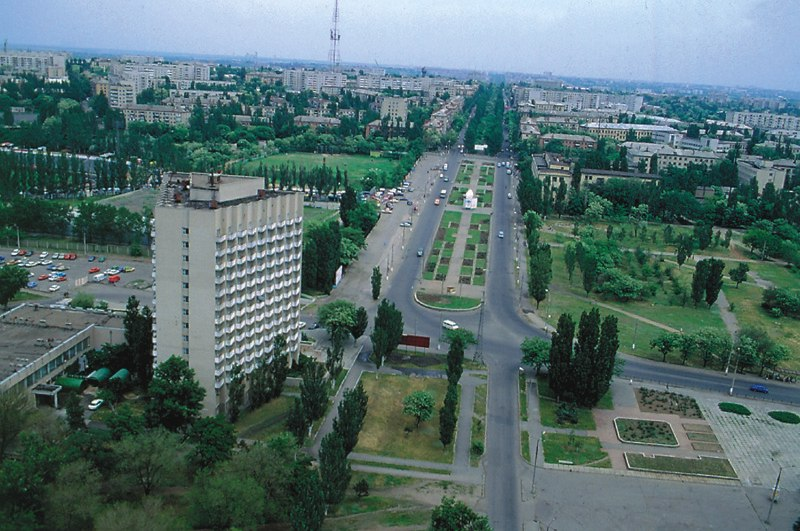
Prospekt Lenina in Mykolaiv, 1998.

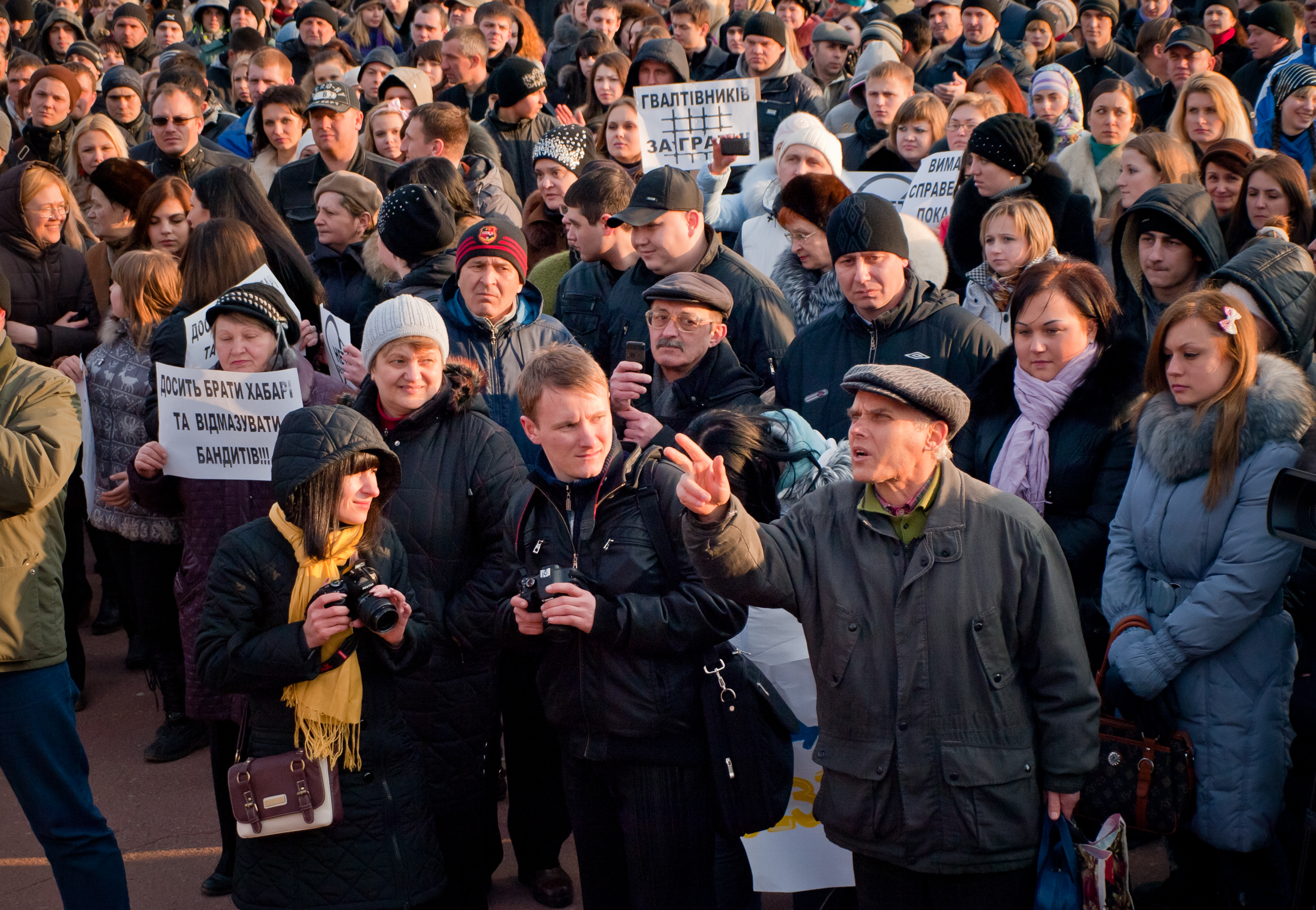
Protests in support of Oksana Makar, 2012.

In August 1991, the city became part of a newly independent Ukraine after the collapse of the Soviet Union, which was confirmed by the December independence referendum. In the referendum, 89.45% of citizens of Mykolaiv Oblast voted for independence (the declaration did not separate for cities, except for the special municipalities of Kyiv and Sevastopol). Shortly after independence, in 1992, the city's airport started servicing international flights after having only ever previously done domestic flights in the USSR. Four years later, on 15 November 1996, the Verkhovna Rada incorporated the urban-type settlements of Velyka Korenykha, Matviivka, Ternivka and the village of Mala Korenykha into Mykolaiv to bring the area of Mykolaiv up to 25,282.6 hectares. During the 2000s, many of the city's enterprirses were privatised or restructured, with the "Zorya" and "Mashproekt" plants being merged to make Zorya-Mashproekt and the Black Sea Shipyard being privatised and sold to Russians. During this time, many cultural objects were also opened, such as a monument to St. Nicholas, the international theatre festival "The Playing Man", a memorial to Chernobyl, and a bust of Vyacheslav Chornovil. In the late 2000s, investments for the Okean shipyard began after being privatised by the Norwegian company Aker and then purchased by the Russian company FLC, with the shipyard signing an agreement with Nibulon for barges. The 2008 financial crisis did hit Mykolaiv, causing many projects to be temporarily stopped, with construction of the "Leski-2" microdistrict near Namyv only resuming in April 2010.

Mykolaiv garnered significant international attention in 2012 due to the murder of Oksana Makar. On the night of 8–9 March 2012, Makar was lured into an apartment by Artem Pohosian, Maksym Prysiazhniuk, and Yevhen Krasnoshchok, who raped her, then moved her to a construction site and attempted to burn her alive by setting the site on fire. The case attracted significant backlash due to two of the suspects being released early, in part due to being from politically connected families, which led to protests drawing in from 2,000 to 10,000 people in Mykolaiv. The protests also spread nationwide to Kyiv, Odesa, Lviv, Kharkiv, and Sumy, over the perceived corruption of the Ukrainian justice system. On 27 November 2012, after the three were arrested following the backlash, Krasnoshchok was sentenced to life imprisonment while Prysiazhniuk got 15 years and Pohosian 14 years. That same year, the Mykolaiv City Council granted the Russian language regional status in the city, which was backed by the Party of Regions and Communist Party of Ukraine, which led to numerous protests outside the city council building. The following year, reconstruction began on the old centre of Mykolaiv, with numerous apartment buildings being reconstructed, such as those near Moskovska street, Potemkinska street, and Karl Liebknecht street. A student sports complex was also opened with a stadium that year alongside reconstruction continuing on the main stadium in the city.

=== Euromaidan ===
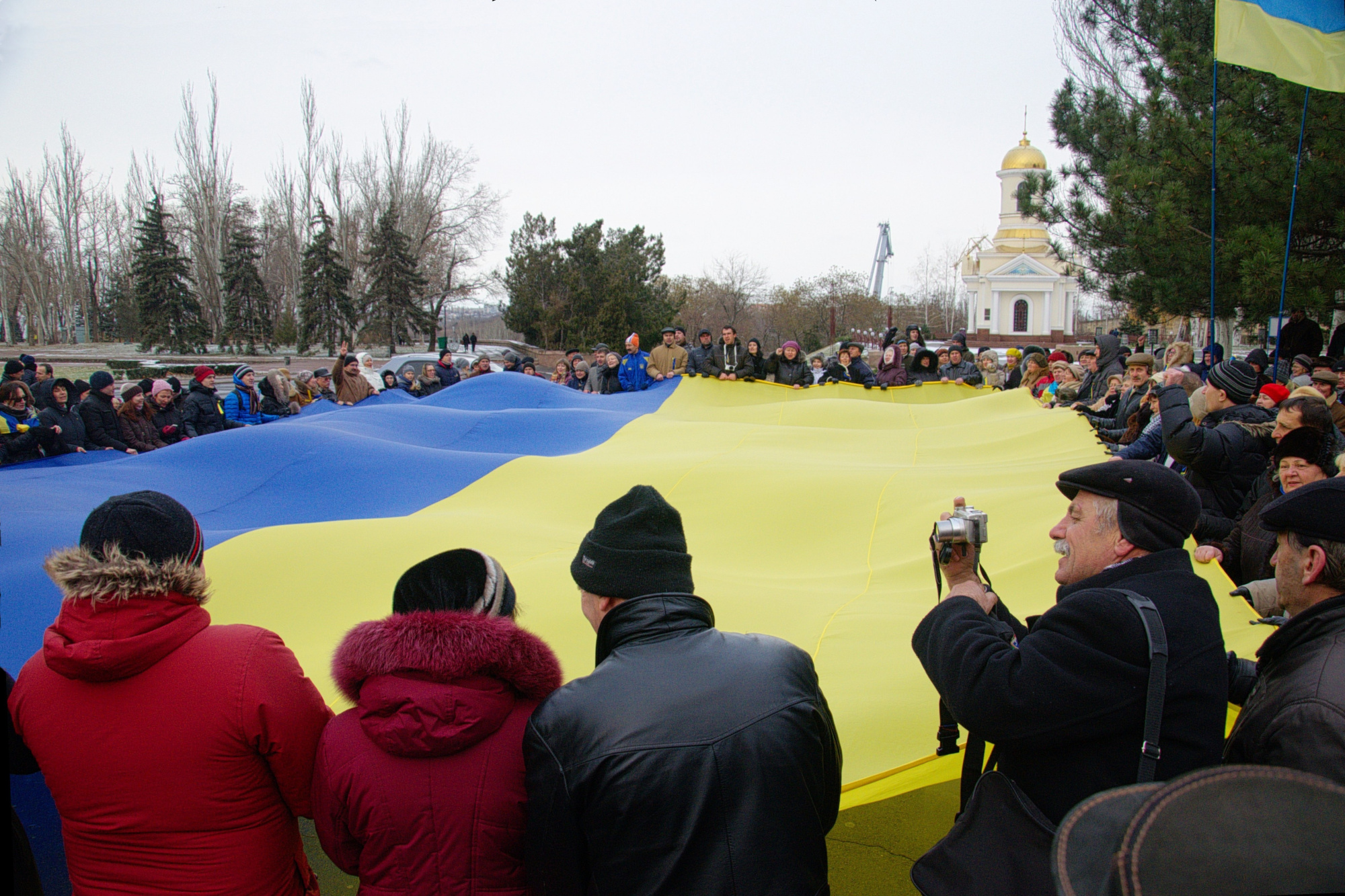
Initial Euromaidan protestors in Mykolaiv, December 2013.

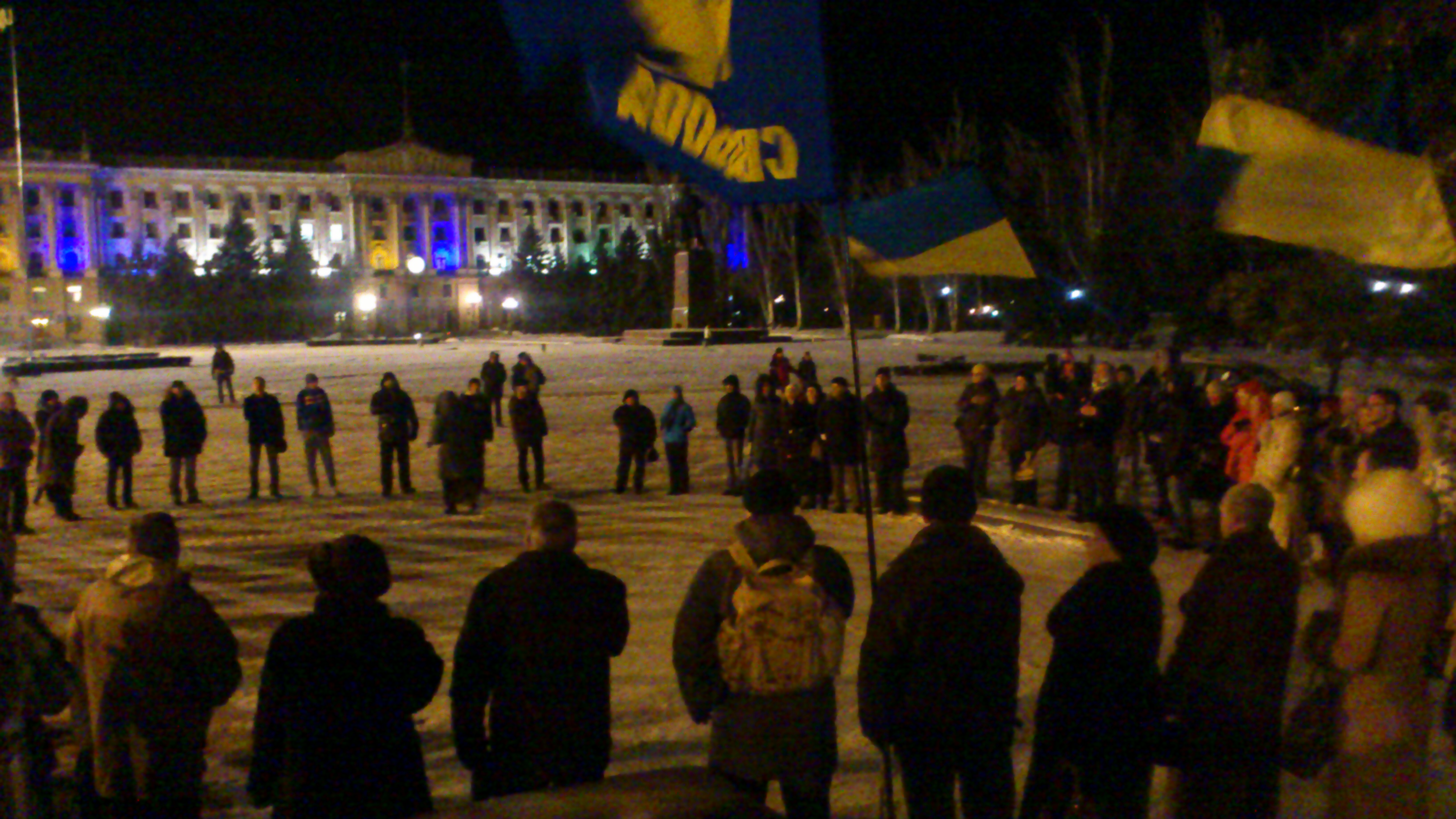
Euromaidan protestors in Mykolaiv, January 2014.

Euromaidan protests first began on 21–22 November 2013 after there were calls to support Kyiv by gathering at Lenin Square with the banner of "Mykolaiv supports the EU". On that night, clashes broke out between the police and the protestors after the police attempted to tear down the makeshift tents, leading to the police dispersing the rally. This was later denied by the city police chief, Yurii Siednev, who said that the dispersal had not happened and that people "were not touched", calling it a "provocation", although he defended the removal of tents. As a result, all rallies in Mykolaiv were banned by the city court due to a "potential threat". Despite this, some 30 people still returned to Mykolaiv, protesting against the ban. Further protests continued in December 2013, when rallies were held as part of the "Marrch of Millions". Anti-Maidan counterprotests started in February 2014, with the pro-Russian group called the "South-Eastern Front of Ukraine" being formed to meet at the landing monument. On the day of the start of the Russian occupation of Crimea, the pro-Russian protestors took over Lenin Square, throwing stones at pro-Euromaidan protestors and calling themselves "defenders of Lenin". The police, at the time, said they would not intervene.

Starting in March, pro-Russian supporters also began a blockade, especially on the highways after they claimed Ukrainian weapons were being brought in. Some protestors were alleged to be a part of an organisation under Viktor Medvedchuk. Despite this, on 2 March 2014 a large pro-Ukrainian rally was held consisting of 5,000 to 10,000 people on Sadova Street. The rally was led by Taras Kremin, who called for a minute of silence over the killing of protestors in Kyiv, which was followed by numerous other people from the city. It was reported in early March that the pro-Russian separatists had proposed to the acting mayor, Yurii Hranaturov, that they be added to the city's executive committee while they also asked for a referendum on an autonomous oblast of Mykolaiv. The pro-Russians also held a rally in Mykolaiv of about 1,000 people at the same time in early March near the landing monument, in which they called for Mykolaiv to join Russia and non-recognition of the government. On 16 March, pro-Russian actions were banned, although this did not affect anything, and protestors continued calling for a "Novorossiya" and attacking pro-European activists while separatist leaflets were distributed throughout the city. Tension built at the end of the month when pro-Russian activists were also brought in from Odesa to begin a large rally.

The culmination of the events happened on 6–7 April, when the pro-Russian separatists set the anti-separatist headquarters on fire, leading to members of the Right Sector calling for the countering of separatists while the pro-Russian separatists attempted to seize the city oblast administration, shouting "Putin, take us". Clashes between the two sides continued throughout the day, with pro-European protestors managing to tear down the pro-Russian camp near the landing monument while the police started using force against both sides. This effectively ended the attempts at separation in Mykolaiv, as the SBU also began working to capture the pro-separatist movement. A later retrospective said the defeat of separatism in Mykolaiv came as a surprise, as most only spoke Russian and Mykolaiv was referred to as a "Russian city of shipbuilders", although this ignored the wider amount of Ukrainian-speaking areas in Mykolaiv Oblast.

=== Recovery ===
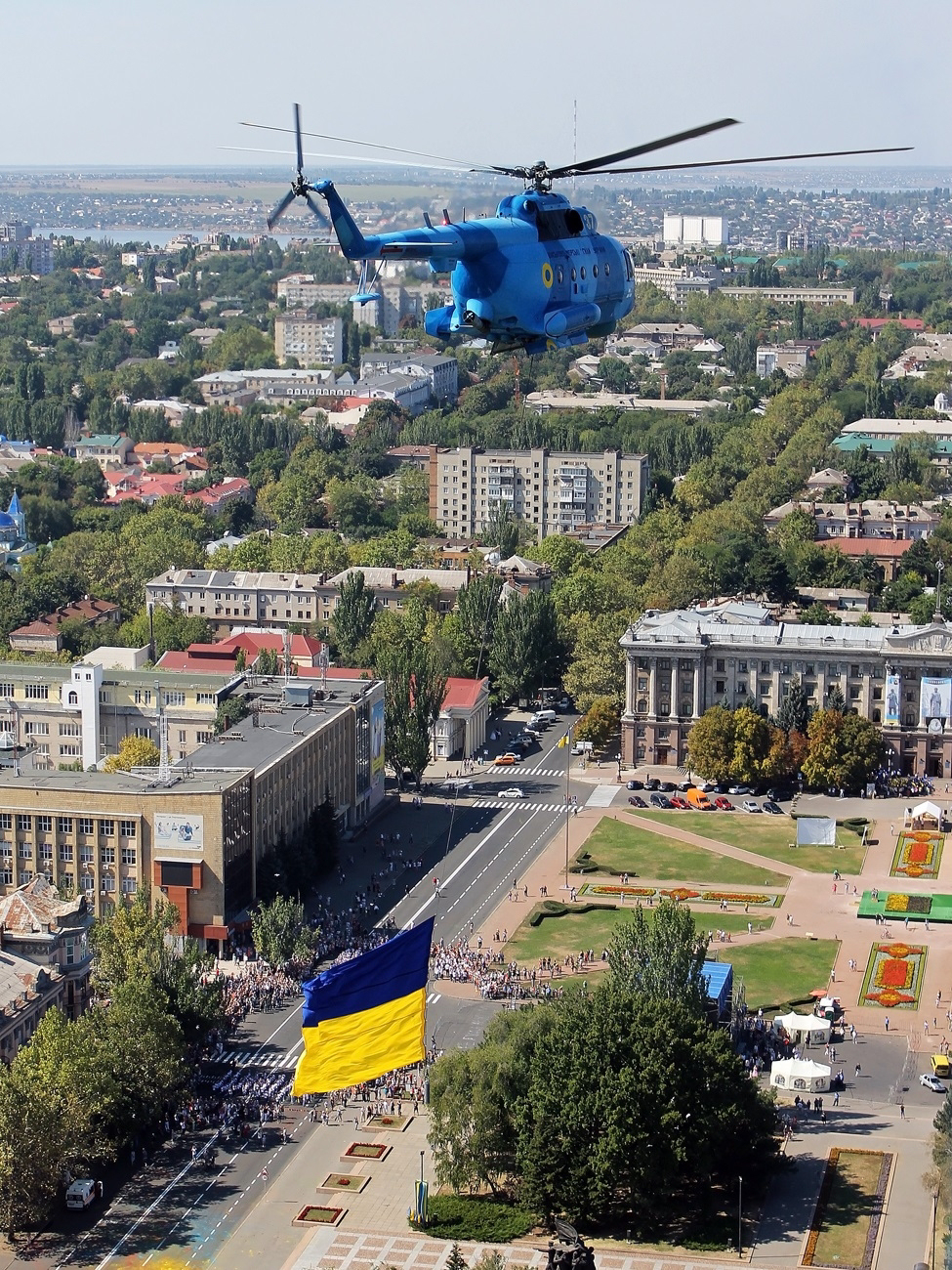
A helicopter over Mykolaiv, 2016.

In the aftermath of the revolution, there were still two separate incidents of people trying to enter the city with weapons or bombs, but were stopped. During the War in the Donbas, Mykolaiv also took in some internally displaced persons from the ATO zone. In February 2015, in honour of the Heavenly Hundred, a 4-metre-tall monument titled "Heroes of the Heavenly Hundred" was unveiled at Europe Square. The following year, in January, a new government structure called the "Mykolaiv Development Agency" was opened with a grant from Canada to help with infrastructure and social projects, among other things. Upon opening, its head said plans for the year included reconstructing Soborna Street, creating a presentation and study in order to market Mykolaiv to audiences, and a resource center. To comply with decommunisation laws that same year, lots of areas in Mykolaiv were renamed such as the administrative district of "Leninskyi" to "Inhulskyi" or "Lenin Avenue" to "Tsentralnyi Avenue". The most prominent renaming was of the main street, Soviet Street, to Soborna Street. In total, 129 things were named due to decommunisation during that year. Later that year, also as part of decommunisation, the full dismantling of the former statue of Lenin was also started. The city's largest retail complex was opened in 2016 for the 25th year of independence, called "Siti-tsentr" at the intersection of Tsentralnyi and Sadova streets, which had dozens of shops.

Starting in November 2017, the Mykolaiv Airport, which had been closed since the spring of 2013, announced it had received permission to do flights, which was confirmed by August 2017. Flights first resumed from the airport in November 2018, and international flights to Sharm el-Sheikh in December 2018. That same year, the Okean shipyard was sold off from Russian ownership, with investment being done by Eurobulk. However, in January 2020, a seizure order was placed on Okean, while the Mykolaiv shipyard still continued to work. Until 18 July 2020, Mykolaiv was incorporated as a city of oblast significance. It also served as the administrative center of Mykolaiv and Vitovka Raions even though it did not belong to any of these raions. In July 2020, as part of the administrative reform of Ukraine, which reduced the number of raions of Mykolaiv Oblast to four, the city of Mykolaiv was merged into Mykolaiv Raion. The COVID-19 pandemic first heavily hit the city in March 2021, when stricter quarantine measures were announced, including the closure of institutions, centres, stores, and a ban on mass events. The measures led to protests against the lockdown in April by business owners. Later that year, in June 2021, the Black Sea Shipyard was declared bankrupt, and all employees were dismissed from the shipyard. The COVID situation was escalated in October 2021 when the Commission on Environmental Safety put Mykolaiv Oblast in a red-danger zone.

=== Russian invasion of Ukraine ===
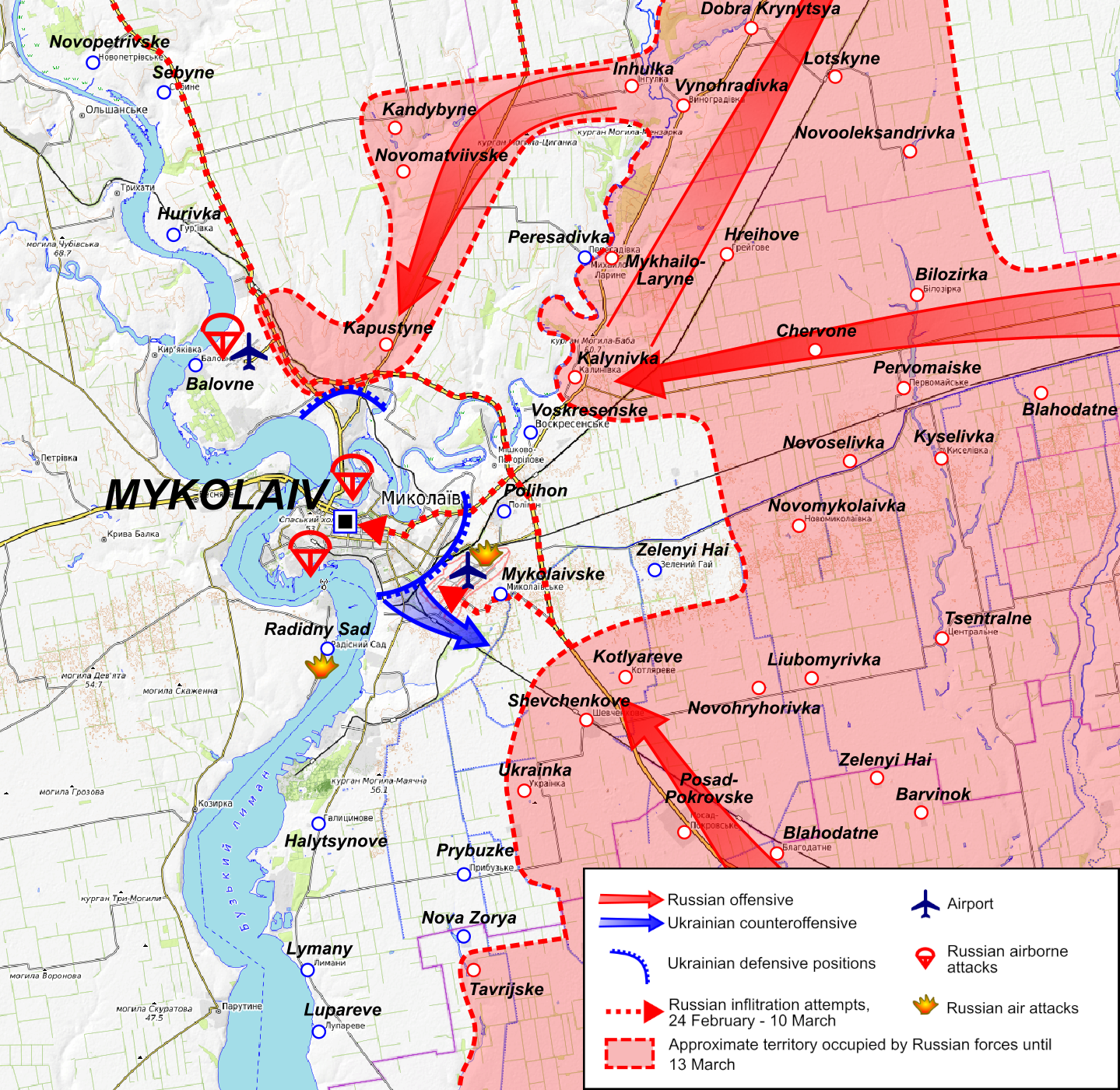
Illustration of the Battle of Mykolaiv. For the defense, Mykolaiv would receive the title of Hero City of Ukraine.

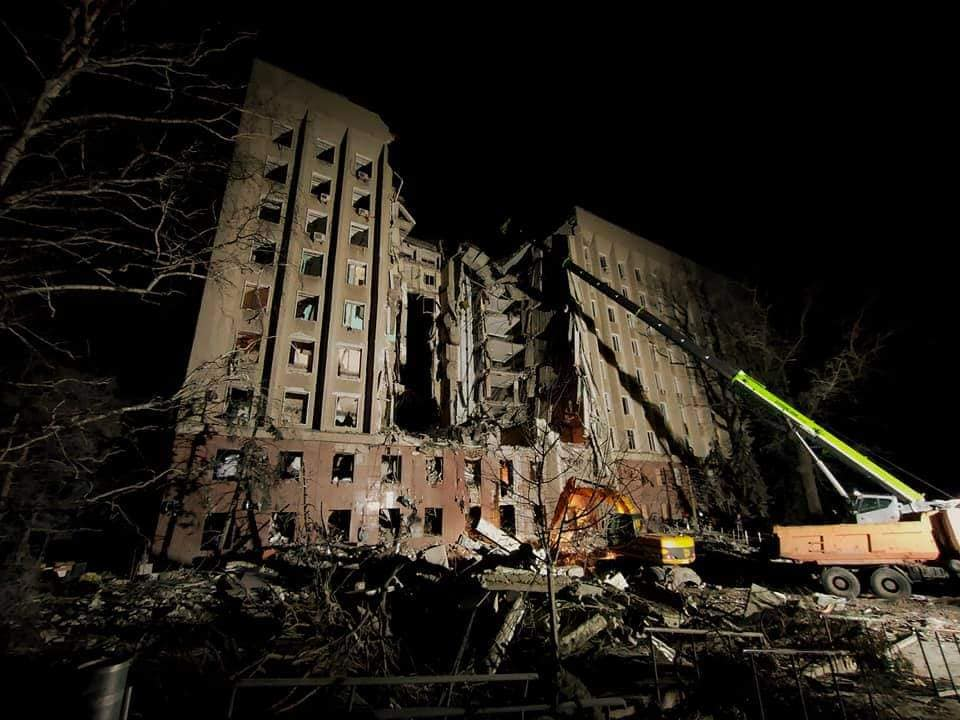
Mykolaiv Regional State Administration building after Russian shelling, March 2022.

==== Battle of Mykolaiv ====
The first strikes on Mykolaiv after the 2022 Russian invasion of Ukraine began on the morning of the invasion's first day, targeting the military stationed in Mykolaiv. The following day, Dmytro Marchenko was brought in to command the Ukrainian forces in the defense of the city, while Russian paratroopers began attempted landings in Mykolaiv and advancing tank columns from Kakhovka. That evening, Russian troops very briefly entereed the city along Tsentralnyi Avenue, but were forced to retreat to Kherson. They returned on 28 February to begin assaults on the city's outskirts, and by 2 March started attempting an encirclement of Mykolaiv via Balovne and Kalynivka. On 4 March, Russian troops broke in and seized Kulbakine Air Base, bringing the city into a semi-encirclement although later that day they were forced to retreat, after having lost much personnel. For two days, the Russians then began amassing equipment near Mykolaiv, before restarting heavy shelling and seizing areas near Mykolaiv Airport, before being driven back entirely, which was the last major attempt at capturing Mykolaiv.

Throughout the rest of the month, the city was heavily shelled by Russian forces. By 11 March, it was already reported there were at least 120 dead in the city, with the most massive strike on 29 March at the Mykolaiv Regional Military Administration building killing 37, who were mostly just civilian staff. In honour of the city's resistance, the President of Ukraine, Volodymyr Zelenskyy, awarded the city the title of "Hero City of Ukraine" to Mykolaiv on 24 March 2022. By early April 2022, Russian forces had nearly entirely left Mykolaiv Oblast. By July, half of the pre-war population had left the city. It was reported that by 2023 about 90% of the pre-war time population had returned.

==== Later developments and investments ====
Russian missile strikes have continued to hit the city post-battle. Ballistic missiles killed one and injured fifteen in November 2025, with smaller-scale attacks also repeatedly hitting Mykolaiv that year. Of particular concern during these strikes is of the water crisis in Mykolaiv. Following a Russian strike against the main waterline connecting Mykolaiv with Dnipro river on 12 April 2022, local inhabitants were left without access to centralized water supply for almost a month. This was because the "Dnipro-Mykolaiv" pipeline could not be properly fixed as some parts were under occupation in Kherson Oblast, while shelling of Mykolaiv's water treatment facilities has led to the switch to estuary water which has caused accelerated ruptures and corrosions. Later, water for the needs of the city's population was being procured from local rivers and boreholes were being used in reserve, although studies have warned that this could lead to contamination. On 7 October 2025 Oleksiy Kuleba, Minister of Communities and Territorial Development of Ukraine, officially reported, that centralized supply of freshwater to the city has been resumed after the completion of a new water pipeline.

Despite this, Mykolaiv has been the recipient of numerous international aid projects since the war started. Among the most significant early aid projects was with the UN Economic Commission for Europe as part of the "UN4UkrainianCities" programme, which worked with an Italian design firm on developing a masterplan for the city during wartime. Mykolaiv also received aid from USAID and the Ukrainian Red Cross Society. The most significant post-war aid project has been with the Danish government has invested nearly $250 million to help the city with multiple issues such as construction, education, green energy and vocational training since August 2022. As part of the first phase, Denmark allocated for regional reconstruction to the water supply and pumps of "Mykolaivvodokanal" and water-purification systems alongn with heating boilers. As of February 2025, about 60% of all Danish aid has gone to Mykolaiv specifically as part of the partnership. By the end of 2025, they had also helped co-finance a wind power plant for electricity, which was estimated to cost 400 million euros, and the institution Nefco also signed on to help with reconstruction in Mykolaiv. A later report by Centre for Eastern Studies (OSW) said that Denmark's interest in Mykolaiv's reconstruction specifically ties to later long-term cooperation on Mykolaiv's shipbuilding industry after the war.

== Sources ==
- Крючков, Ю. С. (1996). История Николаева от основания до наших дней. Возможности Киммерии.
- Именовать— город Николаев. Советский фонд культуры, Николаевское областное отделение. 1989.
- Лифанов, B. (1989). Николаев 1789–1989: Страницы истории. Маяк.
- Быченков, И. А. (1989). Николаеву 200 лет, 1789–1989: Сборник документов и материалов. Kyiv: Наукова думка.
- Левченко, Л. Л. (2020). Николаев в Восточной (Крымской) войне 1853–1856 гг. : Неизвестные архивные документы. Mykolaiv: Илион.
- Adams, Arthur E. (1963). Bolsheviks in the Ukraine: The Second Campaign, 1918-1919. Yale University Press.
