= Vasily Bazhenov =

Russian neoclassical architect (1737–1799)

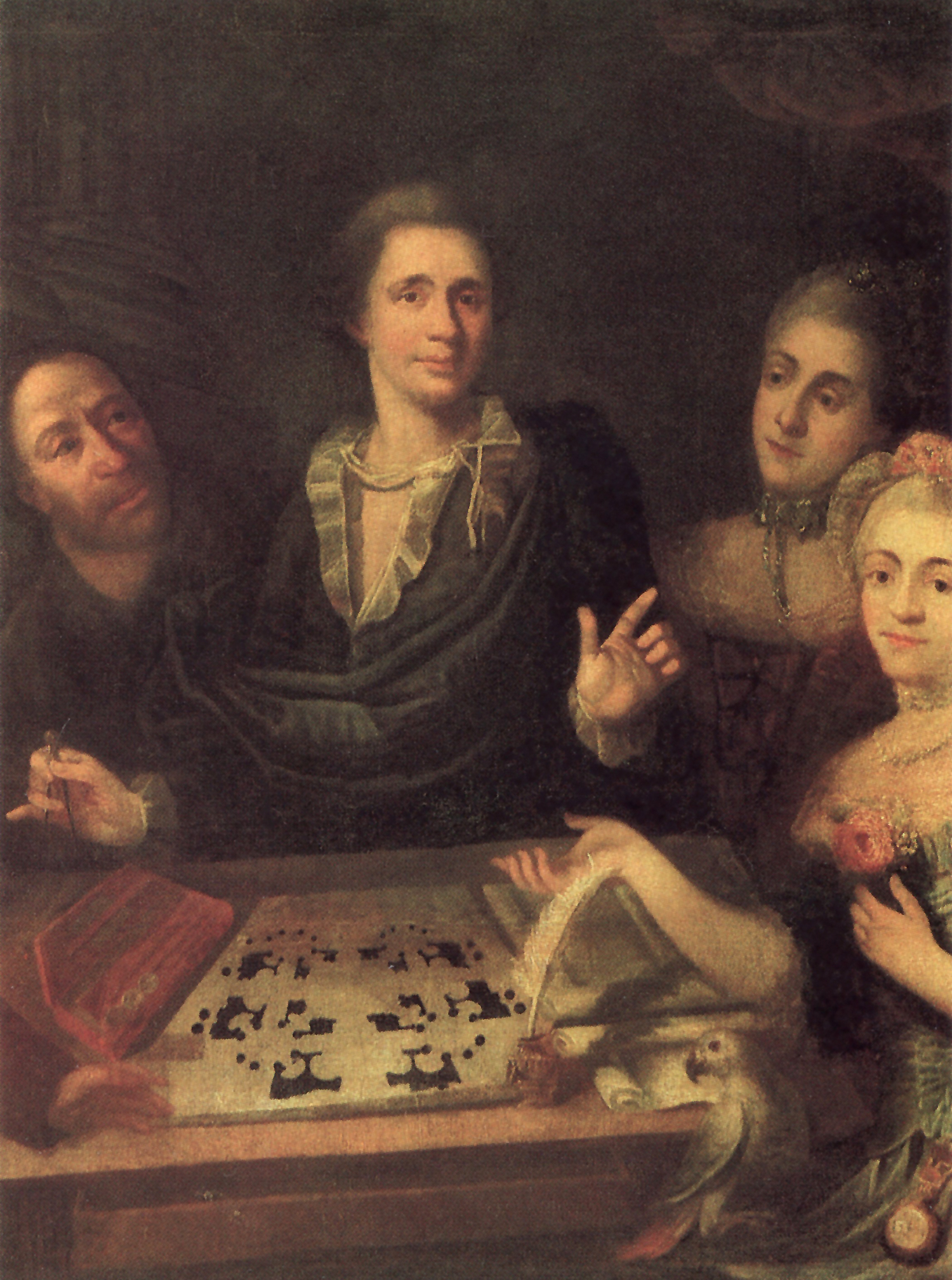
- Bazhenov and his family, 1770s
- Born: March 1, 1737; Moscow, Moscow Governorate, Russian Empire
- Died: August 13, 1799 (aged 62); Saint Petersburg, Russian Empire
- Education: Imperial Academy of Arts
- Known for: Architecture
- Notable work: Pashkov House, Tsaritsyno Park
- Elected: Member Academy of Arts (1765)

Vasily Ivanovich Bazhenov (Russian: Васи́лий Ива́нович Баже́нов; 12 March [O.S. 1 March] 1737 or 1738 – 13 August [O.S. 2 August] 1799) was a Russian neoclassical architect, graphic artist, architectural theorist and educator. Bazhenov and his associates Matvey Kazakov and Ivan Starov were the leading local architects of the Russian Enlightenment, a period dominated by foreign architects (Charles Cameron, Giacomo Quarenghi, Antonio Rinaldi and others). According to Dmitry Shvidkovsky, in the 1770s, Bazhenov became the first Russian architect to create a national architectural language since the 17th-century tradition interrupted by Peter the Great.

Bazhenov's early success was followed by a tragic professional and private life. His two main construction projects were abandoned for political or financial reasons. His magnum opus, the neoclassical Grand Kremlin Palace, was cancelled shortly after groundbreaking. The imperial palace in Tsaritsyno Park fell victim to the Battle of the Palaces; Bazhenov's palace core was demolished on the orders of Catherine II. Another project, for the Moscow State University building, ended in a bitter conflict with Bazhenov's former benefactor Prokofi Demidov and led Bazhenov into bankruptcy. Before his death, Bazhenov implored his children to stay aside from the treacherous construction business.

Bazhenov's legacy remains debated. The attributions of Pashkov House and lesser projects to Bazhenov, backed by a sketchy paper trail, deductions and conjectures, are uncertain to the point where his life and work became subject of conspiracy theories. Even his place of birth and the location of Bazhenov's grave are unknown. His life story, as reconstructed by Igor Grabar and popularized by the historians of the Soviet period, is regarded by modern critics as the "Bazhenov myth", and even most recent academic research fails to replace this myth with a reliable biography.

== Biography ==
=== Early career ===
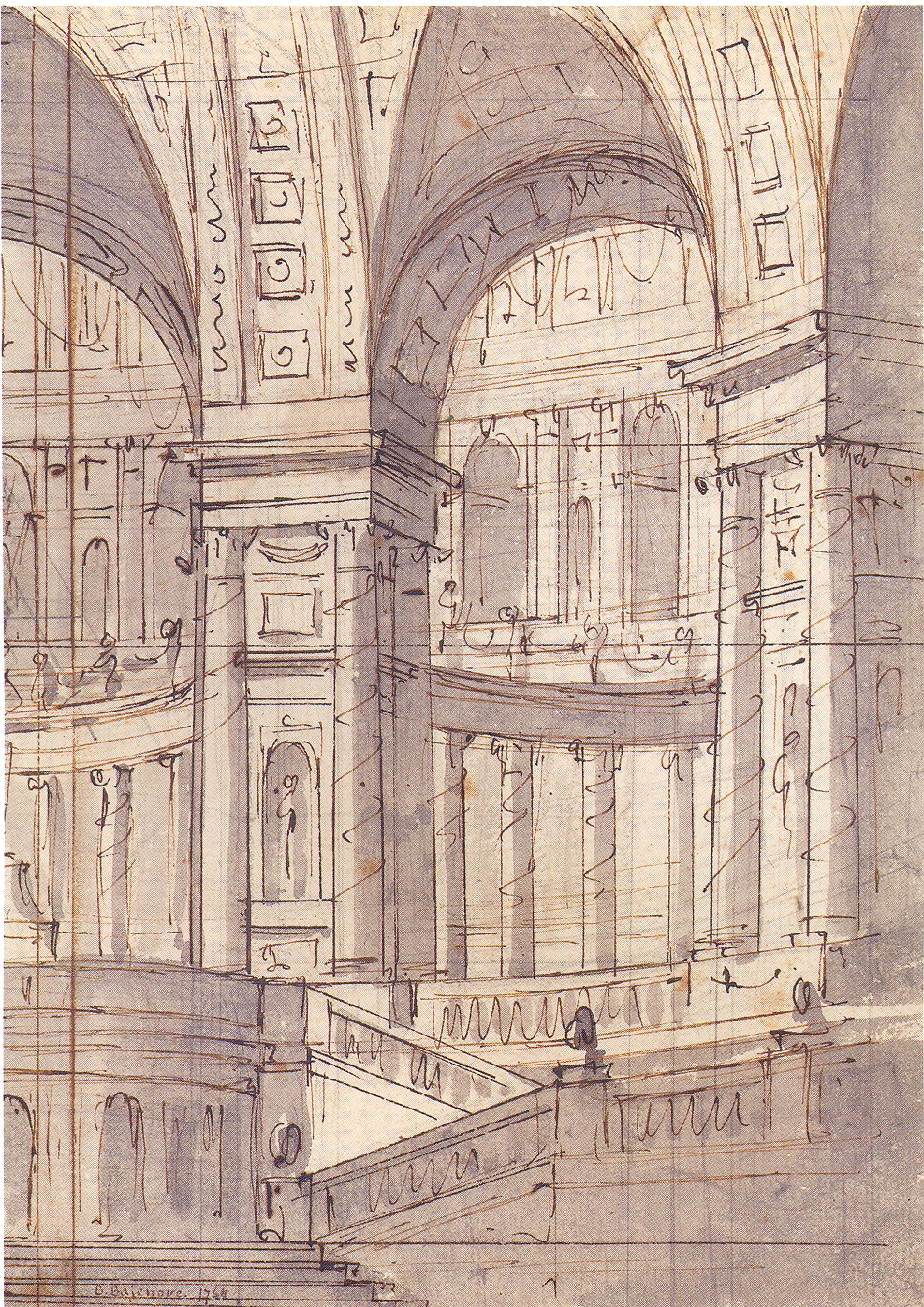
1764 artwork by Bazhenov

The exact year and place of Bazhenov's birth is uncertain; he was born in 1737 or 1738 in a family of a church clerk either in Moscow or in the village of Dolskoye near Maloyaroslavets. According to the second version, the family relocated to Moscow when Vasily was three months old. In 1753 Vasily volunteered (but was not formally hired) into the Kremlin-based architectural company of Dmitry Ukhtomsky, then the only Moscow institution providing basic architectural training. There Bazhenov acquired practical construction skills; poverty forced him to seek paid work instead of classroom training.

In 1755 Bazhenov joined the first class of the newly opened Moscow State University. Bazhenov's first biographer, Eugene Bolkhovitinov (1767–1837, Metropolitan of Kiev since 1822), wrote that Bazhenov also studied at the Slavic Greek Latin Academy but this opinion is firmly refuted by 20th century biographers. Bolkhovitinov, perhaps, knowingly twisted the facts to raise the prestige of clerical colleges.

In the beginning of 1758 the University, requested by Ivan Shuvalov, dispatched a group of sixteen students, including Bazhenov and Ivan Starov, to Saint Petersburg to continue training at the newly established Imperial Academy of Arts. They, along with twenty boys selected in Saint Petersburg, became the first class of the Academy. In May 1758 the class was reduced to thirty students (8 nobles and 22 raznochintsy); at the first exam, twenty-year-old Bazhenov ranked first, also being the oldest student; fourteen–year–old Starov ranked seventh while the youngest student, Stefan Karnovich, was only twelve. Bazhenov, according to his own statement, was assigned to the class of Savva Chevakinsky, chief architect of the Russian Admiralty, worked on the construction of the Saint Nicholas church and became a personal mentor and blood brother of younger Starov.

Three years later Bazhenov and painter Anton Losenko became the first students of the Academy of Arts to be awarded a scholarship out of Russia. Bazhenov trained in Paris at the workshop of Charles De Wailly (Starov joined him there in October 1762). Bazhenov's entries to the competitions of the French Academy of Architecture were a success; he "triumphantly concluded" the scholarship, being elected to the Roman Academy of Saint Luke, Academy of Fine Arts of Florence and Academy of Fine Arts of Bologna. Later, Bazhenov became the principal promoter of French neoclassicism in Russia and set the stylistic canon of neoclassical Moscow along the ideas of De Wailly.

He returned to Russia in May 1765 possessing "unusual and impeccable credentials for a Russian of that day" and applied for a degree and tenure at the Academy, but the new management had no intention to hire Bazhenov. He was subjected to a rigorous formal examination and was ordered to submit a new graduation project; he had no success with the Academy but was noticed by Catherine II and her son Paul, who commissioned Bazhenov to design and build a private mansion on Kamenny Island. At the end of 1766 Grigory Orlov, then commander of imperial artillery and military engineers, hired Baznenov into his retinue, in the military rank of captain of artillery, and commissioned him the Arsenal in Saint Petersburg. Next year, Bazhenov followed Orlov into Moscow where he would live for most of his remaining life "giving a Russian reality to French Classical and Italian Palladian modes to which he was exposed."

=== Kremlin Palace ===
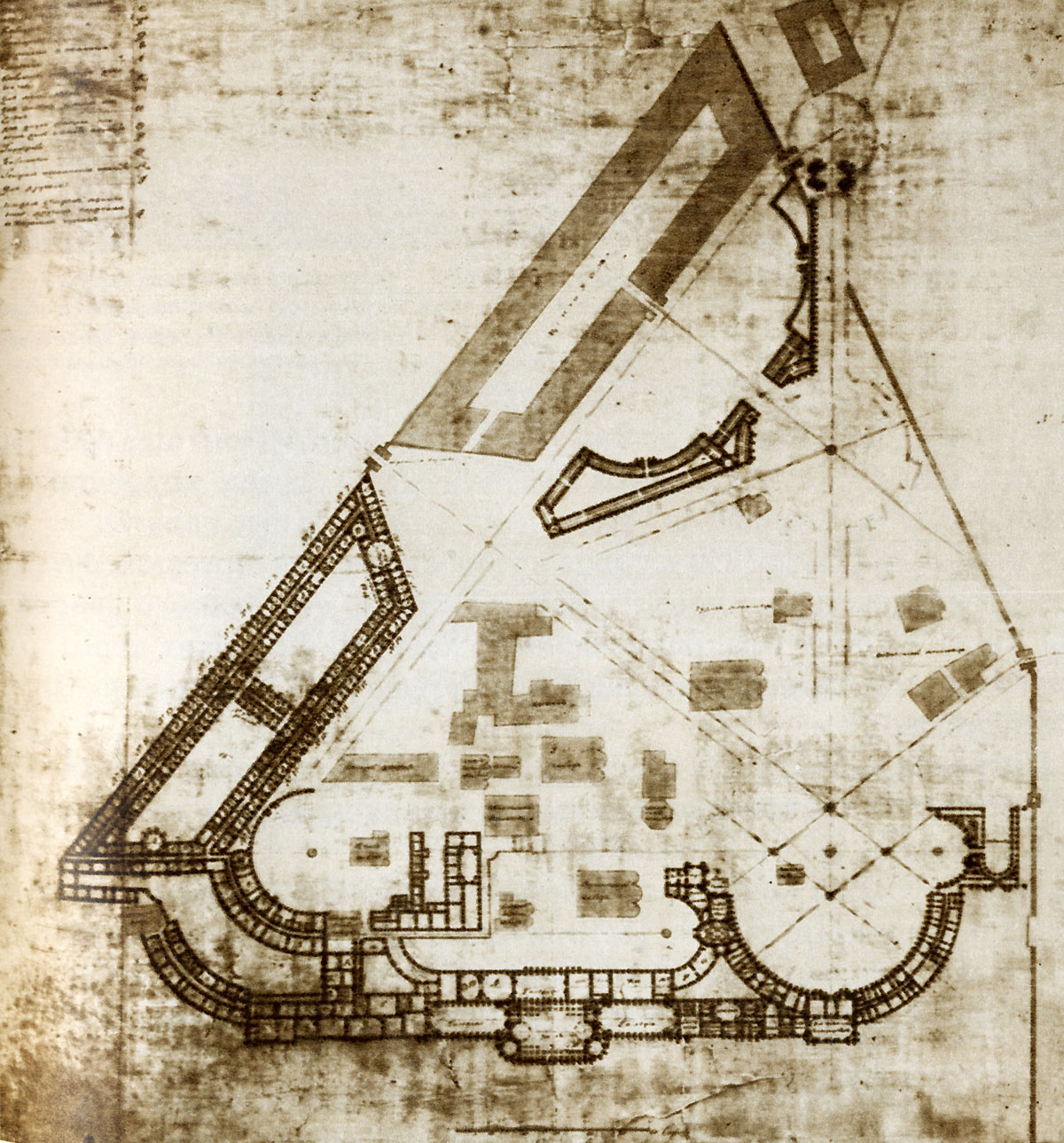
Final draft of the palace, 1770 or later (planned structures dark, older structures in light shading).

Catherine suggested the idea of rebuilding the decrepit palaces of the Moscow Kremlin into a new government center of the reformed country (in 1767 Moscow hosted an elected congress framing a new code of laws) and Bazhenov eagerly responded; as early as 1767 he produced first drafts of his opus magnum, the utopian Grand Kremlin Palace. Orlov, fascinated by the proposal, rightfully questioned the feasibility of the enormous edifice, but Baznenov went forward and finalized the design by the end of summer of 1768. The largest neoclassical complex in Europe, if ever completed, would have replaced the Kremlin itself, leaving only its cathedrals intact.

According to his plan, the new four–storey neoclassical palace would take up the whole southern side of the Kremlin - 2,100 feet or 630 meters from Konstantino-Yeleninskaya tower in the east to Borovitskaya Tower in the west, and extending north along the western wall of the Kremlin up to the Arsenal. The palace would have completely enclosed the Kremlin Cathedrals, obstructing their view from across the Moskva River. Instead of building the palace on the top plateau of the Kremlin Hill, Bazhenov placed it right on the steep slope between the plateau and the Kremlin wall slated for demolition, employing enormous stone buttresses to prevent it from sliding into the river. The river itself should have been cleaned up, regulated and flanked by an embankment sided with logs.

Layout of the new Kremlin "was the most inventive planning effort of Catherine's reign". Bazhenov retained the historical Cathedral Square and proposed creation of a new square in the eastern part of the Kremlin that would become the new center of Moscow and the start of three new radial streets projecting due north, north-west and north-east. The northern radius, passing through a planned opening in the Kremlin wall, would directly connect the palace with Tverskaya Street. Bazhenov expanded his planning into modernizing the city itself, which eventually led to the Projected Plan officially accepted in 1775, a joint effort led by Pyotr Kozhin and Nicholas Legrand.

Nikolay Karamzin wrote in 1817 that "plans of Bazhenov, the famous architect, are similar to Plato's Republic or More's Utopia: they should be admired in thought and never put into practice." Nevertheless, the project received a go–ahead and the government set up the Kremlin Construction Board (or Expedition in 18th century parlance), an institution that survived into the 19th century. The Expedition became a new architectural school for local students, starting with Bazhenov's aide Matvey Kazakov. Kazakov, working in Kremlin since 1768, became Bazhenov's equal after 1770 and took over management of the Expedition in 1786. He surpassed Bazhenov as educator, revitalized Ukhtomsky school and trained Joseph Bove, Ivan Yegotov and Aleksey Bakarev.

At the groundbreaking ceremony (1773) Bazhenov declared that "today we renew old Moscow". Work commenced by shaving of the southern slope of the Kremlin Hill and laying foundation for the supporting buttresses. Central part of the southern wall of Kremlin, Taynitskaya and First Unnamed towers were demolished. Earth pit began right next to the Cathedral of the Archangel and for the next year Bazhenov and his engineers struggled with the threat of landslides. In 1775 Catherine shut down the project, citing damage to the Cathedral of the Archangel and the unsuitable geology of the Kremlin Hill. Historians reason that she had other, more important concerns: enormous cost of the palace and reluctance to invest in Moscow, an old city that she perceived as a threat to her control and modernization of the Empire, the demise of constitutional assembly or the simple fact that by 1775 "Catherine had nothing more to prove."

The original wooden model of the planned palace (1:44 scale, 17 meters long), made by Bazhenov's students is preserved at the Moscow Museum of Architecture. When the museum was based at the Donskoy monastery the model was publicly displayed in its main cathedral. In 2001 City of Moscow proposed building a dedicated museum pavilion to display the model in Alexander Garden but the proposal was rejected.

=== Tsaritsyno ===
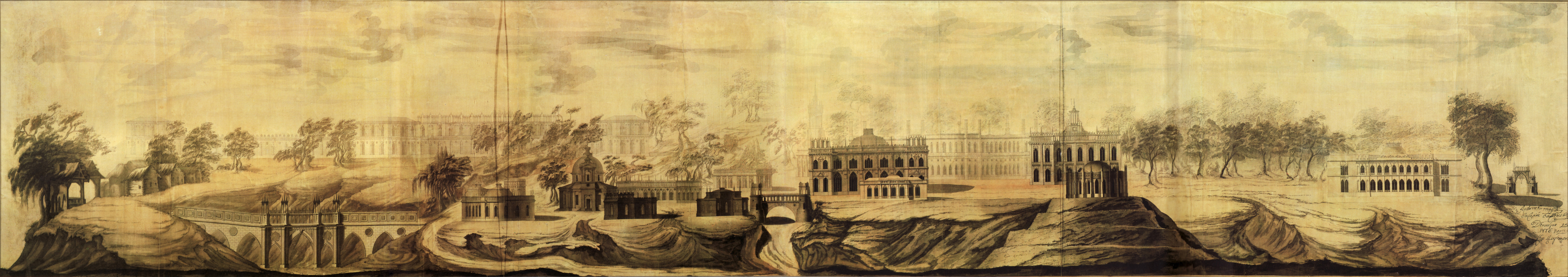
Bazhenov's 1776 panorama of Tsaritsyno

Bazhenov, at least in the first half of Catherine's reign, perfectly understood her taste and stylistic program, that of Age of Enlightenment rather than of Neoclassicism. During the 1775 celebrations of the Treaty of Küçük Kaynarca on the Khodynka Field, Bazhenov "turned imitation of English Gothic Revival into an attempt to create a universal stylistic language for Russian architecture combining typical elements of medieval buildings of both East and West, motifs from Antiquity and pure fantasy." This ephemeral work paved way to Catherine's decision to build two imperial palaces in Moscow suburbs (in 1775 she lived in a temporary wooden building in Kolomenskoye). The lesser Petrovsky Palace on the road to Saint Petersburg was awarded to Kazakov, the larger Tsaritsyno to Bazhenov.

In summer of 1775 Bazhenov designed the first draft of Tsaritsyno, now lost. It followed Catherine's affection to "peasant style", featuring numerous neo-Gothic, country style lodges scattered on a carefully planned "natural" landscape. The same approach was employed in the second, "completely non-classical" master plan approved by Catherine in spring of 1776. This time Bazhenov added a dominant main palace, designed as two identical buildings connected with a greenhouse. One wing was intended for Catherine, another for her son and heir Paul. Bazhenov planned to decorate Tsaritsyno with traditional Russian coloured tiles, izraztsy, but Catherine objected and insisted on a simpler red (brick walls), white (ornaments) and yellow (glazed roof tiles) colour scheme. Roof tiles did not last long in Russian winters and were soon replaced with sheet iron.

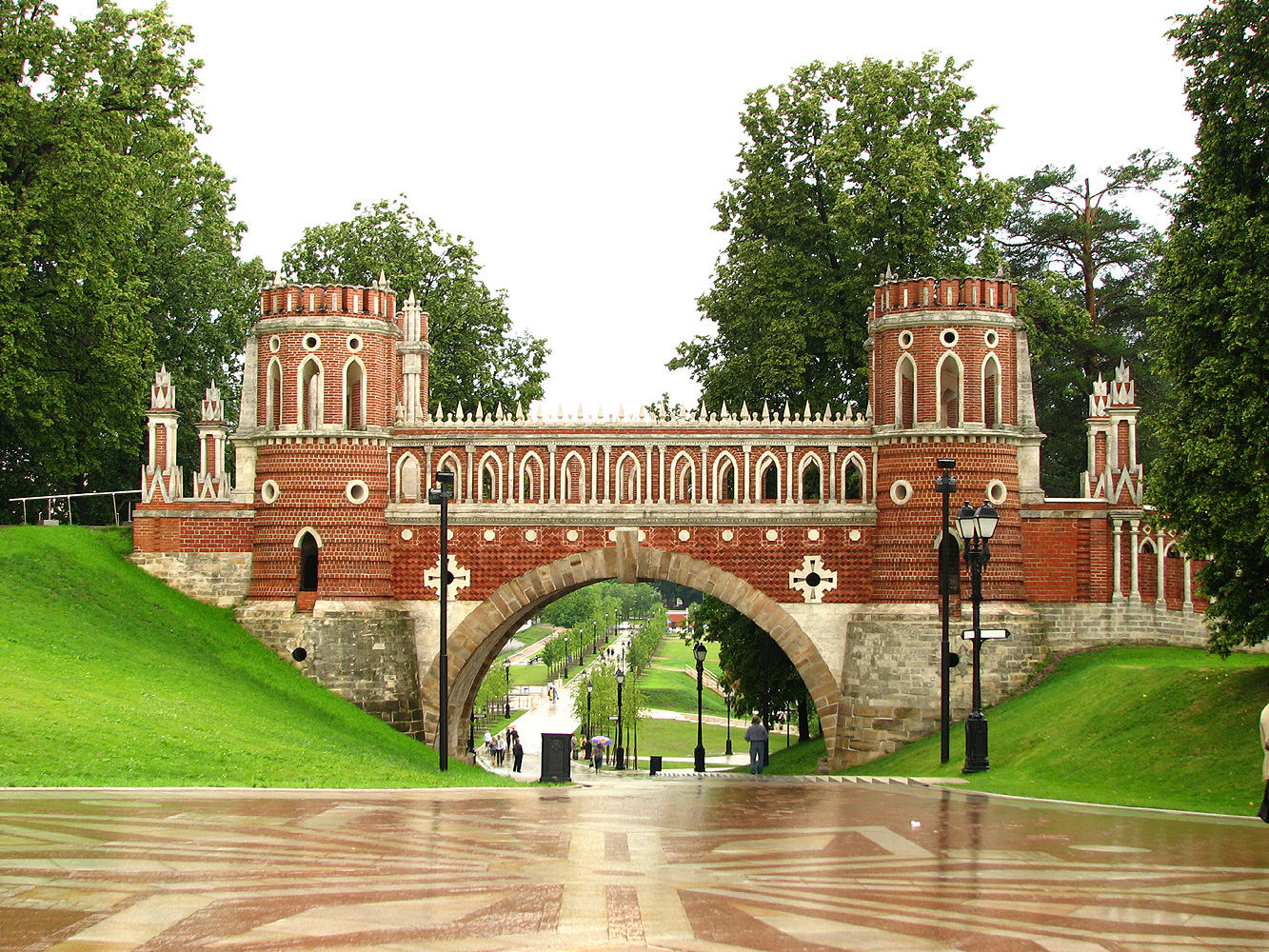
Figurny Bridge, the earliest completed structure (1776), also features the finest ornamental work.

Bazhenov began construction with the "front row" of small buildings, gates and bridges. Their white stone inserts feature finely carved ornaments that disappeared in later buildings either due to shortage in skilled craftsmen or Bazhenov's own stylistic decision. In 1777 Bazhenov demolished the old wooden manor house of the Cantemirs, former owners of Tsaritsyno, and started construction of the main palace. Shortage of government funds plagued the project from the start; in fact, most of Bazhenov's written legacy consists of business letters pleading the state treasury for money, skilled labor, and counting his private debts incurred in Tsaritsyno. In 1783 he actively sought new jobs, writing that "he was now quite free in Tsaritsyno."

The main palace, with an added central annex for Paul's children, was built in eight years. Governor Jacob Bruce, who inspected Tsaritsyno in 1784, was puzzled by the absence of a formal front courtyard, but nevertheless sent Catherine an enthusiastic report praising, in particular, bridges and landscaping. Catherine suddenly visited Tsaritsyno in June 1785, and left displeased by slow pace of the work; she scorned the palace in letters to Paul and Melchior Grimm as a "dark place with low vaults and narrow stairs, unfit for living."

By 1785 Bazhenov's palace layout became politically incorrect: relations between Catherine and Paul irreversibly worsened, the empress entertained removing Paul from the order of succession completely, and twin palaces had to make way for a single one – her own. Catherine announced her will to demolish and rebuild the main palace, but Bazhenov was not fired immediately; he and Kazakov were ordered to submit independent redesign proposals. Bazhenov presented a new design in the end of 1785, but it was rejected and Bazhenov was dismissed from the project "to improve his health and household matters". In February 1786 Catherine finally awarded Tsaritsyno project to Kazakov; Bazhenov's palace was demolished in summer of 1786. Public opinion incorrectly connected her anger to Bazhenov's association with the Free Masons or his Gothic styling; in fact, Kazakov retained both Gothic and Masonic features and most of Bazhenov's auxiliary buildings survived to date.

=== Demidov affair ===
By the middle of 1780s Catherine, once fascinated by the art of Bazhenov and Charles Cameron, settled for the different version of neoclassicism professed by Kazakov in Moscow and Starov and Quarenghi in Saint Petersburg. In December 1786 Bazhenov finally retired from state service and had to rely on private commissions alone. The extent of these private jobs, once considered to be numerous (see attribution problem) has been subsequently revised to a very small number of more or less reliably attributed buildings; in contrast, Matvey Kazakov's legacy of the same period has been documented far better. Shvidkovsky noted that Bazhenov set the style of neoclassical Moscow but it was Kazakov and his alumni who actually designed and built it. According to Shvidkovsky, residential Moscow before the fire of 1812 was influenced, through Bazhenov, by works of Charles de Wailly and his circle; Bazhenov enhanced the French style with use of sculpture and garden architecture. Kazakov lacked Bazhenov's refinement but his buildings "were considerably more practical than Bazhenov's, more adapted to Moscow life."

Bazhenov, eager to improve his finances, accepted what looked like a generous offer from Prokofi Demidov, a wealthy and whimsical patron of arts. Demidov planned to donate a new building to Moscow University; he agreed to refinance Bazhenov's debts in exchange for his design and management services. Relations soon turned sour; Demidov, literally having Bazhenov in his pocket, rejected his design for a downtown campus and ordered Bazhenov to design a new green field campus on the Sparrow Hills. This cat and mouse game (as presented in Bazhenov's own writing) continued for nearly a decade; the architect wasted years on a dead end project and remained bankrupt at the mercy of Demidov. Once again Kazakov picked up the job and completed the "old" downtown core of the University in 1793.

In 1792 Bazhenov relocated to Saint Petersburg and accepted an uninspiring but stable job of an architect of Kronstadt admiralty; in his spare time he translated the complete works of Vitruvius. In April 1792 Bazhenov was implicated in the Nikolay Novikov affair; police found Bazhenov's letter to Novikov about supplying masonic books to Paul. Novikov spent four years in Schlisselburg fortress jail while Bazhenov escaped free. Masonic influence over Bazhenov's life and art led to him being called "the Russian Christopher Wren" and the theory that he was a long-term agent of martinists tasked with winning Paul's support. Paul was aware of Bazhenov's real or alleged mission but by 1792 he stepped aside from freemasonry and personally warned Bazhenov against further conspiracies.

=== Late recognition ===
Emperor Paul I of Russia supported Bazhenov as one of the alleged victims of his despised mother. Shortly upon ascension to the throne (1796) Paul summoned Bazhenov to Saint Petersburg and made him vice-president of the Imperial Academy of Arts. The Academy of this period, influenced by the ideas of its second President Ivan Betskoy, admitted boys at the age of six to nine years old, and provided nine-year general (elementary and secondary) education followed by at least six years of professional training in arts and architecture. Bazhenov believed that the Academy must dispose with elementary education and focus on its core subjects, admitting literate teenagers who could prove their talent in an open contest. He did not live enough to materialize this program; it was gradually implemented by Alexander Stroganov (1802) and Alexey Olenin (1830).

Paul's main construction project, Saint Michael's Castle, was awarded to his house architect, Italian Vincenzo Brenna, while Bazhenov was appointed to supervise Brenna. Historians of the 19th and early 20th centuries could not clearly separate the input of each architect and attributed the design to Brenna and Bazhenov jointly. Nikolay Lanceray (1930s) and subsequent Russian historians give full credit to Brenna; according to Lanceray, Bazhenov did not interfere in Brenna's designs that were, to a large extent, Brenna's renditions of Paul's own romantic vision. According to Dmitry Shvidkovsky, Bazhenov worked on an earlier design of the castle and this fact was later interpreted as his participation in actual design; Brenna "was given the task of adapting Bazhenov's design" but created an independent work. At any rate, Bazhenov died in the middle of the project leaving Brenna in full control; the castle turned out not a Neoclassical building, but "a rare example of an imperial palace genuinely redolent of the Romantic era."

Paul also commissioned Bazhenov to design a new hospital near Danilov Monastery. Bazhenov, again, responded with an extravagant plan that did not proceed past wooden frame and was replaced by Kazakov's extant Pavlovskaya Hospital built in 1802–1807. Shortly before his death Bazhenov began compilation of an album on Russian Architecture, collecting drafts of "all large buildings in two capitals."

== Attribution problem ==
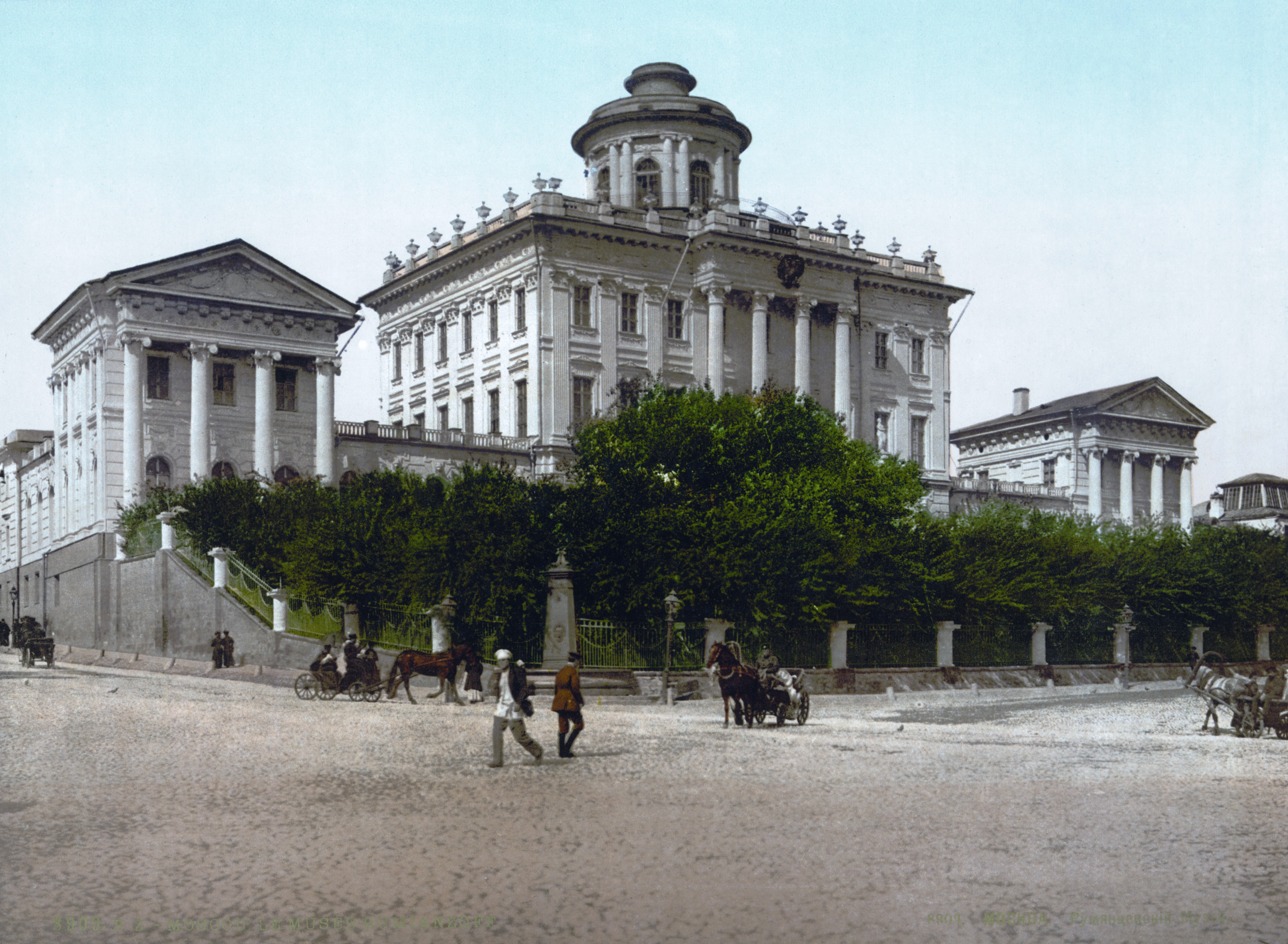
Pashkov House

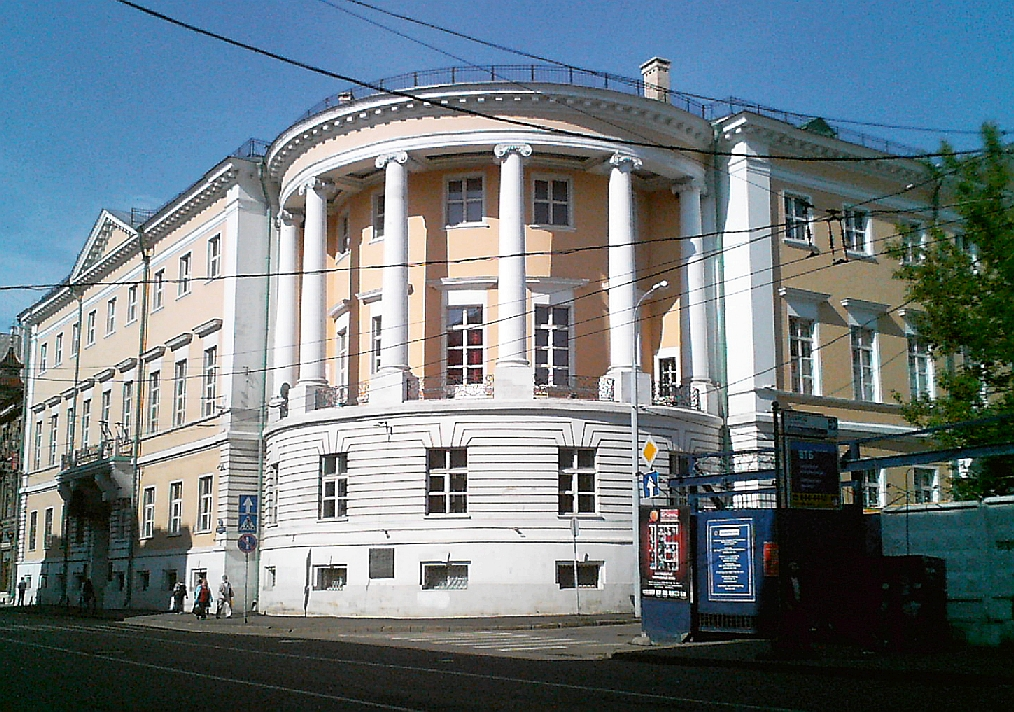
Yushkov House

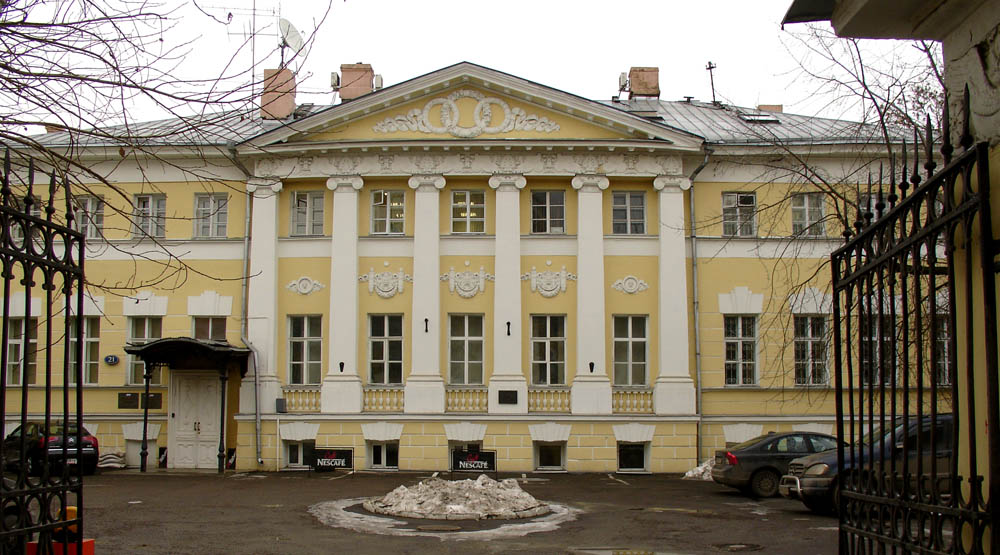
Dolgov House

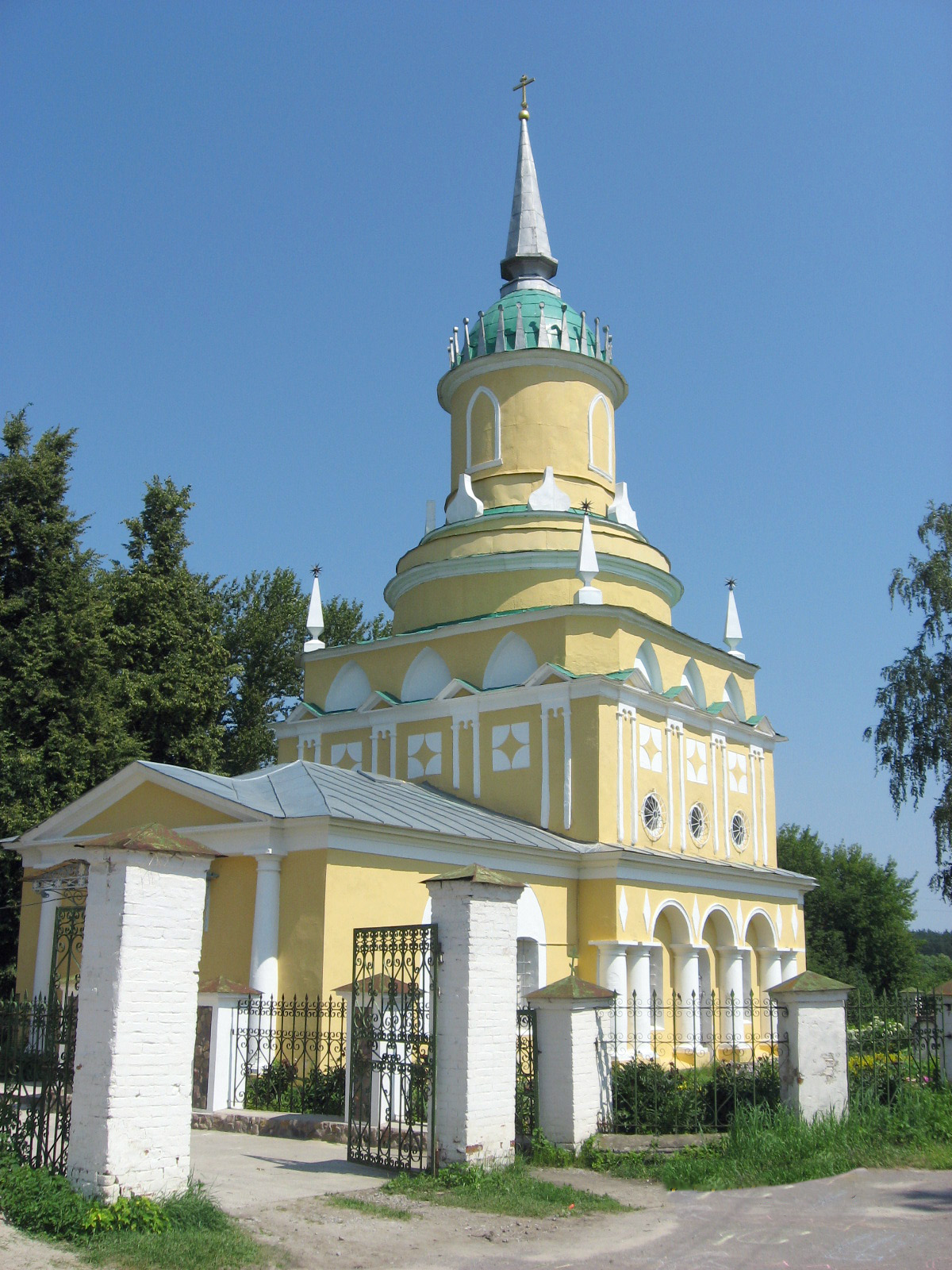
Church in Starki

Reliable attribution of private 18th-century buildings in Russia, even those that retained original styling and floorplans, is rarely possible. Wealthy patrons eagerly hired architects who made themselves famous by working on government megaprojects, but in many instances original drawings are missing. In these cases historians used general design features or specific features to deduce probable author. Uncertainty led to frequent misattribution, particularly in case of Bazhenov and Kazakov and subsequent changes in attribution or admitting inability to make one.

=== Buildings in Moscow ===
Attribution of specific Moscow buildings to Bazhenov in this article is based on the academic Pamyatniki arhitektury Moskvy (Russian: Памятники архитектуры Москвы) series of books issued in 1983–2007.

Tradition of the first half of the 20th century, started by Igor Grabar, credited Bazhenov with designing numerous high-profile private buildings in Moscow. Later research has shown that in most cases his input cannot be reliable ascertained. Pashkov House, most likely, has been designed by Bazhenov while other residences once credited to him are now listed under "unknown architect" heading.

- Pashkov House, Bazhenov's most conspicuous extant building and "one of Moscow's most graceful and handsome residential ensembles" is attributed to him "through the 19th century tradition supported by the majority of <20th century> researchers". Pashkov House, uniquely to 18th-century architecture, retains its original external appearance and layout as conceived by the architect around 1784 and completed in 1787. The building was severely damaged by the Fire of 1812 and, for the first time in the history of Moscow, was rebuilt exactly to original drafts in recognition of its landmark significance.
- Yushkov House on Myasnitskaya Street in Moscow (late 1780s – early 1790s) is simply "attributed" to Bazhenov. According to Schmidt, it represented architect's turn from French neoclassicism to Italianate architecture. Layout of this building, featuring a corner rotunda, became a widely copied standard for neoclassical architects in Moscow. The building later housed Palace School of Architecture and Moscow School of Painting, Sculpture and Architecture (1844–1918), VKHUTEMAS (1918–1930) and, since 1989, Russian Academy of Painting, Sculpture and Architecture.
- Razumovsky House on Vozdvizhenka Street, another corner rotunda completed in 1799, has been attributed to Bazhenov by Schmidt, but Russian sources agree on inability to ascertain architect's identity.
- Tutolmin House in Tagansky District has been attributed to Bazhenov by Igor Grabar; later researchers attributed it to Starov. Prior to rebuilding in 1900s, the building's landmark role rivalled that of Pashkov House. Same attribution uncertainty applied to now demolished Prozorovsky House on Bolshaya Polyanka Street, "one of most charming estate houses in this street."
- The Dolgov House in Bolshaya Ordynka Street, has been once attributed to Bazhenov based on the fact that his wife was related to the owner of the building. This opinion has been since discarded.
- The belltower of the Church of All Sorrows in Bolshaya Ordynka Street, across Dolgov House, is unconditionally attributed to Bazhenov while the church itself has been built by Joseph Bove in 1828–1833.
- Panukhina (1994) suggested that Bazhenov could have been involved in the late stages of construction of Moscow Kriegskomissariat (present-day headquarters of Moscow Military District) in Zamoskvorechye, designed by Nicholas Legrand.

=== Country estates and churches ===
Even less certainty applies to attribution of country estates and churches:

- The best known of these, in Bykovo, belonged to Mikhail Izmailov, Governor of Moscow and Bazhenov's direct superior. Probable extant Bazhenov's works there include the main mansion and neo-Gothic church of Saint Vladimir, while most of 18th-century buildings have been lost.
- A church in Starki (present-day Kolomensky District), estate of prince Cherkassky, built in 1759–1763, was one of the first Gothic Revival buildings in Russia. If attribution to Bazhenov is correct, he designed it while still a student at the Academy of Arts.
- Church of Annunciation in Polivanovo, former Razumovsky estate, is "typical to Bazhenov" which fact remains the sole ground for attribution.
- Neoclassical Church of Theotokos of Vladimir in Dolgoprudny (1772–1777), with an unusual triangular layout, has been attributed to either Kazakov or Bazhenov despite complete lack of written evidence. Layout of the church is most likely inspired by the Temple of War by Jean-Francois Nefforge.

== Sources ==
- Konstantin Akinsha; Grigorii Kozlov; Sylvia Hochfield (2007). The Holy Place: Architecture, Ideology, and History in Russia. Yale University Press. p. 134. ISBN 978-0-300-11027-2. "shchuko."
- Cracraft, James Cracraft; Rowland, Daniel Bruce (2003). Architectures of Russian Identity: 1500 to the Present. Cornell University Press. ISBN 978-0-8014-8828-3.
- Bazhenov, Vasily (2001). Vasily Bazhenov. Pisma. Poyasneniya k proektam Баженов Василий Иванович. Письма. Пояснения к проектам. Свидетельства современников (in Russian). Iskusstvo. ISBN 5-85200-325-5.
- Lanceray, Nikolay (2006). Vincenzo Brenna (Винченцо Бренна) (in Russian). Saint Petersburg: Kolo. ISBN 5-901841-34-4. Note: the book was written in 1935–1938 and first printed in 2006.
- Lisovsky, Vladimir (2006). Leonty Benua i peterburgskaya shkola ("Леонтий Бенуа и петербургская школа художников-архитекторов") (in Russian). Saint Petersburg: Kolo. ISBN 5-901841-44-1.
- Murrell, Kathleen Berton (2001). Discovering the Moscow countryside: a travel guide to the heart of Russia. I.B.Tauris. ISBN 978-1-86064-673-7.
- Pamyatniki arhitektury Moskvy (Памятники архитектуры Москвы) series, in Russian:

Pamyatniki arhitektury Moskvy. Kreml (Памятники архитектуры Москвы. Кремль, Китай-город и центральные площади). Iskusstvo. 1983.
Pamyatniki arhitektury Moskvy. Bely Gorod (Памятники архитектуры Москвы. Белый город). Iskusstvo. 1989: Pamyatniki arhitektury Moskvy. Zemlyanoy Gorod (Памятники архитектуры Москвы. Земляной город). Iskusstvo. 1989: Pamyatniki arhitektury Moskvy. Zamoskvorechye (Памятники архитектуры Москвы. Замоскворечье). Iskusstvo. 1994. ISBN 5-210-02548-9
Pamyatniki arhitektury Moskvy. Okrestnosti staroy Moskvy (Памятники архитектуры Москвы. Окрестности старой Москвы (северо-западная и северная части города)). Iskusstvo. 2004. ISBN 5-98051-011-7
Pamyatniki arhitektury Moskvy. Okrestnosti staroy Moskvy (Памятники архитектуры Москвы. Окрестности старой Москвы (юго-восточная и южная части города)). Iskusstvo. 2007. ISBN 978-5-98051-041-1

- Panukhina, N. B. (1994). "Izyasnenie Vasilia Bazhenova (Изъяснение Василия Баженова)". Rossiysky Arkhiv (in Russian). 1: 24–26.
- Ritsarev, Marina (2006). Eighteenth-century Russian music. Ashgate Publishing, Ltd. ISBN 978-0-7546-3466-9.
- Schmidt, Albert J. (1989). The architecture and planning of classical Moscow: a cultural history. DIANE Publishing. ISBN 978-0-87169-181-1.
- Shvidkovsky, D. S. (2007). Russian architecture and the West. Yale University Press. ISBN 978-0-300-10912-2.
- Voronov, Victor (2008). Ivan Starov (Иван Старов) (in Russian). Saint Petersburg: Iskusstvo-SPB. ISBN 978-5-210-01511-2.
