= Battle of the Palaces =

Russian architectural conflict in the late 1700s

Catherine	Paul	Alexander

The "Battle of the Palaces" occurred in the Russian Empire in the last decade of the reign of Catherine II (1784–1796) and the reign of Paul I (1796–1801), with ripple effects extending into the beginning of the reign of Alexander I. A bitter standoff between Catherine and Paul, her only legitimate son and heir, manifested itself in transient political and ideological conflicts, but also had a lasting, tangible impact on Russian architecture. Both parties materialized their political statements and their understanding of sovereign power in expensive construction projects involving the most illustrious architects of the period–Vasily Bazhenov, Vincenzo Brenna, Charles Cameron, Matvey Kazakov, Giacomo Quarenghi, and Ivan Starov. Catherine's palace projects followed the neoclassical canon of the Age of Enlightenment, while Paul deliberately leaned toward emerging Romanticism. Buildings that stylistically fell apart from these programs were demolished or rebuilt without hesitation. The "battle" began in 1785 with the demolition of the main palace in Tsaritsyno, and culminated in 1796 with the demolition of Pella, the largest imperial palace in the Saint Petersburg area.

== Background ==
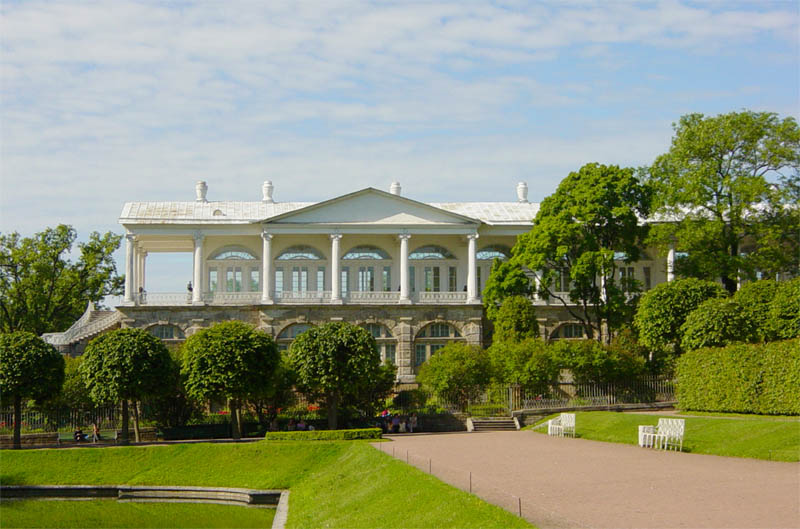
Cameron's Gallery (1784–1787) in Tsarskoye Selo, is an example of Catherine's taste in architecture in the last decade of her reign.

Until 1722, the order of succession in Russia was based on primogeniture. In 1722, Peter I parted with tradition and enacted the monarch's right (and, in fact, obligation) to name his or her successor at will. The change was followed by a series of palace coups; for most of the remaining 18th century, the throne was occupied by women: Catherine I, Anna, Elizabeth, and Catherine II. Catherine II ascended to the throne through the murder of her husband, Peter III, when their only legitimate son, Paul, was seven years old. Paul retained an affection for his late father throughout his life; however, with age, this feeling mutated into hatred for his mother.

At the beginning of Catherine's reign, Paul was vital for her survival, being the living symbol of dynastic continuity; however, by 1772, as Paul was coming of age, he began displaying a desire to participate in government, thus potentially challenging his mother's absolute power. Catherine thus devised a plan to remove Paul from any involvement in politics: Paul had to marry, retire to quiet family life, and produce a son that might become a better candidate for succession. This son, future emperor Alexander I, was born in 1777, and Catherine eagerly prepared him for an illustrious future, although she never elevated her choice to a level of monarch's written will. Paul, in turn, grew more and more suspicious of anything done by his mother, and even almost boycotted Alexander's 1793 wedding ceremony. The political struggle between Catherine and Paul, which initially "had secret significance hidden from the uninitiated but known to the court", soon became public, being well known not only to Saint Petersburg but also to numerous foreign courts.

Catherine began changing the architecture of Russia upon her ascension to the throne. She embraced two concepts, architecture as an allegory of her political ideas, and architecture as a policy for implementing these ideas. Her tastes developed in stages, from French Rococo to Gothic Revival, until finally settling on Palladianism in the 1780s. Catherinian neoclassicism was based on French models leaning toward ancient Roman forms. The choice also reflected Catherine's lifelong Greek Project, the drive to take over the Black Sea Straits from the Ottomans and re-establish the Byzantine Empire with her grandson Constantine as emperor.

Paul, who detested Catherinian Enlightenment, considered classic architecture a dry, emotionally inadequate reproduction of antiques. Dmitry Shvidkovsky pointed to a 1782 meeting between Paul and a French artist and antiquary Charles-Louis Clérisseau at Château de Chantilly as the event that could have shaped Paul's architectural tastes. Clerisseau, who knew he was admired by the empress, reprimanded the Russian heir-apparent for not paying him attention before and promised to report Paul's "disrespect" to Catherine; little else could hurt Paul's feelings more. The bitter exchange sealed Paul's tastes in favor of emerging Romanticism and, at the same time, French Baroque, and sowed the seed for the "Battle of the Palaces".

== First strike ==
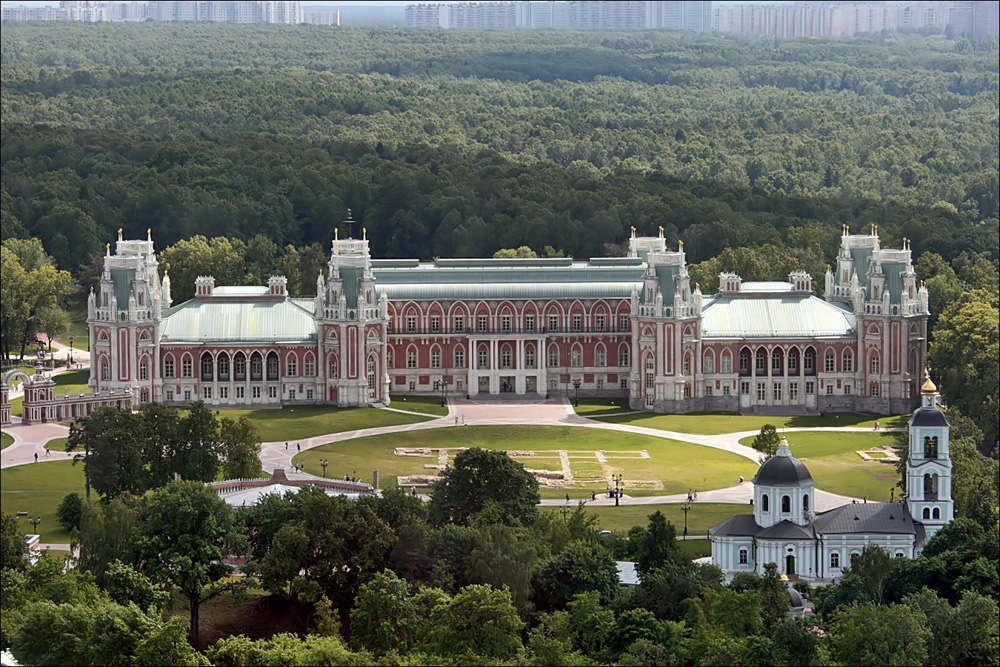
The main palace of Tsaritsyno Park - Matvey Kazakov's core reconstructed during 2005–2007.

In 1775, Catherine approved Vasily Bazhenov's drafts of Tsaritsynno Palace, but upon actually seeing the nearly complete structure on June 14 [O.S. June 3] 1785, she found it highly displeasing, scorned Bazhenov and ordered immediate demolition. In her June 19 [O.S. June 8] 1785 letter to Paul, she only mentioned that "Kremlin Senate and Tsaritsyno are not ready yet". The mechanism of destruction was already underway, although at a slow pace. Catherine signed a formal decree to raze Bazhenov's palaces and authorized Matvey Kazakov's drafts on February 17 [O.S. February 6] 1786.

Neither Bazhenov's affiliation with free masons, nor his Gothic Revival architecture was at fault. Bazhenov, however, made a mistake by sticking to the 1775 plans that provided for two identical palaces for Catherine and Paul centered around the public core building. In 1775, the equality of mother and son was in line with Catherine's policy, but by 1785, their relations were irreversibly strained. Catherine dismissed Bazhenov and invited Kazakov to rebuild the palace with only one main building–her own. It was structurally completed in the 1790s but abandoned after Catherine's death. It stood in ruins for over two centuries and was rebuilt into a modern convention center in 2005 until 2007.

== Pavlovsk ==
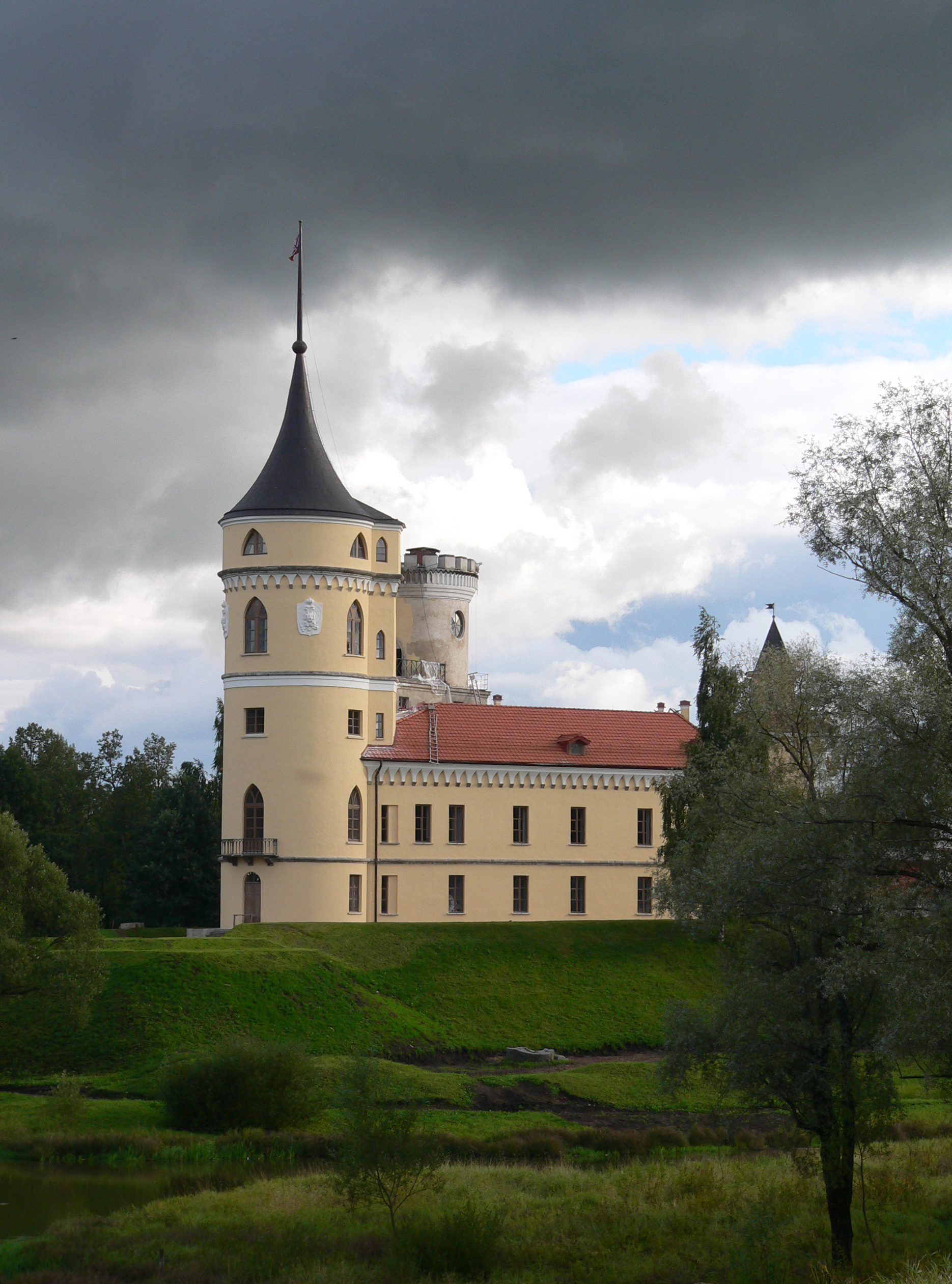
Bip Fortress (Paul's folly) in Pavlovsk

Pavlovsk, Paul's (and later Maria Feodorovna's) estate since 1777, was designed and built by Scottish-born Palladian neoclassicist Charles Cameron. Paul disliked Cameron simply because he was his mother's protégé. Cameron's Pavlovsk was far from Paul's vision of what an imperial residence should be: it lacked moats, forts and all other military paraphernalia so dear to Paul; "Cameron created a markedly private world for the Grand Duke. The palace could have belonged to anyone... not to the tsar of Russia in waiting." In 1786, while demolition crews in Tsaritsino were razing Bazhenov's towers, Paul dismissed Cameron and replaced him with Vincenzo Brenna.

Paul personally hired Brenna, then employed by Stanisław Kostka Potocki, in 1782, and used him in 1783 until 1785 to visualize his architectural fantasies; the heir and the architect developed a particular spiritual bond, sharing the same philosophy of art: "Paul was the first emperor of the Romantic era, Brenna was the precursor of Romantic Neoclassicism." Brenna left Cameron's palace core intact, extending it with side wings; although he remodeled the interiors, they bear traces of Cameron's style to date. However, Maria's private suite and the militaria displayed in public halls are attributed to Brenna alone. More importantly, Brenna "militarized" the setting by building a Gothic folly, Bip fortress, on the ruins of actual Swedish forts of the Great Northern War. Paul was so fascinated with Bip that he listed the folly on the Army register of real fortresses.

After the death of Catherine, Paul and Brenna expanded the Pavlovsk estate with real military barracks, officers' quarters and a hospital. Paul instructed Brenna to scavenge Catherine's most recent, incomplete buildings for materials; Cameron's Rose Field Pavilion (Russian: беседка на Розовом Поле), New Gallery and Temple of Memory in Sophia park disappeared without a trace, while the Chinese Village in Tsarskoye Selo lost its elaborate exterior finishes.

== Pella ==
Drawing of Pella Palace by Giacomo Quarenghi shows only three of twenty-five buildings of what was Russia's largest imperial palace

In 1784, Catherine ordered the construction of a country residence for her grandson, Alexander. The name, Pella Palace, invoked the memories of Alexander the Great and Pella, the capital of ancient Macedon. The message was clear: Alexander, then seven years old, was the new ruler, although legally Paul remained first in line for succession. Pella, designed by Ivan Starov, was the largest Russian imperial palace of the period, and more complex in composition than anything in Russia. The core palace was encircled with twenty-four smaller buildings in Palladian style connected with double-colonnaded galleries. Catherine called Pella the "rising phoenix", alluding to Alexander's ascension to power after her death.

After Pella, Catherine commissioned two more palaces for Alexander. The first, a diminutive Alexander Dacha near Pavlovsk, was designed by either Nikolay Lvov or Charles Cameron. It was completed in 1789; unusually for Catherinian architecture, it combined a neoclassical ground floor and an Oriental tented belvedere with a gilded dome. The dacha, once described as a "temple of the rosebush with no thorns", was later abandoned, and sold to private owners. The second, Alexander Palace in Tsarskoye Selo, was built in 1792 until 1796 by Giacomo Quarenghi as a wedding gift to Alexander and Elisabeth (Louise of Baden). The palace survived Paul's reign and passed to Alexander's brother, future tsar Nicholas.

Immediately after Catherine's death, Paul ordered Pella to be demolished and materials to be reused for the construction of St. Michael's Castle in St. Petersburg. The demolition, authorized by Paul on December 7, 1796, actually commenced in May 1797, starting with connecting galleries. By January 1801, six of the nine buildings were completely demolished; three others were razed during Alexander's reign. Not only were the buildings demolished, but virtually all images of them also vanished.

== Saint Michael's Castle ==
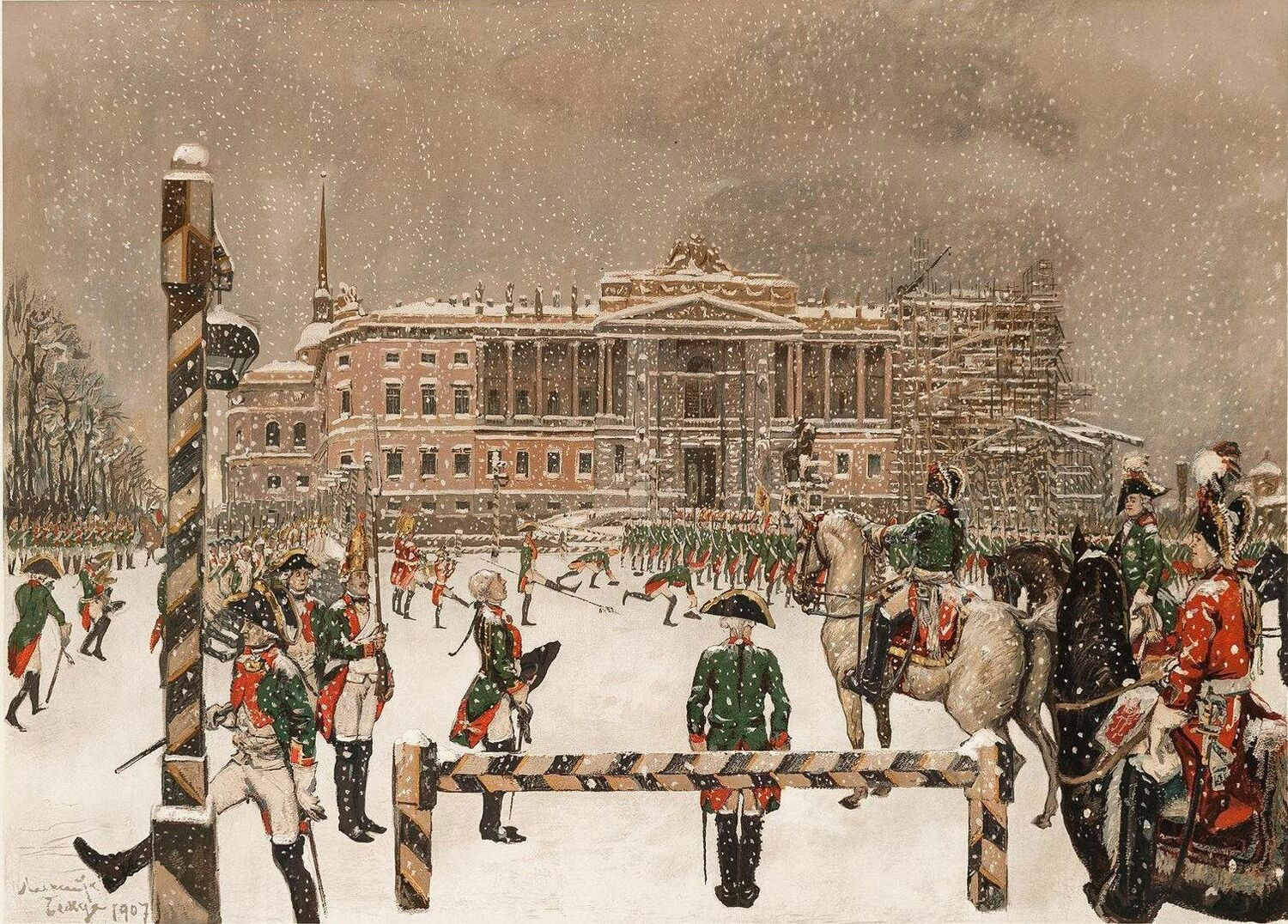
Military Parade of Emperor Paul in front of Saint Michael's Castle by Alexandre Benois. Note scaffolding around the unfinished castle.

Paul's dreams, visualized by Brenna in the 1780s, materialized in Saint Michael's Castle–the emperor's principal Saint Petersburg residence intended to replace the Winter Palace associated with Catherine's reign. The site chosen for the castle was highly significant to Paul: it housed the wooden Summer Palace of Empress Elisabeth, it was Paul's birthplace, but also a place where his dreaded mother was proclaimed empress by the same people who killed his father. Paul said that he had a vision of Archangel Michael who instructed him to erect a church on his birthplace, and indeed the castle designed by Brenna had a prominent church integrated into its western facade. Authorized immediately after Catherine's death, the castle was completed by Brenna in four years and occupied by the royal family shortly before Paul's death. It had a strong Baroque styling, contrary to Catherinian palladianism.

Paul I was killed in Saint Michael's Castle on 23 March [O.S. 11 March] 1801. Brenna, Carlo Rossi and many other Italian artists employed by the late emperor left Russia. Alexander and his court relocated to Winter Palace, and his Office of the Court (Russian: гофинтендантское ведомство) converted the redundant castle into offices and living quarters. Soon, the former palace housed nearly 900 residents, including future Field Marshal von Diebitsch and, ironically, retired Charles Cameron and his wife. In 1819, the building was converted into a military college; palace park, forts and moats eventually disappeared.

== Aftermath ==
During the decade that separated Paul's death in 1801 and the French invasion of Russia in 1812, the Saint Petersburg court and its architects refined and modified Catherinian neoclassicism into the Russian version of the Empire style. Alexander I has not actively engage with architecture until post-war reconstruction, although he preferred the art of Quarenghi, Thomas de Thomon and Andrey Voronikhin; the construction of Voronikhin's Kazan Cathedral was launched just weeks after Paul's death. Outside Saint Petersburg, various Romantic styles based on Neo-Gothic architecture coexisted with prevailing official art. The aging architects involved in the "battle of the palaces" retired, making way for a new generation:

- Carlo Rossi returned to Saint Petersburg, assuming the de facto role of a city architect in 1814. His career in architecture extended into the 1830s.
- Giacomo Quarenghi enjoyed a revival of his career in 1803–1808 when he created the Smolny Institute, the Catherinian Institute, the Imperial Cabinet of Anichkov Palace and other Saint Petersburg landmarks. He was raised to the hereditary nobility in 1814 and died in 1817.
- Ivan Starov, the architect of Pella Palace, retired before Paul's ascension and died in 1808. His last significant work, a cathedral in Kazan, was completed in 1796.
- Vincenzo Brenna settled in Dresden, Saxony, and did not practice architecture ever after; he died in 1820.
- Charles Cameron returned to active service in 1803 as the chief architect of the Russian Admiralty; in two years, he completed the Navy Hospital in Oranienbaum and prepared drafts for the Naval Cathedral in Kronstadt. He retired with honors in 1805 and lived in Saint Michael's Castle until his death in 1812.
- Matvey Kazakov completed scores of private and public neoclassical buildings and a Neo-Gothic cathedral in Moscow. In 1806, he was accused of mismanaging public money; no criminal charges were made, but he was fired from all government contracts. Kazakov died in 1812, shortly after hearing the news that most of his works perished in the Great Moscow Fire of 1812.

== See also ==
- Tsaritsyno Park
- Pavlovsk Palace
- Pella Palace
- Alexander Palace
- Saint Michael's Castle
- Era of Russian palace revolutions (thematically)

== Sources ==
- Brumfield, William Craft (1997). Landmarks of Russian Architecture: A Photographic Survey. Routledge. ISBN 90-5699-537-5.
- Colvin, Howard (2008). A biographical dictionary of British architects, 1600-1840. Yale University Press. ISBN 978-0-300-12508-5.
- Cracraft, James; Rowland, Daniel Bruce (2003). Architectures of Russian Identity: 1500 to the Present. Cornell University Press. ISBN 0-8014-8828-1.
- Cross, Anthony Glenn (1997). By the banks of the Neva: chapters from the lives and careers of the British in eighteenth-century Russia. Cambridge University Press. ISBN 0-521-55293-1.
- Lanceray, Nikolay (2006). Vincenzo Brenna (Винченцо Бренна) (in Russian). Saint Petersburg: Kolo. ISBN 5-901841-34-4.
- Shvidkovsky, Dmitry (2007). Russian architecture and the West. Yale University Press. ISBN 978-0-300-10912-2.
- Streeter, Michael (2007). Catherine the Great. Haus Publishing. ISBN 978-1-905791-06-4.
