= Pella Palace =

Residence of Catherine the Great

Coordinates: 59.7648°N 30.7733°E

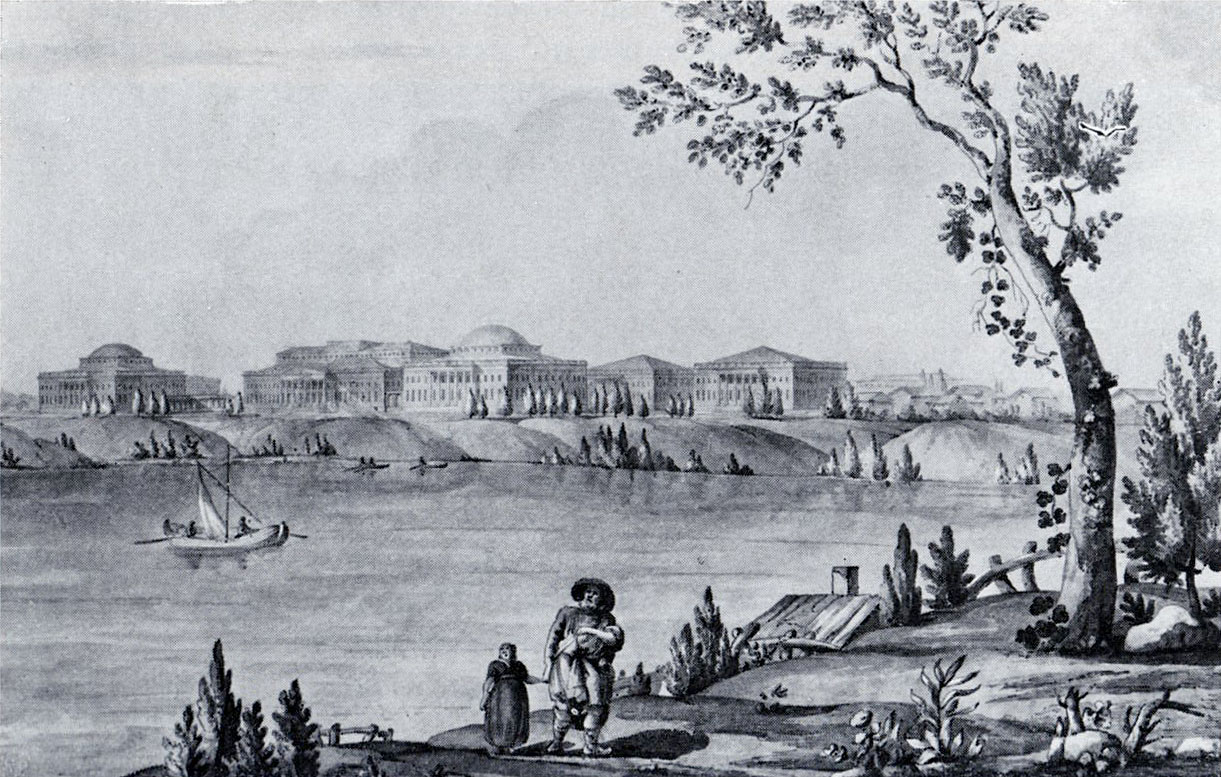
A veduta from c. 1796

Pella Palace (Russian: Пеллинский дворец, romanized: Pellinsky dvorets) was a summer residence built during the reign of Catherine II of Russia for her grandson, future emperor Alexander. It was situated on the left bank of the Neva River, 30 km (19 mi) east of Saint Petersburg, where the town of Otradnoye now stands. If completed, it would have been Russia's largest imperial palace. Pella, partially built in 1785–1789, was razed to the ground by Catherine's son, Paul I of Russia. Not only the buildings disappeared, but very few images of it survived the Battle of the Palaces: existing knowledge of Pella relies on a few facade elevations and watercolors by Giacomo Quarenghi and an elaborate drawing on Catherine's fan, also based on Quarenghi's drafts.

== Beginning ==
Extremely fond of her grandson Alexander, the Empress liked to think of him as the new Alexander the Great. In November 1784 she purchased the estate of Pallila (also called Ivanovskaya Myza) from the heirs of Ivan Neplyuev. Ivanovskaya had already been a well-appointed estate with a two-storey wooden manor, four guest houses and various services. The park contained a pool, connected to the river Neva by a canal, and was modestly adorned with statues and follies. Catherine stayed in the manor occasionally before major construction commenced.

In 1785 Ivanovskaya was renamed to Pella, an allusion to the birthplace of Alexander the Great and the illustrious future envisioned for Alexander. In April 1785 Catherine wrote to Melchior Grimm that she planned to set up an English landscape park around Pella; in fact, earlier, on March 13, 1785, she authorized Ivan Starov's draft for a spacious, proper imperial palace. The Groundbreaking ceremony was celebrated on July 17, 1785 when work was already underway.

== Execution ==
Giacomo Quarenghi's copy of Ivan Starov's design for the palace

Potemkin's favorite architect, Ivan Starov, was instructed to recreate the palace of the ancient rulers of Macedon in the Neoclassical style and to suitably adorn the residence with antique objets d'art. Giacomo Quarenghi provided regular consultancy to Catherine, liaising with Starov; English gardener John Bush was appointed to do the landscaping in 1787.

In order to accomplish the task, Starov obtained copies of Étienne-Louis Boullée's grandiose designs for rebuilding the Versailles Palace. His design for Pella, modeled on Boullée's unexecuted project, pleased the Empress so much that she declared to her European correspondents: "all my summer residences are mere huts if you compare them with Pella, which rises like Phoenix from ashes". Catherine called Pella "rising phoenix", alluding to Alexander's ascension to power after her own death. Pella, designed by Ivan Starov, was the largest Russian imperial palace of the period, and more complex in composition than anything in Russia. According to the design, the core palace was to be encircled with eight auxiliary residences and sixteen smaller service buildings in Palladian style, connected with double-colonnaded galleries.

The Empress invested 823 thousand roubles before the Russo-Turkish War of 1787–1792 broke out and construction works were suspended (on 3 November 1789). By this time, nine core buildings and two of five connecting galleries were completed; the service buildings had not been started. The project consumed 25 million bricks, 1,383 cubic sazhen of granite cladding; palaces have already been equipped with 350 heating ovens and furniture made by David Roentgen.

== Destruction ==
Post station in Pella

The palace shell, with a riverside frontage stretching for 500 metres (1,600 feet), remained in place until December 1796, when Catherine's successor Paul, eager to obliterate the memory of his mother's undertakings, ordered the palace to be demolished and materials to be reused for construction of Saint Michael's Castle in St. Petersburg. Demolition, authorized by Paul on December 7, 1796 actually commenced in May 1797, starting with connecting galleries. By January 1801 six of nine buildings were completely demolished, three others were razed during Alexander's reign.

The surviving post office building that was built by Starov in 1780s, was not part of the palace proper. It was designed to mirror Pella layout in a smaller scale, with curvilinear galleries and service building flanking the main rotunda hall. In the 19th century most of these galleries were demolished; the main hall was deformed by installing new chimneys and new window openings.

== Sources ==
- Shvidkovsky, Dmitry (2007). Russian architecture and the West. Yale University Press. ISBN 978-0-300-10912-2.
- Voronov, Victor (2008). Ivan Starov (Иван Старов) (in Russian). Saint Petersburg: Iskusstvo-SPB. ISBN 9785210015112.

== Online references ==
- (in Russian) Palaces and Manors of the Ladoga Region
