= Charles Cameron (architect) =

Scottish architect (1745–1812)

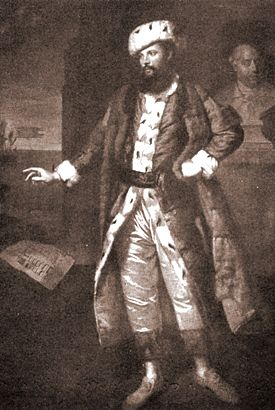
- Oil-painting signed by R. Hunter, Dublin, 1773, previously in the Townshend collection, Raynham Hall
- Born: c. 1745; Scotland
- Died: 19 March 1812 (aged 66–67); Saint Petersburg, Russia
- Occupation: Architect
- Buildings: Main palace in Pavlovsk; Cameron's Gallery and Cold Baths in Tsarskoye Selo
- Projects: Parks of Pavlovsk, Sophia and Tsarskoye Selo

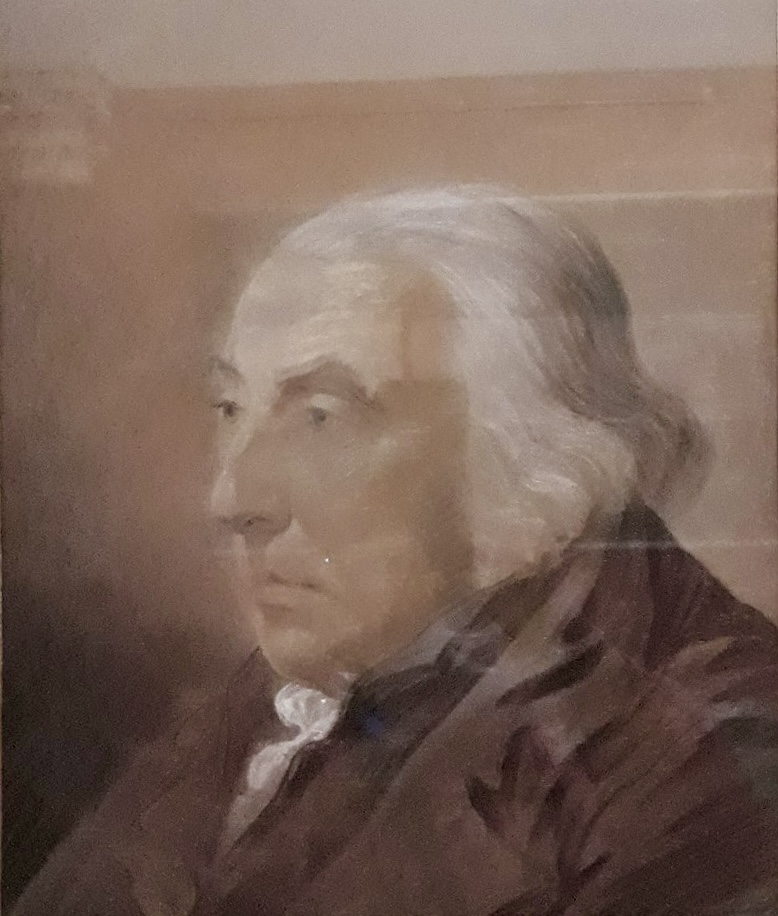
Aminov Portrait, c. 1809

Charles Cameron (c. 1745 – 19 March 1812) was a Scottish architect who made an illustrious career at the court of Catherine II of Russia.

Cameron, a practitioner of early neoclassical architecture, was the chief architect of Tsarskoye Selo and Pavlovsk palaces and the adjacent new town of Sophia from his arrival in Russia in 1779 to Catherine's death in 1796. Cameron concentrated exclusively on country palaces and landscape gardens. Twice dismissed by Paul of Russia during the Battle of the Palaces, Cameron enjoyed a brief revival of his career under Alexander I in 1803–1805. All his indisputable tangible works "can be encompassed in a day's tour".

Cameron's British neoclassicism was an isolated episode in Russian architecture, then dominated by Italian artists (Francesco Rastrelli, Antonio Rinaldi, Giacomo Quarenghi, Vincenzo Brenna, Carlo Rossi, and many others). According to his first biographer Georgy Lukomsky, "Cameron remains one of the greatest exponents of British taste and British Art abroad, and if he has been so completely forgotten in his own country, it would seem only right to rectify this omission".

Howard Colvin ranked Cameron "one of the major urban architects of the eighteenth century ... an accomplished designer and decorator in a neoclassical style that has affinities with that of Robert Adam. His style is sufficiently individual to exonerate him from the imputation of being merely an imitator... Although still a Palladian, Cameron was a pioneer of Greek Revival in Russia." Apart from the well-researched Catherinian period (1779–1796), Cameron's life story remains poorly documented, not in the least due to Cameron's own efforts to shake off the bad reputation he had earned in the 1770s in London

== Early life ==
Details of Cameron’s origins are uncertain. He was probably the son of Walter Cameron, a London carpenter. However, he claimed descent from the Camerons of Lochiel, a Scottish clan deeply involved in the Jacobite rising of 1745.

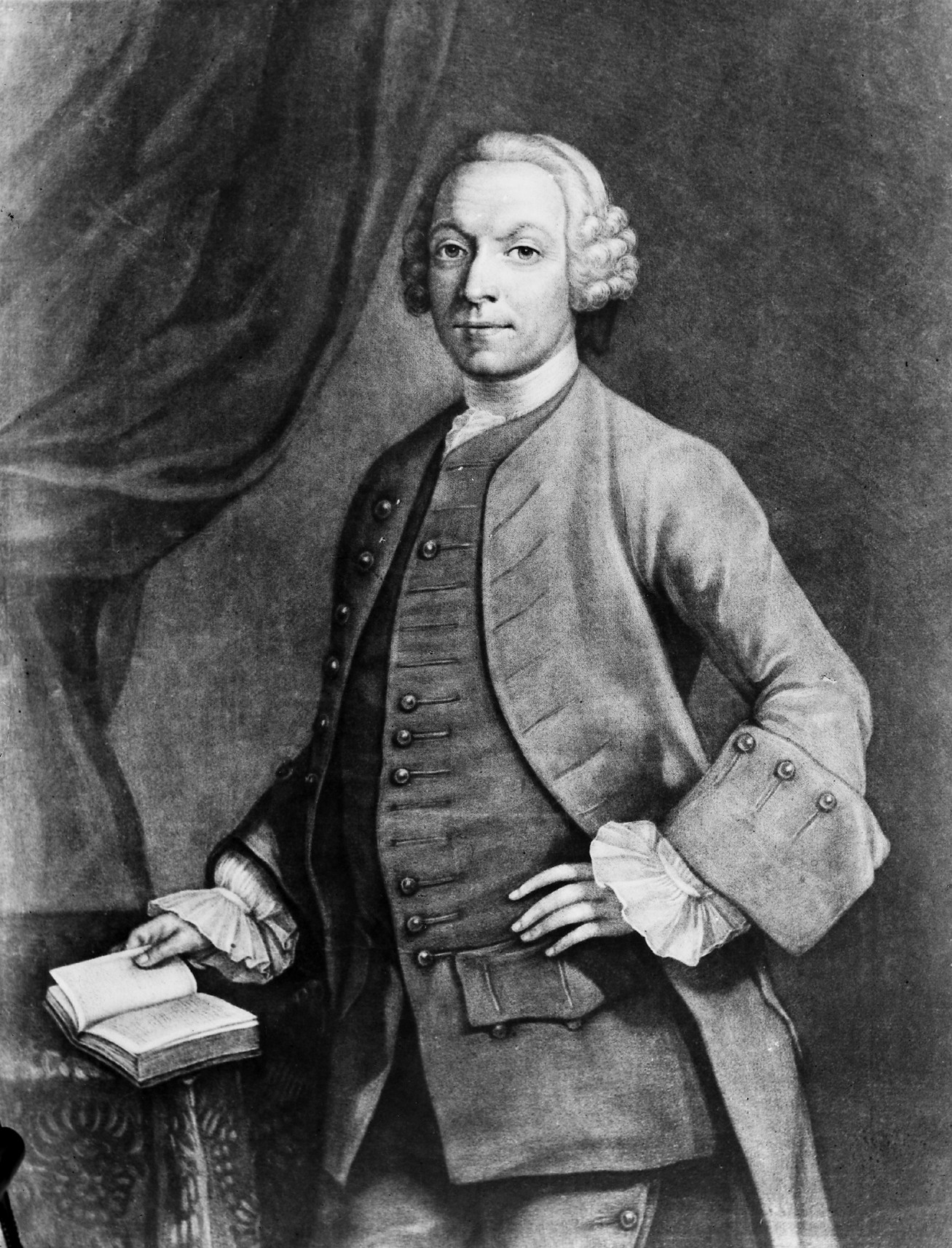
Dr Archibald Cameron of Lochiel (1707–1753)

Walter Cameron was certainly friendly with Dr Archibald Cameron, the last Jacobite to be executed and a brother of the chief Donald Cameron of Lochiel. Walter visited Archibald shortly before his execution and may have assisted his wife and children, one of whom was named Charles. Talbot Rice claimed that Charles Cameron was in fact this son of Dr. Archibald. Cameron used the Lochiel coat of arms for his personal bookplate, although modern researchers since David Talbot Rice question his claim of Lochiel lineage. Researchers also disagree on the exact year of Cameron's birth, which may be either 1743, 1745 or 1746.

== Early career ==
Cameron trained in London with his father and with the architect Isaac Ware. After Ware's death in 1766 Cameron settled on continuing his late master's work on a new edition of Lord Burlington's Fabbriche Antiche, a project that required personal studies and surveys of ancient Roman architecture. He spent 1767 in London, preparing prints of works by Andrea Palladio, and arrived in Rome in 1768. There, he surveyed the Baths of Titus and Nero's Domus Aurea, digging into subterranean remains that were rediscovered only in the 20th century. According to Dmitry Shvidkovsky, Cameron met in Rome with another Charles Cameron, a Jacobite and a true member of the Lochiel clan, (likely Dr Archibald's son) and "borrowed" the life story of the latter to embellish his own. Cameron returned from Italy around 1769 and published the results of his studies in 1772 (reissues 1774, 1775) under the title The Baths of the Romans explained and illustrated... with proper scientific commentaries in English and French.

Cameron's life between 1769 and his departure to Russia in 1779 remains barely known. Archives attest to his involvement in only one construction contract in London, for an Adam style building in Hanover Square (1770–1775). Walter Cameron, the main contractor, was ruined by litigation with the property owner and had to sell his son's art collection to raise funds. Charles sued his father, who was jailed in Fleet Prison for debt. In 1791, when Cameron applied for a membership in the Architect's Club of London, he was barred admission due to this and other episodes that had stained his reputation in England.

== Arrival in Russia ==
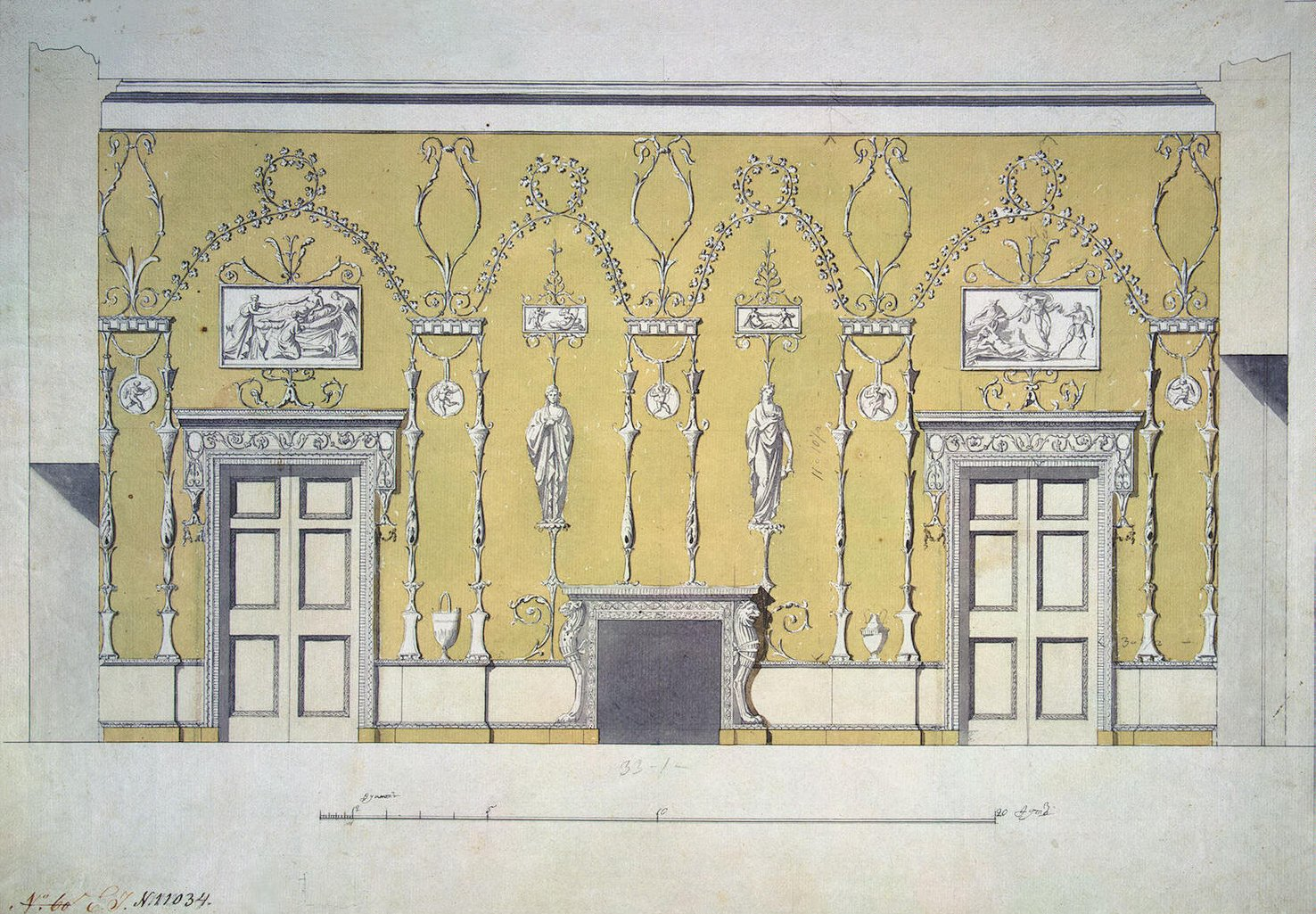
Cameron's draft for the dining room in Catherine Palace

Empress Catherine's tastes in architecture evolved from Rococo and Gothic Revival architecture in the first decade of her reign to emerging Neoclassicism in the 1780s. She leaned to French variety of neoclassicism (Clerisseau, Ledoux) mixed with ancient Roman motifs. Catherine, perhaps the first of European monarchs, realized that the emerging style had the potential to become a definitive form of imperial art. She spared no expense in hiring foreign architects and craftsmen trained in the neoclassical manner. She instructed Baron Melchior Grimm, her European agent in matters of art and antiques, to hire Italian architects because "the Frenchmen we have here know too much and build dreadful houses – because they know too much." These Italians, Giacomo Quarenghi and the relatively unknown Giacomo Trombara, arrived in Russia after Cameron.

Cameron arrived in Russia in 1779, also invited by Catherine's agents. Exact details of Cameron's hire remain vague, but on 23 August 1779 an enthusiastic Catherine wrote to Grimm that "At present I am very taken with Mr. Cameron, a Scot by nationality and a Jacobite, great draughtsman, well versed in antique monuments and well known for his book on the Baths of Rome. At the moment we are making a garden with him on a terrace..." Catherine also wrote that Cameron was raised at the Roman court of James Francis Edward Stuart ("James III and VIII") and that he was a nephew of Jean Cameron of Glendessary. Cameron settled first in Chernyshev House in Saint Petersburg but soon moved to his own house in Tsarskoye Selo; it was later taken from him by emperor Paul.

Cameron, a Londoner, had no practical experience in landscaping prior to 1779. Peter Hayden suggested that Cameron learned the trade from his father-in-law, John Busch (anglicised Bush), who worked in Tsarskoye Selo since 1771.

== Tsarskoye Selo ==
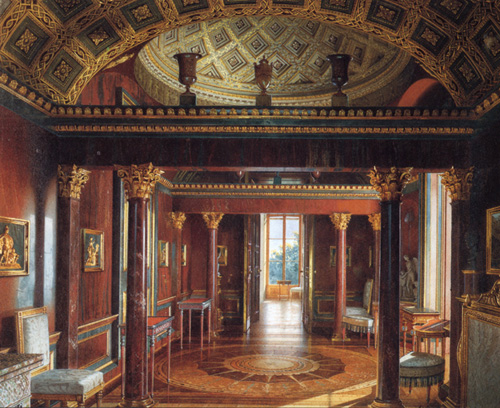
The Agate Pavilion. "At Tsarskoye Selo Cameron produced some of the most exquisitely elegant neoclassical interiors in eighteenth-century Europe" – Howard Colvin

Cameron's career in Russia started with expansion of the Chinese Village in Tsarskoye Selo park, borrowing design ideas from William Chambers. The theatre of Chinese Village had already been in place, designed by Antonio Rinaldi and Ivan Neelov; Cameron's undisputed additions are the living quarters of the Village and the Chinese Bridges over the canal. During Paul's reign Cameron's buildings were stripped of exterior finishes and later rebuilt by Vasily Stasov in 1817.

In 1780–1784 he redecorated the formerly Rococo halls of the main Catherine Palace built by Bartolomeo Rastrelli in the 1750s; what started as a modest remodelling soon resulted in the most lavish interiors of the whole palace, reminiscent of Palladio, Raphael, Robert Adam and Clerisseau yet blending into Cameron's unmistakingly own style. As early as 22 June 1771 Catherine praised the architect: "There are not yet but two rooms to do and there one rushes, because just here one sees nothing to equal it. I confess that I myself will not tire during nine weeks of watching this."

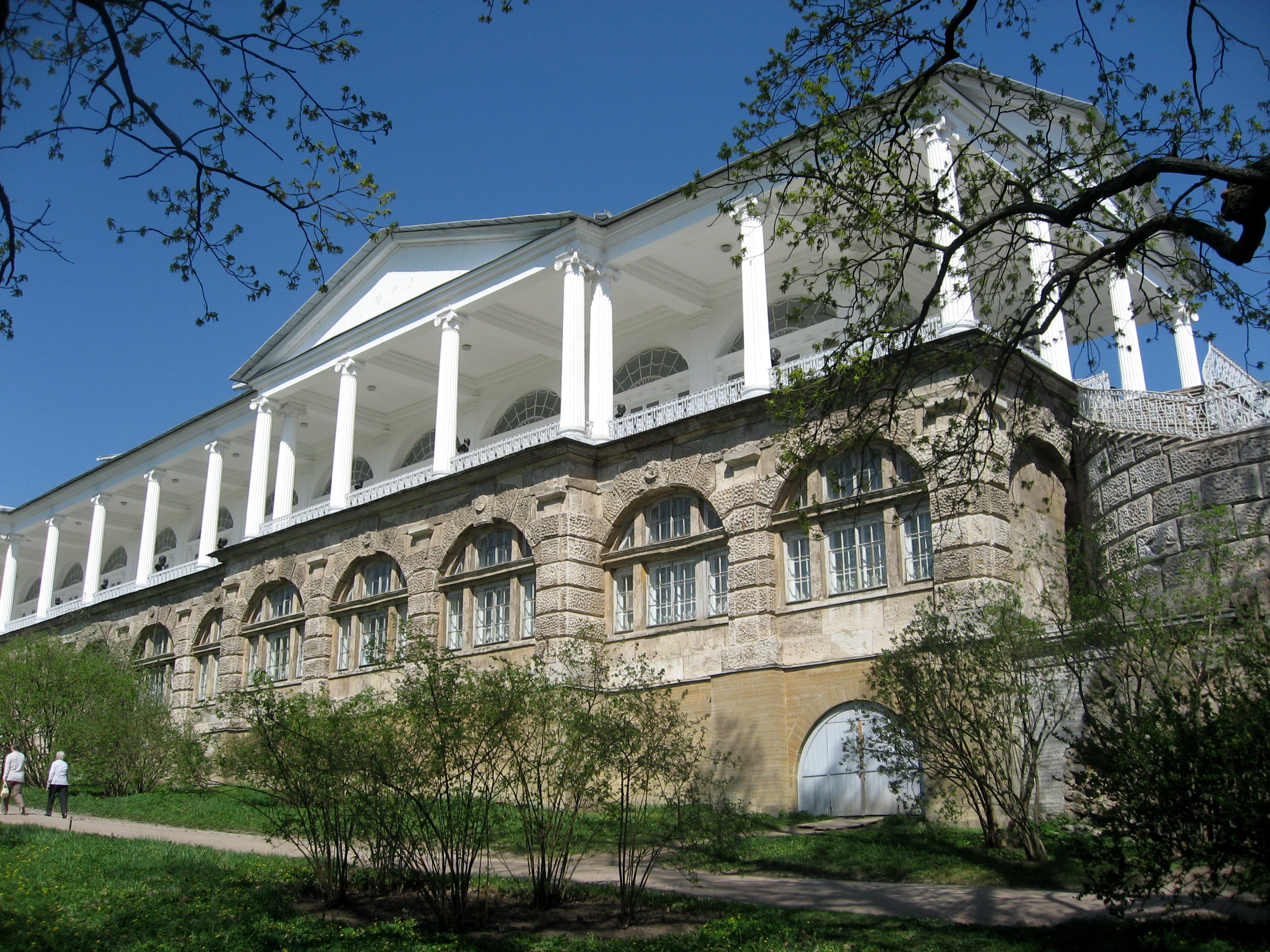
Cameron's Gallery

Catherine had another specific task for Cameron: she envisaged a new, relatively modest Neoclassical building in Tsarskoye Selo near the older Rococo Catherine Palace. Clerisseau, Catherine's first choice, produced drafts for a gigantic and expensive Roman structure based on the Baths of Diocletian, that were rejected out of hand but later influenced Quarenghi and Cameron. In 1782 Cameron started his first standalone building, the Cold Baths, a two-story bathhouse in mixed Italian-Greek classicism with luxurious interiors (notably the Agate Pavilion). In 1784–1787 it was expanded with a two-story gallery (Cameron's Gallery), mixing natural stone Roman ground floor with a lightweight, snow-white upper floor gallery marked with unusually wide spacing between columns. The gallery, adorned with statues of foreign poets and philosophers, became Catherine's favourite promenade for years. It was flanked with a formal garden on one side and an English landscape park on the other.

In the beginning of the Gallery project Cameron himself acted as Catherine's recruiter, hiring fellow Scotsmen to work in Tsarskoye Selo. 73 craftsmen, including William Heste and Adam Menelaws, agreed to move to Russia (many took their families with them), causing a futile protest of the Foreign Office. The number was too high for Cameron, and the Scots eventually dispersed to other projects; Menelaws became assistant to Nikolay Lvov.

== Sophia ==
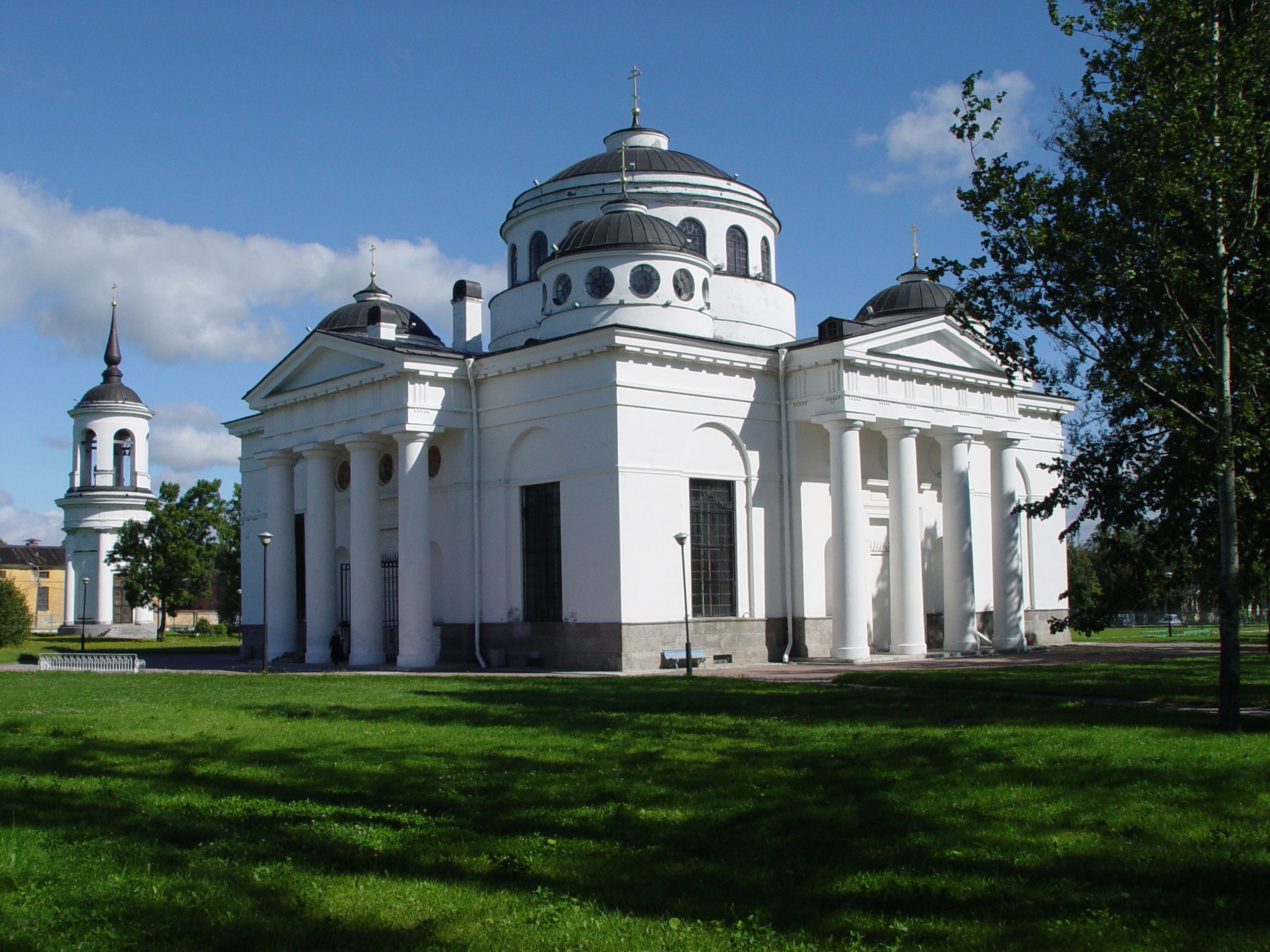
Sophia Ascencion cathedral near Tsarskoye Selo was built as an allegory of Hagia Sophia. It is attributed jointly to Cameron and Ivan Starov.

Sophia, a model town, was built near Tsarskoye Selo to Cameron's plan. It was designed to be viewed from the walkways of Cameron's Gallery and represent Constantinople, the coveted target of Catherine's Greek project; the name of the town and its cathedral clearly alluded to Hagia Sophia. Catherine decreed that the streets of Sofia must blend with the roads of Tsarskoye Selo park. Cameron arranged the streets to make an impression that they all radiate from the Gallery. The streets were brightly lit at night when Catherine was present at Tsarskoye.

More historical allegories were scattered in the park: the lake with Rinaldi's rostral column represented the Black Sea; Doric ruins symbolized the former might of Ancient Greece. These follies, scattered along the road to Catherine Palace, doubled as the setting for triumphant procession for visiting dignitaries.

Peter Hayden drew parallels between Cameron's landscaping in Sophia with that of Stowe House park, notably the similarity between Cameron's Temple of Memory and the Temple of Concord and Victory built at Stowe by an unknown architect in the 1740s. Another direct quote from Stowe is the Pyramid Tomb over the grave of Catherine's three Italian Greyhounds; it survived to date but the Temple of Memory was razed by Paul of Russia in 1797.

== Pavlovsk ==
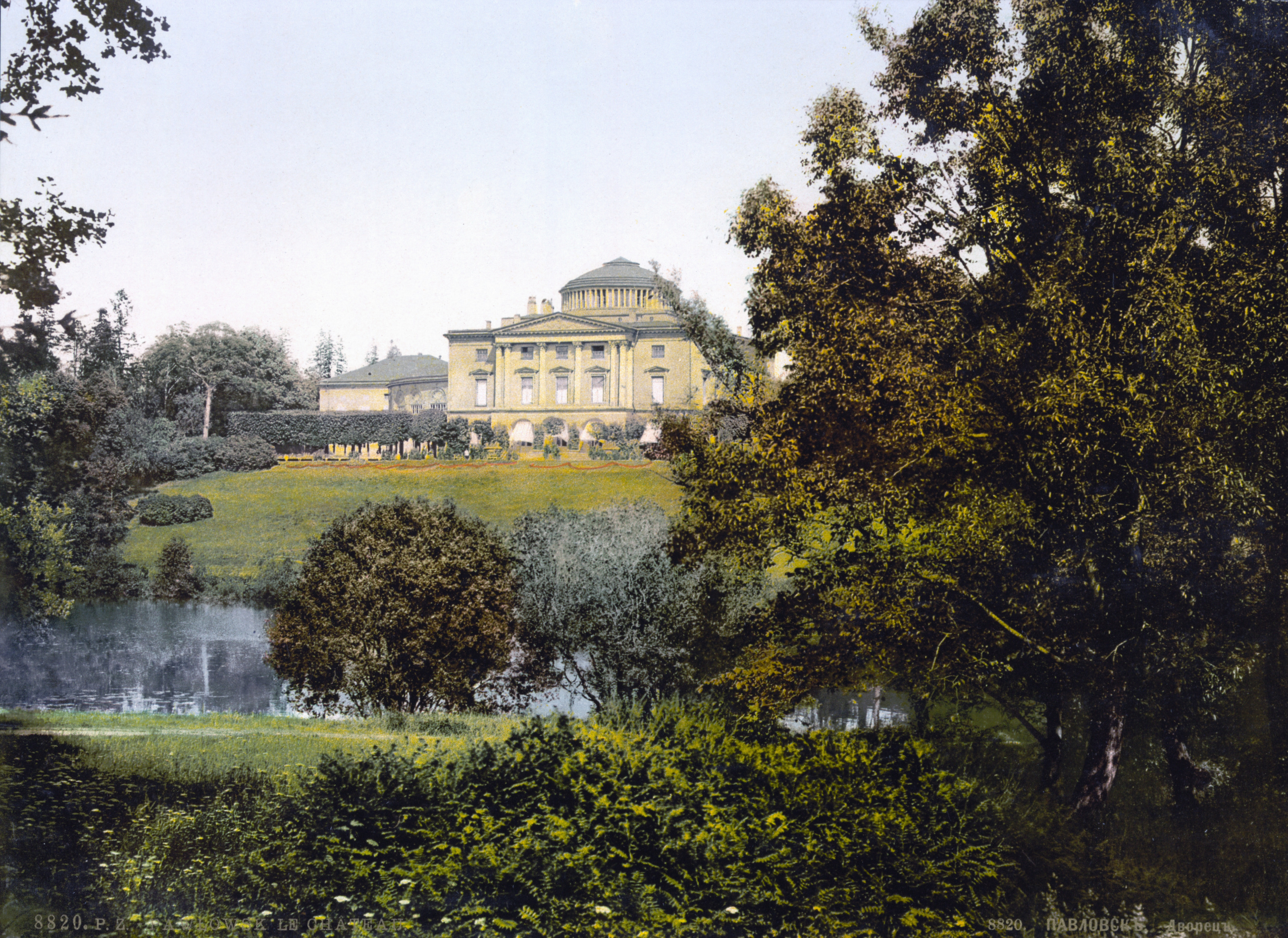
Pavlovsk Palace, end of 19th century

Pavlovsk, the largest landscape park in 18th century Russia (1,500 acres), is attributed to a succession of architects, starting with Cameron and ending with Carlo Rossi. Cameron built the original palace core that survives to date, the Temple of Friendship, Private Gardens, Aviary, Apollo Colonnade and the Lime Avenue and planned the original landscape, but true authorship of Pavlovsk as a whole should be credited to empress Maria Feodorovna.

The Temple of Friendship was the first building in Pavlovsk, followed by the main palace. Cameron's Pavlovsk was far from Paul's vision of what an imperial residence should be: it lacked moats, forts and all other military paraphernalia so dear to Paul; "Cameron created a markedly private world for the Grand Duke. The palace could have belonged to anyone... not to the tsar of Russia in waiting."

Conflicts between Cameron and Paul and Maria date back to the couple's Grand Tour of Europe (1781–1782). Maria complained about Cameron's delays since 1782. Constrained financially, Paul and Maria closely watched Cameron's progress and regularly curbed his far-reaching, expensive plans. Cameron also displayed signs of aversion to their management since 1782, but court intermediaries downplayed the conflict for a while. By 1785 it became public: Cameron quarreled with Paul over costs of Pavlovsk and Paul himself detested Cameron as Catherine's agent. Between 1786 and 1789 Cameron's duties in Pavlovsk passed to an Italian, Vincenzo Brenna, hired by Paul in 1782. Dismissed by Paul, Cameron continued working on Catherine's own projects until her death in 1796.

== Retirement ==
Upon ascension to power in 1796, Paul fired Cameron from all his contracts and deprived him of his house in Tsarskoye. Cameron experienced financial difficulties and had to sell his collection of books to Pavel Argunov. His activities during Paul's reign are largely unknown. Georgy Lukomsky wrote than in 1799 Cameron redesigned the Baturyn Palace of count Kirill Razumovsky; according to contemporary researchers, Baturyn was a collaborative effort led by Nikolay Lvov and Cameron's involvement cannot be reliably measured.

Lukomsky also wrote that in 1800–1801 Cameron temporarily left Russia for England; according to Colvin, this opinion is unsubstantiated: in 1800–1801 Cameron worked in Pavlovsk, then owned by Maria Fyodorovna, where he built the Ionic Pavilion of Three Graces.

Alexander, who succeeded Paul in March 1801, appointed Cameron the chief architect of the Russian Admiralty During this brief (1802–1805) employment Cameron designed the Naval Hospital in Oranienbaum and two unrealized drafts for the Naval Cathedral in Kronstadt. He also worked in Pavlovsk, restoring the palace after a fire. In 1805 Cameron finally retired; his tenure at the Admiralty passed to Andreyan Zakharov. Lukomsky noted that Cameron, who once executed Catherine's soaring dreams, was hardly interested in building barracks and repairing gateways.

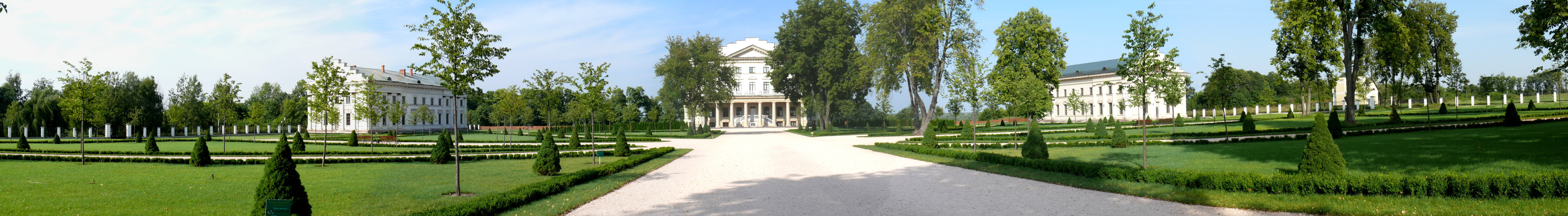
The palace and park ensemble Hetman Kirill Razumovsky in Baturyn (Ukraine, 2011)

== Private life ==
Cameron's personality remains a "shadowy figure": being "proud, aloof and difficult", he had a talent for alienating people. He did not participate in the social life of the English diaspora in Saint Petersburg; he had few Russian friends, did not speak Russian and was disliked for his attitude of "English superiority".

In 1784 Cameron married Catherine Busch, daughter of the imperial gardener John Busch. They had a daughter, Mary, however, her birth has not been evidenced by church records. Mary Cameron, engaged to James Grange, left Russia in 1798. Grange returned to Russia in 1803, and, according to Anthony Cross, could have helped Cameron's career revival in 1803–1805. By 1839 the Granges had seven surviving children.

During retirement Cameron and his wife lived in Paul's favourite palace, Saint Michael's Castle. The redundant and still incomplete castle was converted to living quarters and housed up to 900 residents, including the Camerons and future field marshal Diebitsh. Cameron died in 1812, before Napoleon's invasion of Russia; his widow secured a pension from the Russian Government, sold Cameron's library and either returned to England or died in Saint Petersburg.

== Sources ==
=== Biographies of Cameron ===
The first comprehensive English biography of Cameron was written by Georgy Lukomsky, veteran of Russian neoclassical revival school, and published in 1943 in England with introduction by David Talbot Rice. Nikolay Lanceray had compiled substantial material on Cameron earlier, in the 1920s. It was lost after his arrest, apart from the fragments used in his book on Vincenzo Brenna, first printed in 2006. In the last quarter of the 20th century Anthony Glenn Cross researched Cameron's life as part of the British diaspora in Saint Petersburg and tracked his family connections; John Martin Robinson contributed studies of Cameron's early career in England. A definitive modern biography of Cameron, The Empress and the Architect, was published by Dmitry Shvidkovsky in English in 1996 (most recent Russian edition: 2008). Cameron's concise biography in the fourth edition of Howard Colvin's Biographical Dictionary of British Architects cites all the English sources listed above.

- Howard Montagu Colvin (2008). A Biographical Dictionary of British Architects, 1600-1840: Fourth Edition. Paul Mellon Ctr for Studies. pp. 211–213. ISBN 978-0-300-12508-5.
- Anthony Cross (13 November 1996). 'By the Banks of the Neva': Chapters from the Lives and Careers of the British in Eighteenth-Century Russia. Cambridge University Press. ISBN 978-0-521-55293-6.
- Lukomsky, Georges (1943). Charles Cameron, Architect. An illustrated monograph. Alexander Palace Foundation. Also includes:
  - Atchison, Bob (2005). "New foreword to Charles Cameron by Georgy Lukomsky". Archived from the original on 21 December 2008.
  - Rice, D. T. (1943). "Introduction to Charles Cameron by Georgy Lukomsky".
- Shvidkovsky, Dimitri (1996). The Empress & the Architect: British Architecture and Gardens at the Court of Catherine the Great. Yale University Press. ISBN 978-0-300-06564-0.
- Dimitrij Olegovič Švidkovskij (2008). Charles Cameron i arhitektura imperatorskikh rezidentsii (Чарлз Камерон и архитектура императорских резиденций) (in Russian). Moscow:Uley. ISBN 978-5-91529-003-6.

=== Biographies of contemporary artists ===
- Kuznetsov, S. O. (1998). "Adam Menelas na rossiyskoy zemle (Адам Менелас на российской земле. Возможные пути интерпретации творчества архитектора императора Николая I)" (PDF) (in Russian). The Philosophical Age. Almanac 6. Russia at the Time of Nicholas I: Science, Politics, Enlightenment. Ed. by T. Khartanovich, M. Mikeshin. St. Petersburg, 1998. Archived from the original (PDF) on 18 December 2022.
- Lanceray, Nikolay (2006). Vincenzo Brenna (Винченцо Бренна) (in Russian). Saint Petersburg: Kolo. ISBN 5-901841-34-4. Also includes:
  - Vityazeva, V. A., Modzalevskaya, M. A. (2006, in Russian) Istorik russkoy arhitektury Nikolay Lanceray (Историк русской культуры Николай Лансере)

=== Books on Russian architecture ===
- William Craft Brumfield (1997). Landmarks of Russian Architecture: A Photographic Survey. Psychology Press. ISBN 978-90-5699-537-9.
- James Cracraft; Daniel Daniel Bruce Rowland (2003). Architectures of Russian Identity: 1500 To the Present. ISBN 978-0-8014-8828-3.
- Peter Hayden (2005). Russian Parks And Gardens. Frances Lincoln Ltd. ISBN 978-0-7112-2430-8.
- Dmitriĭ Olegovich Shvidkovskiĭ (2007). Russian Architecture and the West. ISBN 978-0-300-10912-2.
