= Greek Project =

Geopolitical proposal

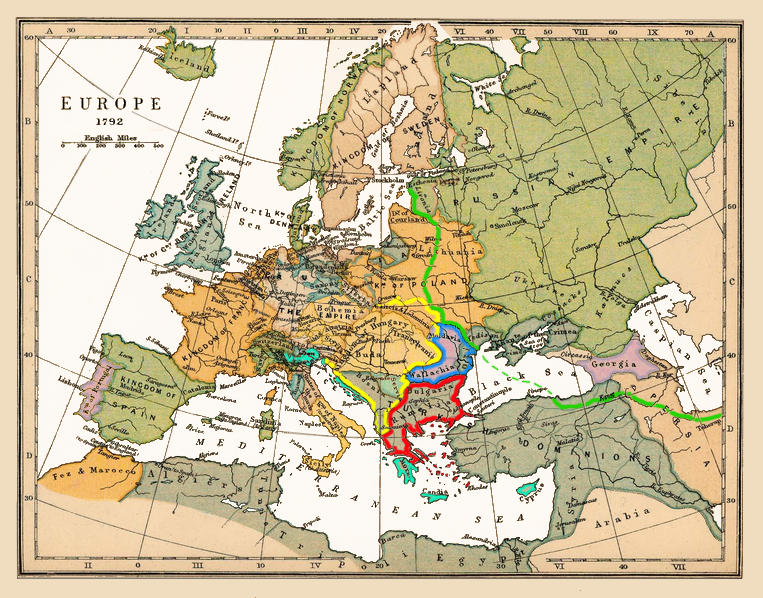
A 20th-century reconstruction of the proposed Greek Project of Catherine the Great: in red, the "Neo-Byzantine Empire" for her grandson Konstantin, in blue the "Kingdom of Dacia" for Grigory Potemkin, in yellow the compensations for the Habsburg Empire and in blue-green those for Venice.

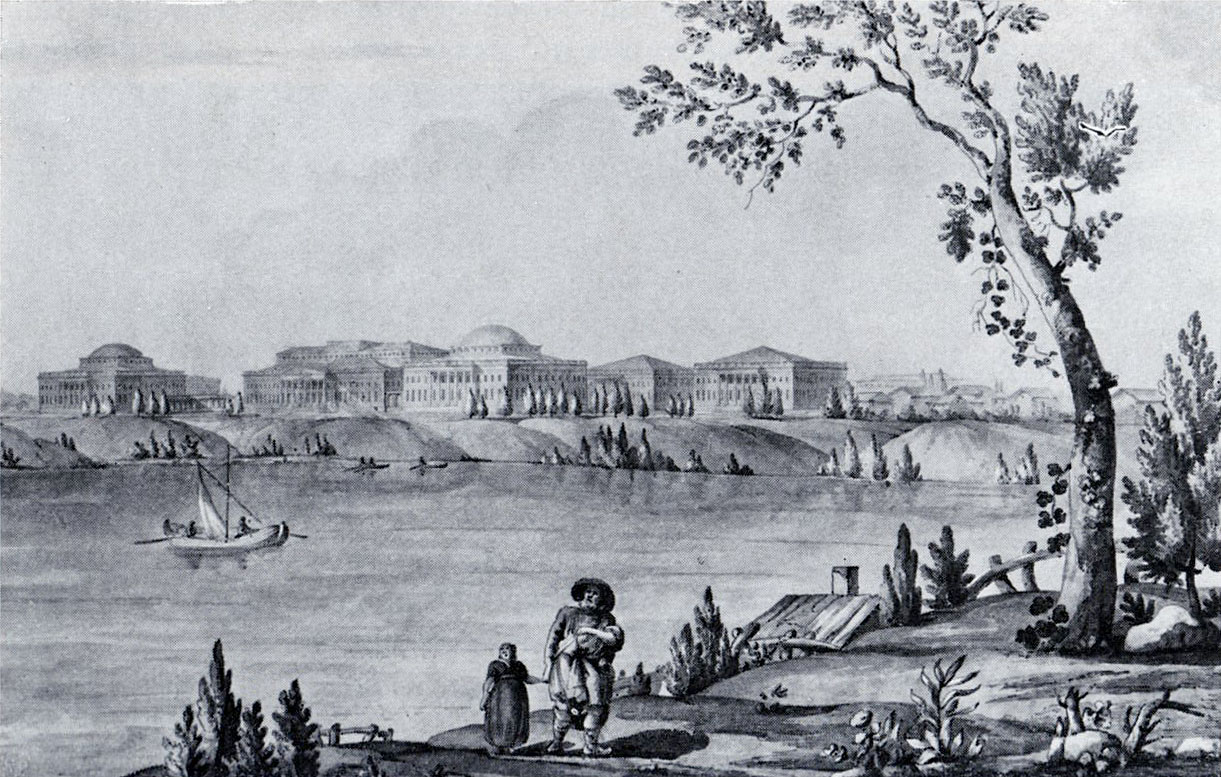
The colossal Pella Palace on the bank of the Neva River, constructed from 1785 onwards. The name "Pella" referenced the birthplace of Alexander the Great.

The Greek Project (Russian: Греческий проект, romanized: Grečeskij projekt), also known as the Greek Plan (Греческий план, Grečeskij plan), was an early proposed solution to the Eastern question advanced by the Russian empress Catherine the Great in the early 1780s. It envisaged the partition of the Ottoman Empire between the Russian and Habsburg Empires followed by the restoration of the Byzantine Empire centered in Constantinople.

== Outline ==
Like her predecessors, Catherine concerned herself with the Orthodox Christians under Ottoman rule; she sponsored the Orlov Revolt in the Morea during the Russo-Turkish War of 1768–1774, and invited many Greeks like Ioannis Varvakis to settle in Russia, mainly in Crimea and New Russia. She conceived that one of her grandsons, born in 1779 and appropriately named Constantine, would become the first emperor of the restored Byzantium. Another important consideration was Russia's goal of free access (especially for the Imperial Russian Navy's Black Sea Fleet, founded in 1783) to the Mediterranean Sea through the Bosphorus, which the Ottomans controlled.

For this plan to succeed, the Great European Powers would need to agree to it and the Danube powers would need to cooperate. In May 1780, Catherine arranged a secret meeting with Joseph II, the Holy Roman Emperor, in Mogilev. In a series of letters from September 1781, Catherine and Joseph discussed their plans to partition the Ottoman Empire and restore the Byzantine Empire. The Austro-Russian alliance was formalized in May 1781.

Prince Grigory Potemkin (1739–1791) masterminded the Greek Project; he gave symbolic Greek-style names to newly founded and newly conquered towns in New Russia (e.g., Odessa and Kherson). Byzantine symbolism was highlighted in new churches such as Kherson Cathedral. Another meeting of the Russian and Austrian monarchs was arranged as part of Catherine's Crimean journey of 1787. Both Russia and Austria declared war on the Ottoman Empire later that year. Joseph's death in 1790, followed by the Treaty of Jassy (January 1792 [O.S. December 1791]) and the Treaty of Sistova (August 1791), in which Austria gained little, effectively ended the agreement. Austrian and European interests also had moved westward with the beginning of the French Revolution of 1789; the French situation would occupy European affairs and alliances until the eventual fall of Napoleon in 1815. The new Concert of Europe thereafter was more concerned with maintaining the territorial integrity of the states that occupied the Balkan peninsula.

== Cities named after Greek names during this period ==
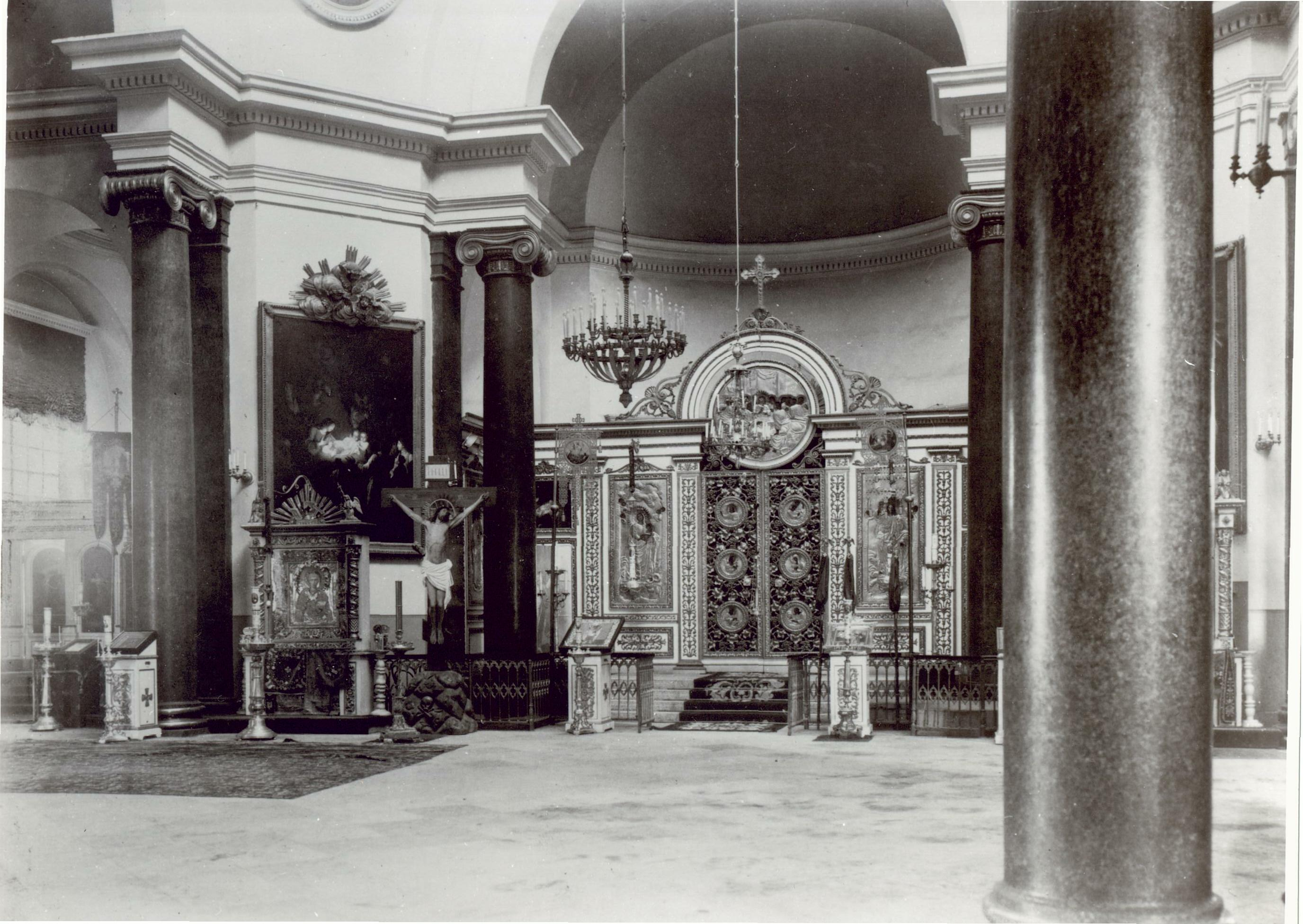
The Sophia Cathedral in Tsarskoe Selo was designed as a small-scale replica of Hagia Sophia in Constantinople

The following major cities were given Greek inspired names during this period. Some of them were new settlements, others were renamed.

| Original settlement | New name | "Greek Project" date | Notes |
|---|---|---|---|
| Bilhowice / Bilchowicze | Kherson | 1778 | after Chersonesus |
| Kezlev / Kerkinitis | Yevpatoria | 1784 | from Eupator: Ευ·πατωρ "(of) noble father", after Mithridates VI of Pontus, whose dominions included Crimea |
| Kalmiuska Sloboda / Domakha | Mariupol | 1780 | after Maria Feodorovna |
| Kyzyiar | Melitopol | 1842 | after Melita (ancient port city) which existed in the vicinity |
| Mykytyn Rih | Nikopol | 1786 | after Nike, the goddess of victory |
| Hacıdere | Ovidiopol | 1793 | after Ovidius |
| Aqyar | Sevastopol | 1784 | Sebaste (Augustus) after the Pontic port of Sebastopolis |
| Aqmescit | Simferopol | 1784 | city of common good |
| Orlyk | Olviopol (Pervomaisk) | 1782 | after Ancient Greek colony Olbia (Pontic Olbia) |
| Khadjibey | Odessa | 1795 | after Odessos (today Varna) thought to be located in the vicinity |
| Staryi Krym | Levkopol | N/A | Leukopolis, "White City" |
| Sucleia (original place) | Tiraspol | 1792 | after Tyras, the Ancient name for the Dniester river |
| N/A | Stavropol | 1777 | stauros (cross) |

== See also ==
- Greek War of Independence
- Megali Idea
- Souliote War (1789–1793)

== Sources ==
- Catherine's Russia: Catherine the Great's "Greek Project"
- Foundation of the Hellenic World: The Greek plan of Catherine II
