= Dmitry Shvidkovsky =

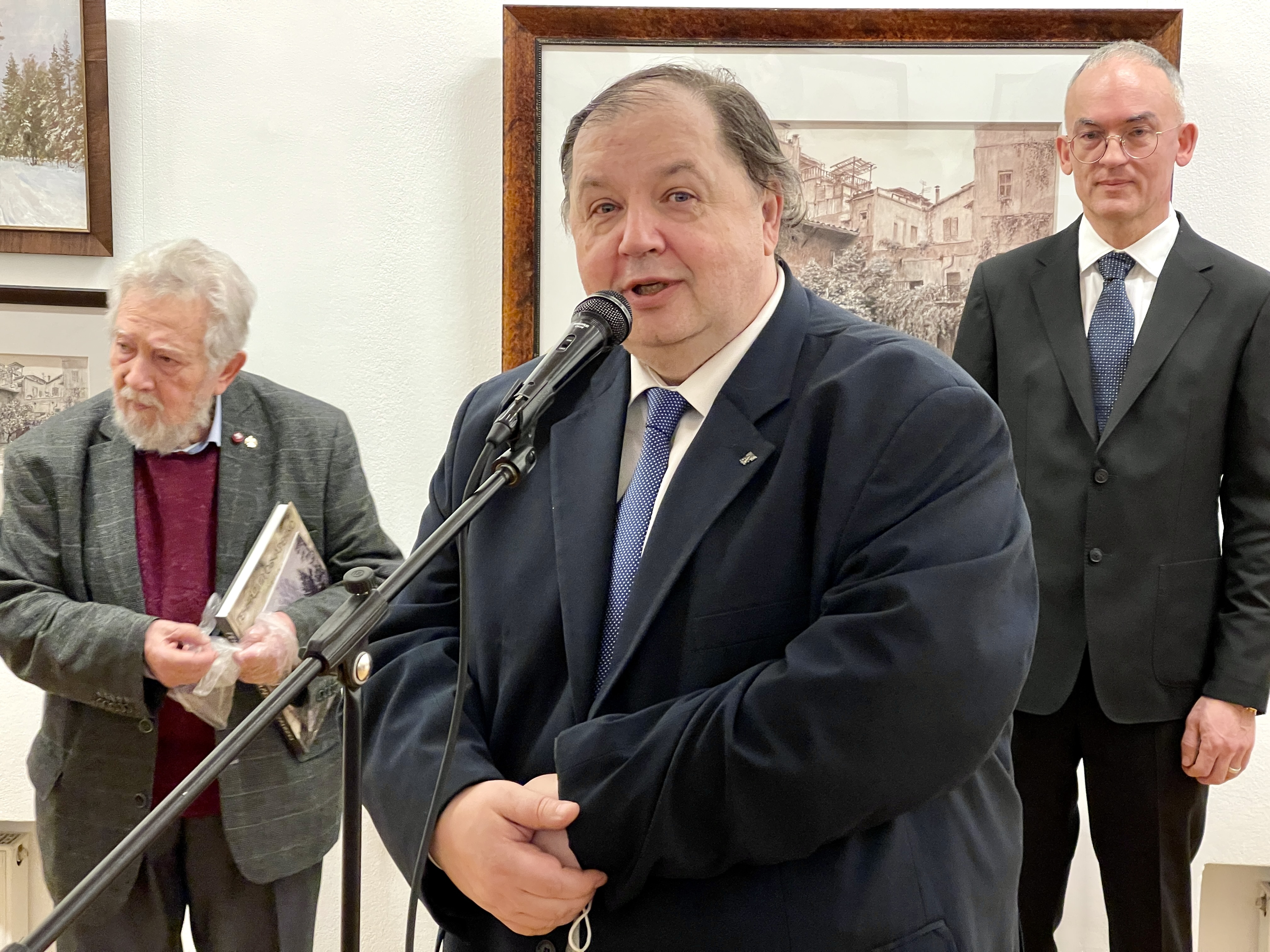
Dmitry Shvidkovsky, 2021

Dmitry Shvidkovsky (Russian: Дмитрий Олегович Швидковский, born 14 May 1959) is a Russian educator and historian of architecture of Russia and the United Kingdom during the Age of Enlightenment. A 1982 alumnus and long-term professor of Moscow Architectural Institute, Shvidkovsky was appointed its rector in 2007.

== Biography ==
Dmitry Shvidkovsky was born in Moscow. He is the son of historian Oleg Shvidkovsky, author of General History of Arts and Building in the U.S.S.R., 1917-1932; his mother hails from the Mamontov dynasty.

Shvidkovsky is the author of the definitive biography of Charles Cameron and a series of essays on contemporary British artists (William Hastie, Adam Menelaws) in Russia and their role in Russian art. In 1997 Shvidkovsky was awarded the medal of the Russian Academy of Arts for his 1996 books St. Petersburg: Architecture of the Tsars and The empress & the architect: British architecture and gardens at the court of Catherine the Great, both printed overseas. The topic of Western influence continued with the 2007 edition of Russian architecture and the West, illustrated by Yekaterina Shorban (Shvidkovsky's wife). Adam Wilkinson of the Architects' Journal summarized: "his thesis [is] that Russian architecture is the product of waves of European influence filtered through Russian conditions - a brave move, given Russia's proud architectural historical tradition... The result is a thrilling architectural grand tour, not dry scholarship".

Shvidkovsky is a full member of the Russian Academy of Arts and its secretary for History of Arts since 1998, and vice-president since 2004. Shvidkovsky is also a full member of the Russian Academy of Architecture and Construction and a corresponding fellow of the British Academy.

Asked in 2009 about the role of independent preservation groups, Shvidkovsky said "I frequently admire what they do, but this is not enough. We must raise a new type of architects who would fight to preserve historic environment... [this is why] this year we make historic preservation courses mandatory for all architecture students, not only restorators." (Russian: .. Я часто восхищаюсь тем, что они делают, но этого недостаточно. Важно еще и воспитать другой тип архитектора, который будет уже по своей моральной позиции борцом за сохранение исторической среды... в этом году мы вводим в образовательную программу курсы по охране наследия как обязательные для всех архитекторов, а не только реставраторов.).
