= Ivan Starov =

Russian architect (1745–1808)

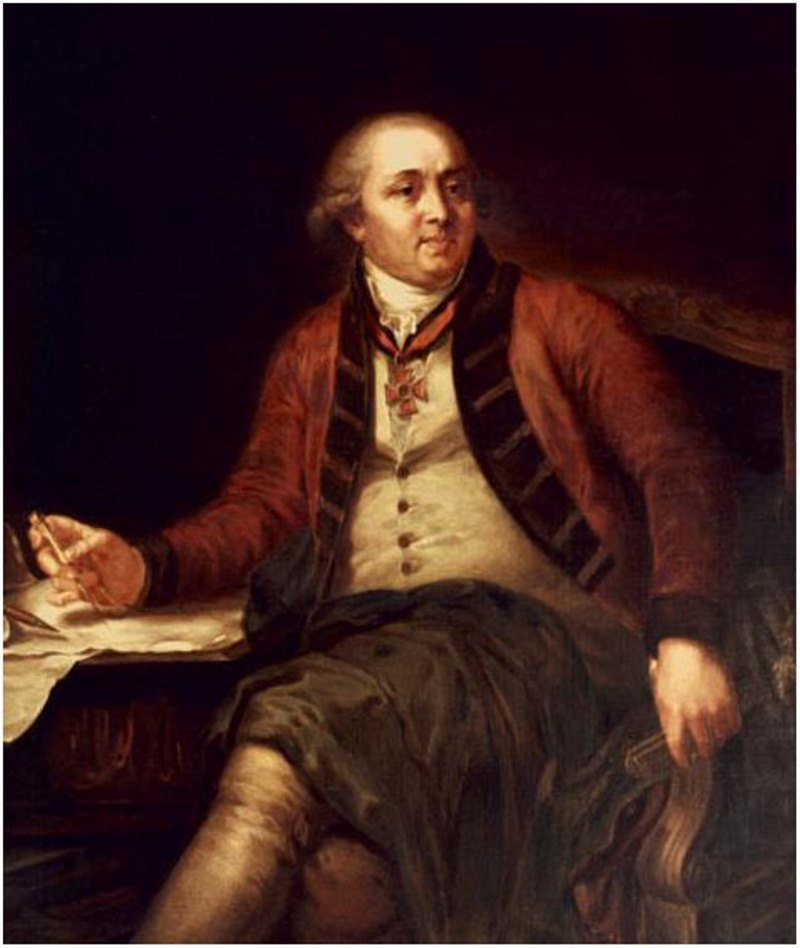
Portrait by Stepan Shchukin, c. 1794–1800

Ivan Yegorovich Starov (Russian: Ива́н Его́рович Старо́в; 23 February 1745 – 17 April 1808) was a Russian architect from St. Petersburg who devised the master plans for Yaroslavl, Voronezh, Pskov, Yekaterinoslav, Nikolaev, and many other towns in the Russian Empire. His radial urban master plan for Yaroslavl (1778), cleverly highlighting dozens historic churches and towers, is recognized as one of the World Heritage Sites.

Starov was one of the first graduates of the Moscow University College (1755–1758) and of the Imperial Academy of Arts (1758–1762). He continued his education in Paris (1762–1767) and Rome (1767–1768), becoming apprenticed to Charles De Wailly and other fashionable architects of his day. Back in Russia, he delivered lectures in the Academy of Arts, which nominated him academician (1769) and professor (1785). Starov held the post of the principal architect of St. Petersburg between 1772 and 1774. After that, he worked extensively for Prince Potemkin, helping him to found the major cities of New Russia.

== Biography ==
Ivan Starov was born into a deacon's family. In 1755 he enrolled into the Imperial Moscow University, a year later transferred to the gymnasium of the Russian Academy of Sciences. In 1758 he entered the Imperial Academy of Arts and became the student of Alexander Kokorinov and Jean-Baptiste Vallin de la Mothe. He graduated with honours and received a money grant and a right to travel abroad to study arts. From 1762 to 1768 he travelled, in Paris he studied under Charles de Wailly.

In 1769 he returned to St Petersburg and designed the project of the szlachta wing for the cadet corps. For this project he was admitted to membership of the academy. In a year Starov was ranked an adjunct professor, in 1770 he was promoted to professor. Between 1772 and 1774 he headed the Committee on Stone Building of Moscow and St Petersburg. In 1790 Starov created the project of Nikolaev city next to the wharf between the Southern Bug and the Inhul rivers. In 1794 he was promoted to adjunct rector.

Ivan Starov was buried in the Lazarevskoe Cemetery of the Alexander Nevsky Lavra.

== Family ==
On 30 March 1771, Starov married Natalia Deimdova, daughter of rich mine owner Grigory Akinfiyevich Demidov. The prominent architect Alexander Kokorinov was Starov's best man on the wedding ceremony. On 20 May 1771, the newly wed purchased a mansion on Vasilyevsky Island. In that house three sons were born — Alexander, Peter and Paul. In 1776 the family moved to the Fontanka Embankment.

== Works ==
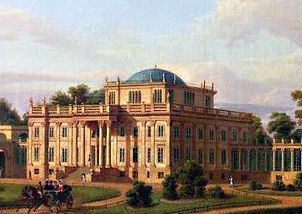
One of Starov's Neoclassical châteaux in White Russia

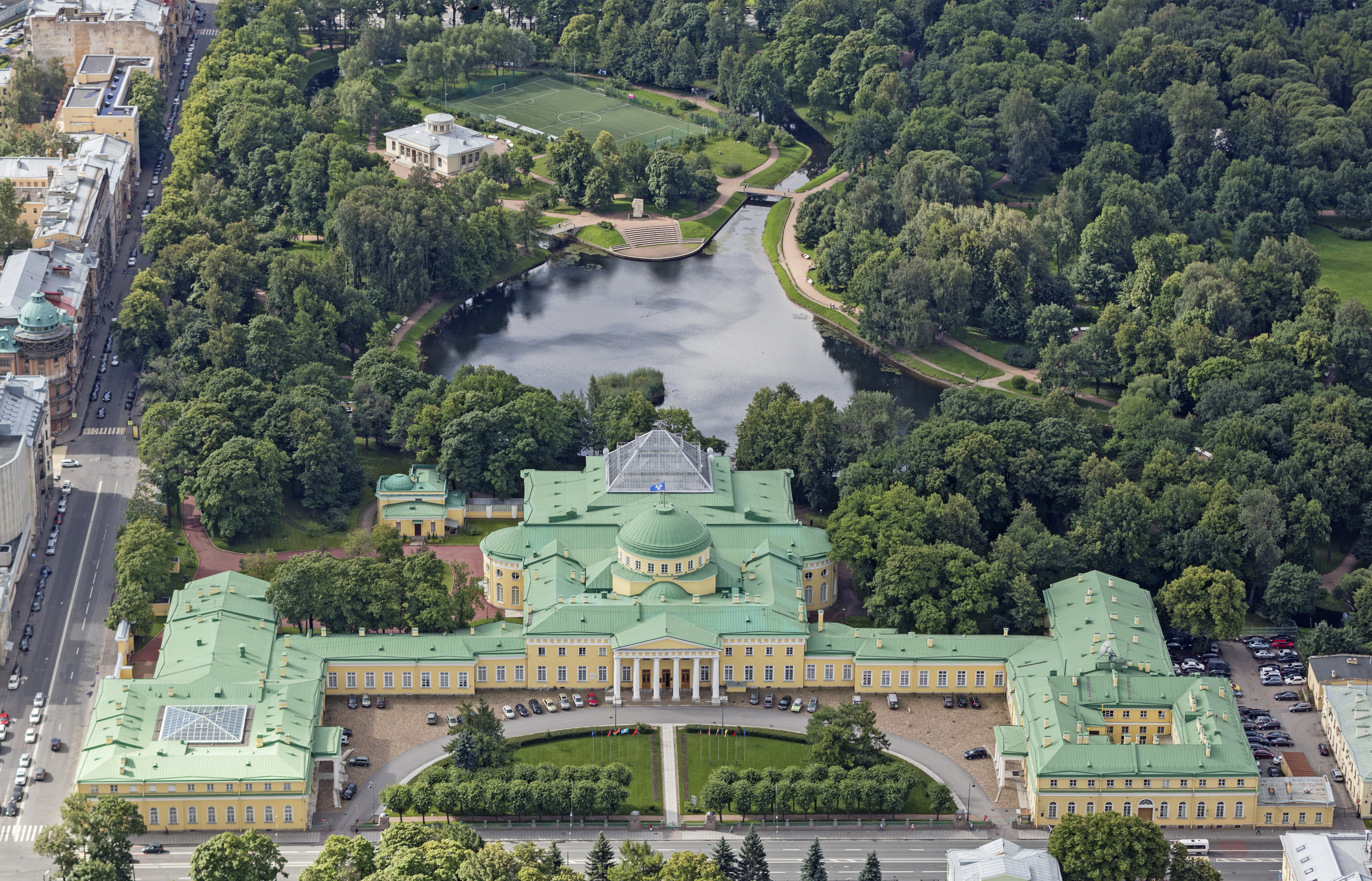
Aerial view of Tauride Palace

Apart from urban planning, Starov was a leading representative of the early neoclassical architecture in Russia. His major projects chronicle the transition of national architecture from the late Rinaldiesque baroque of the 1760s to the magnificent Neoclassical palaces of the 1780s:

- 1769 – Demidov dacha near Peterhof, commissioned by Starov's brother-in-law, Alexander Demidov, and destroyed by the Nazis.
- 1773 – chateau and church in Bogoroditsk, commissioned by Count Bobrinsky.
- 1773 – chateau and church in Nikolskoye near Moscow, commissioned by Prince Gagarin.
- 1774 – chateau, gothic gate and park in Taytsy near Gatchina, commissioned by Alexander Demidov.
- 1775 – chateau and park pavilions in Suvoritsy near St. Petersburg, commissioned by Pyotr Demidov.
- 1778 – Holy Trinity Cathedral of the Alexander Nevsky Lavra in St. Petersburg, commissioned by the Holy Synod.
- 1783 – Gate Church and iron-cast grille of the Alexander Nevsky Lavra, commissioned by the Holy Synod.
- 1783 – Tauride Palace in St. Petersburg, commissioned by Prince Potemkin.
- 1783 – chateau in Ostrovki on the Neva River, commissioned by Prince Potemkin, currently in ruins from neglect.
- 1784 – Pella Palace on the Neva River, commissioned by Catherine II of Russia and demolished by her son Paul.
- 1784 – Lithuanian prison castle at the intersection of the Moyka and the Kryukov Canal in St. Petersburg, demolished after the 1917 fire.
- 1786 – Potemkin Palace in Yekaterinoslav, commissioned by Prince Potemkin.
- 1789 – Prince Vladimir Church, Saint Petersburg, completed
- 1790 – Potemkin mansion in Bogoyavlensk-on-the-Bug, commissioned by Prince Potemkin.
- 1790 – magistrate and cathedral in Nikolaev, commissioned by Prince Potemkin.
- 1794 – chateau and pavilions in Voznesenskoye on the Neva River, commissioned by Count Sheremetyev.
- 1795 – Potemkin mausoleum, commissioned by Potemkin's niece Countess Branicka but never executed.
- 1796 – Theotokos Cathedral in Kazan, commissioned by the Kazan Governorate and destroyed by the Communists.

The Kherson Cathedral in present-day Ukraine and the Gomel Palace in present-day Belarus are also frequently attributed to Starov.

== Sources ==
- "Старов, Иван Егорович" . Brockhaus and Efron Encyclopedic Dictionary (in Russian). 1906.
- Kozyreva, M. (2011). "И никогда не будет мной забыт огромный дом..." (Васильевский остров, 6-я линия, 17) (in Russian). St Petersburg: Istoriya Peterburga. pp. 36–46.
