= Connétable =

Connétable or Connetable may refer to:

- Connetable (Gatchina), an obelisk and square in Gatchina, Russia
- Connétable (Jersey and Guernsey), elected heads of the Parishes in Jersey and Guernsey islands
- Constable (French: Connétable)
- Grand Constable of France, the First Officer of the Crown of France
