= Pavlovsk Palace =

18th-century Russian Imperial residence

Coordinates: 59°41′9″N 30°27′12″E

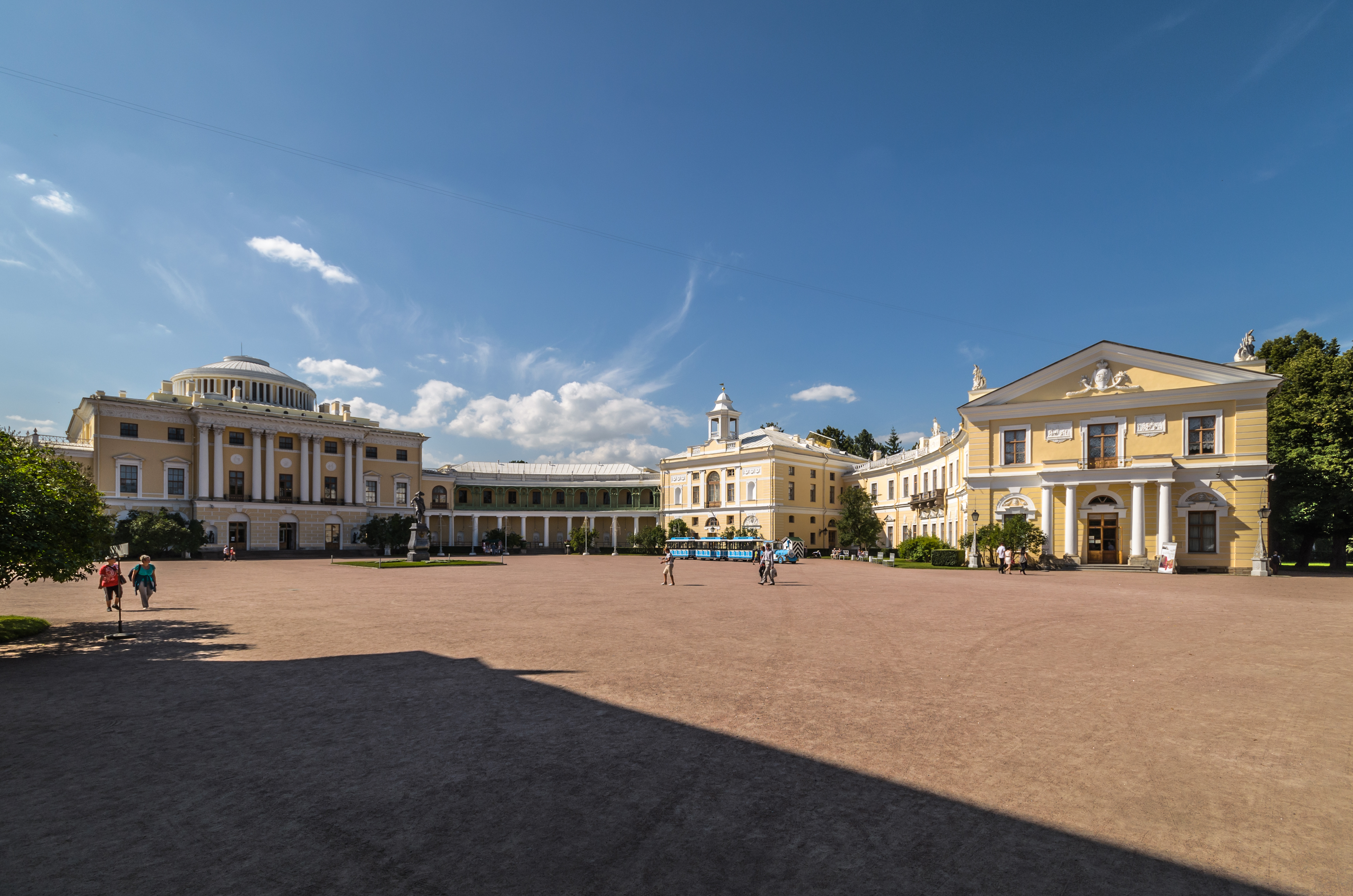
Pavlovsk Palace

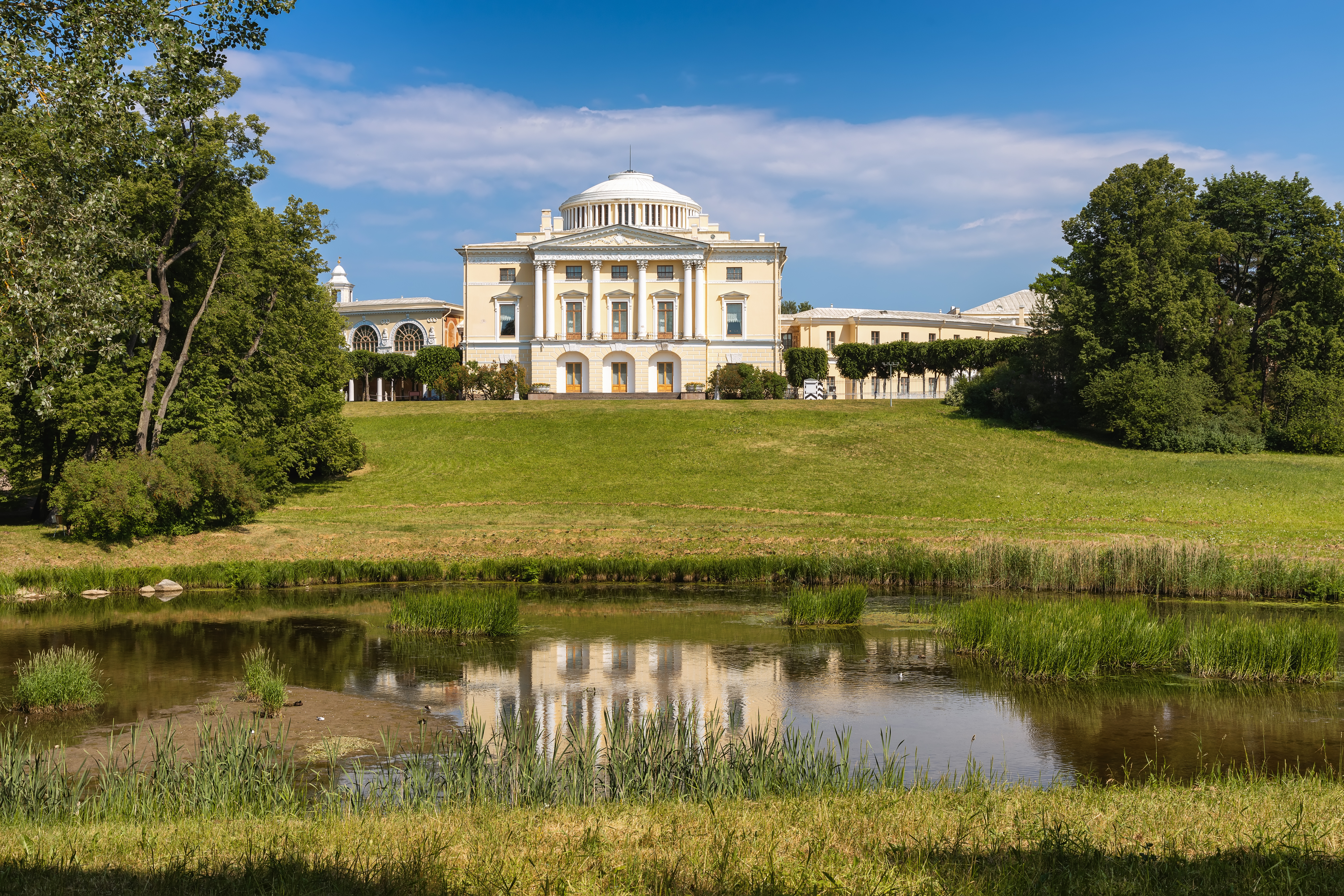
West facade of Pavlovsk Palace

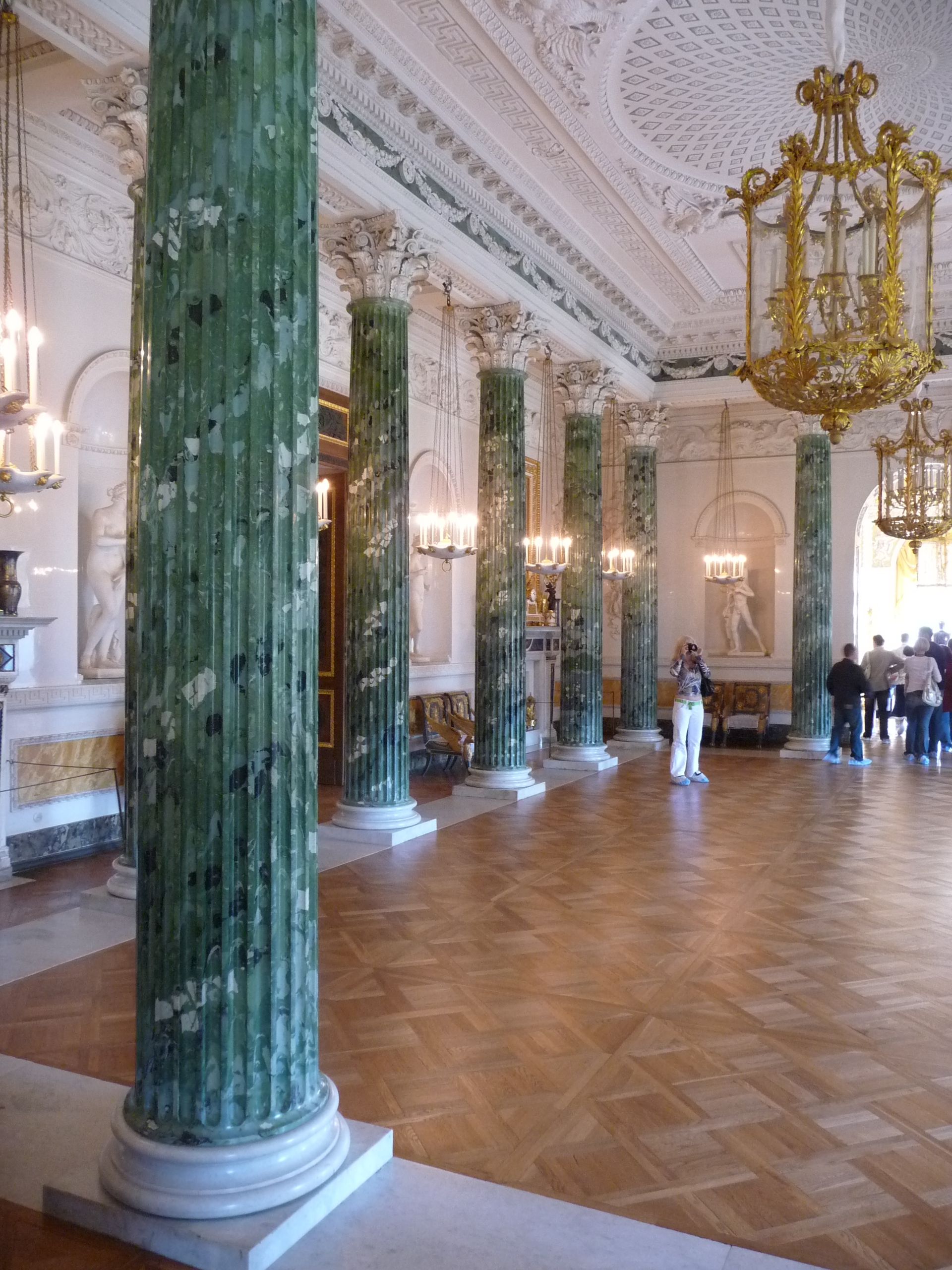
Greek Hall of Pavlovsk Palace

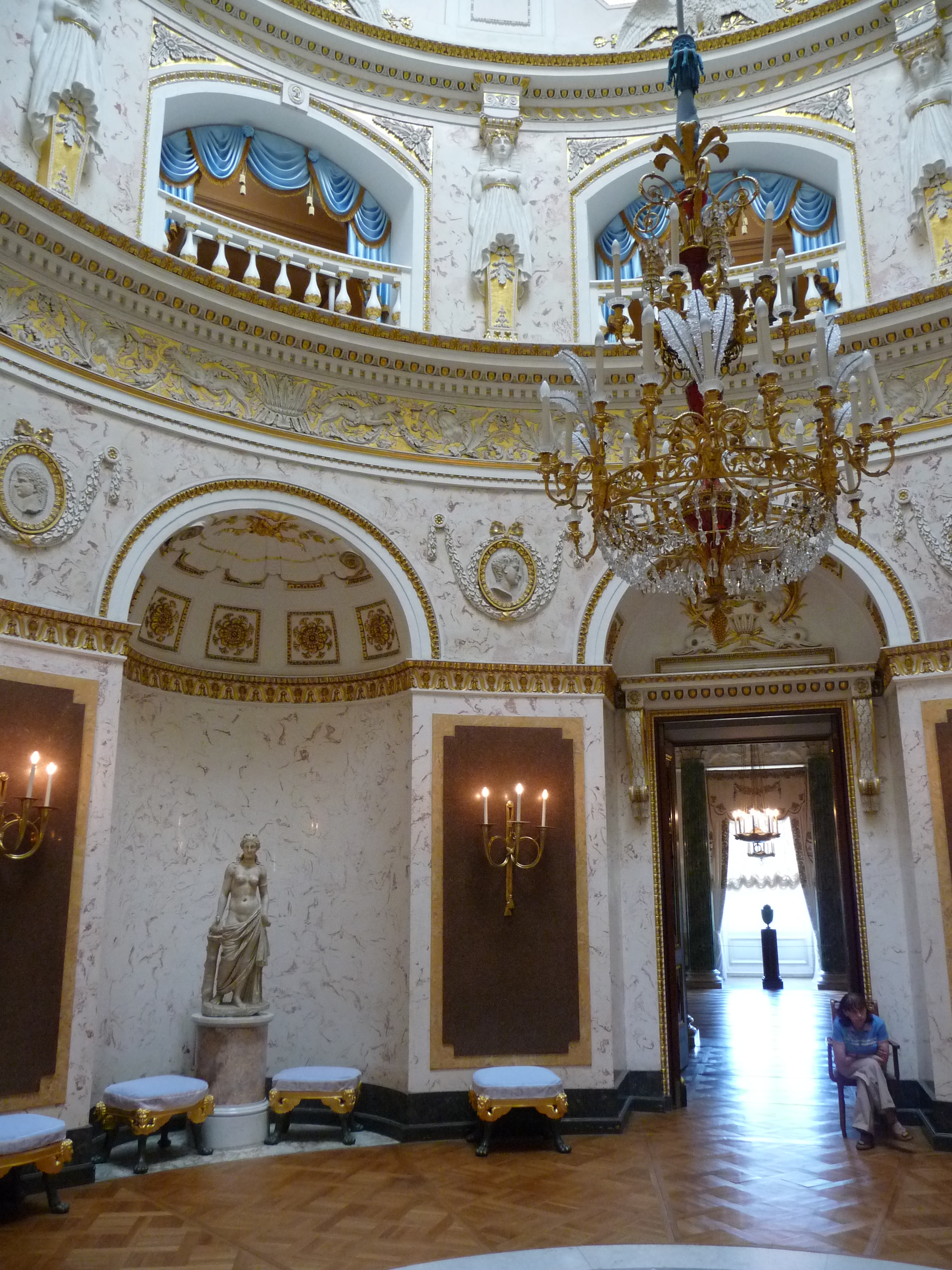
Italian Hall of Pavlovsk Palace

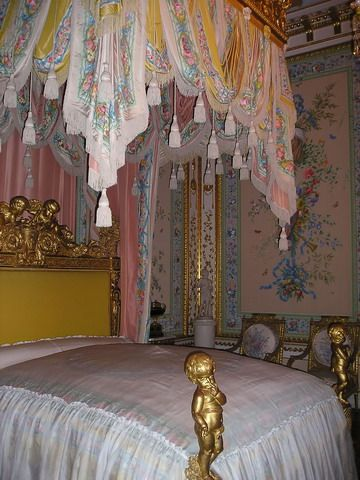
State Bedroom of Pavlovsk Palace

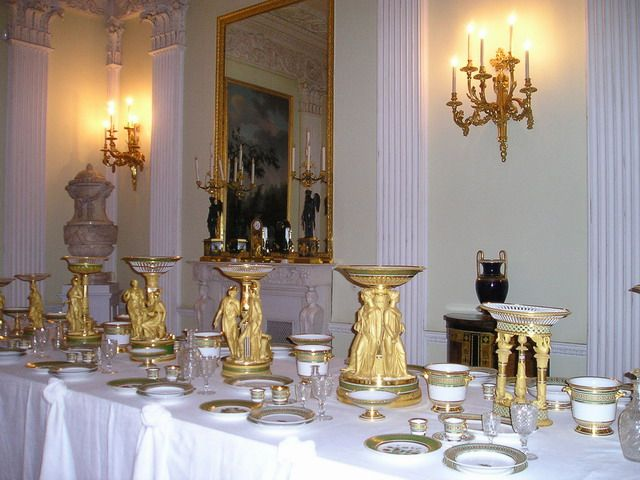
Dining room of Pavlovsk Palace

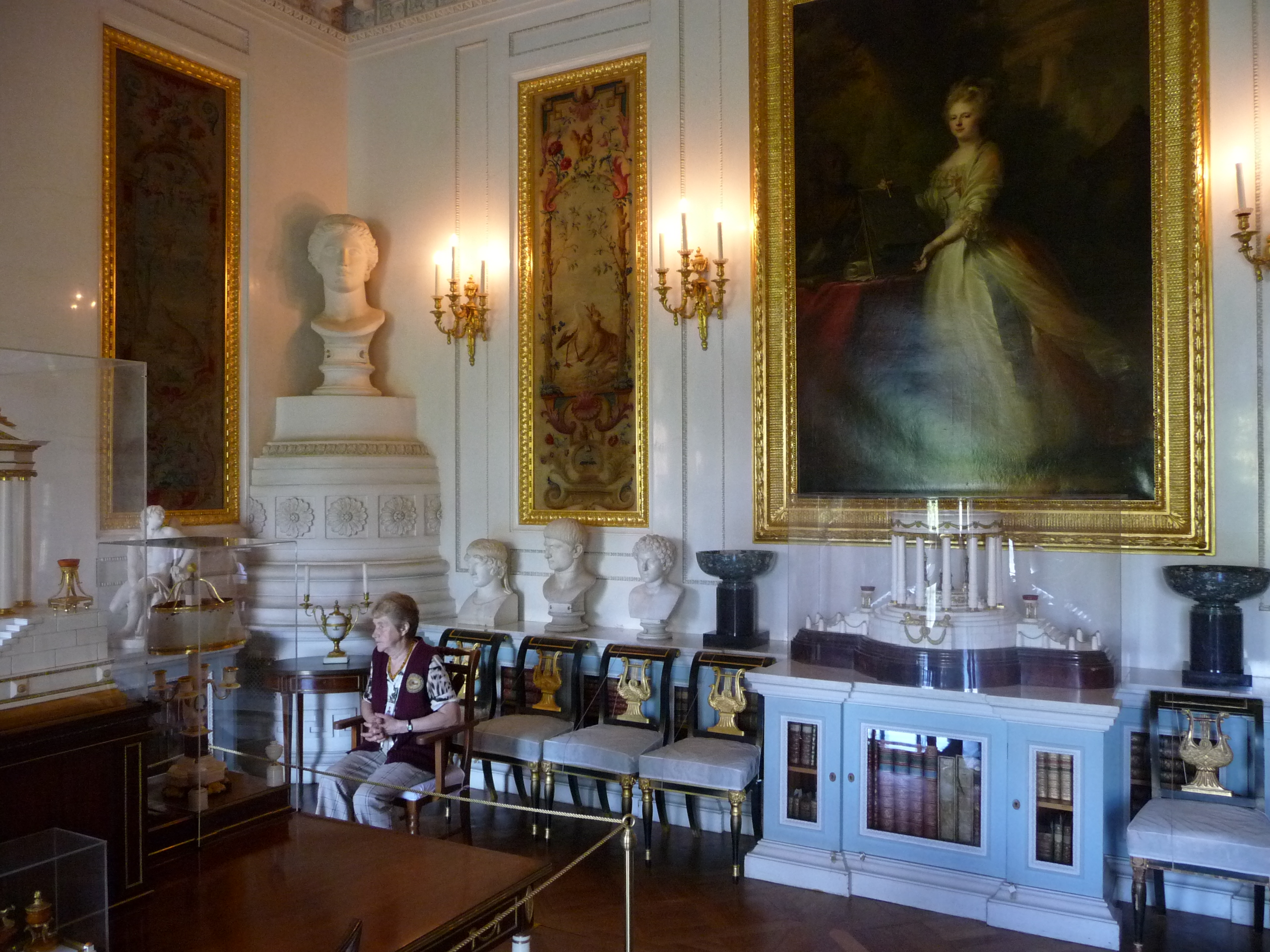
The library of Paul I

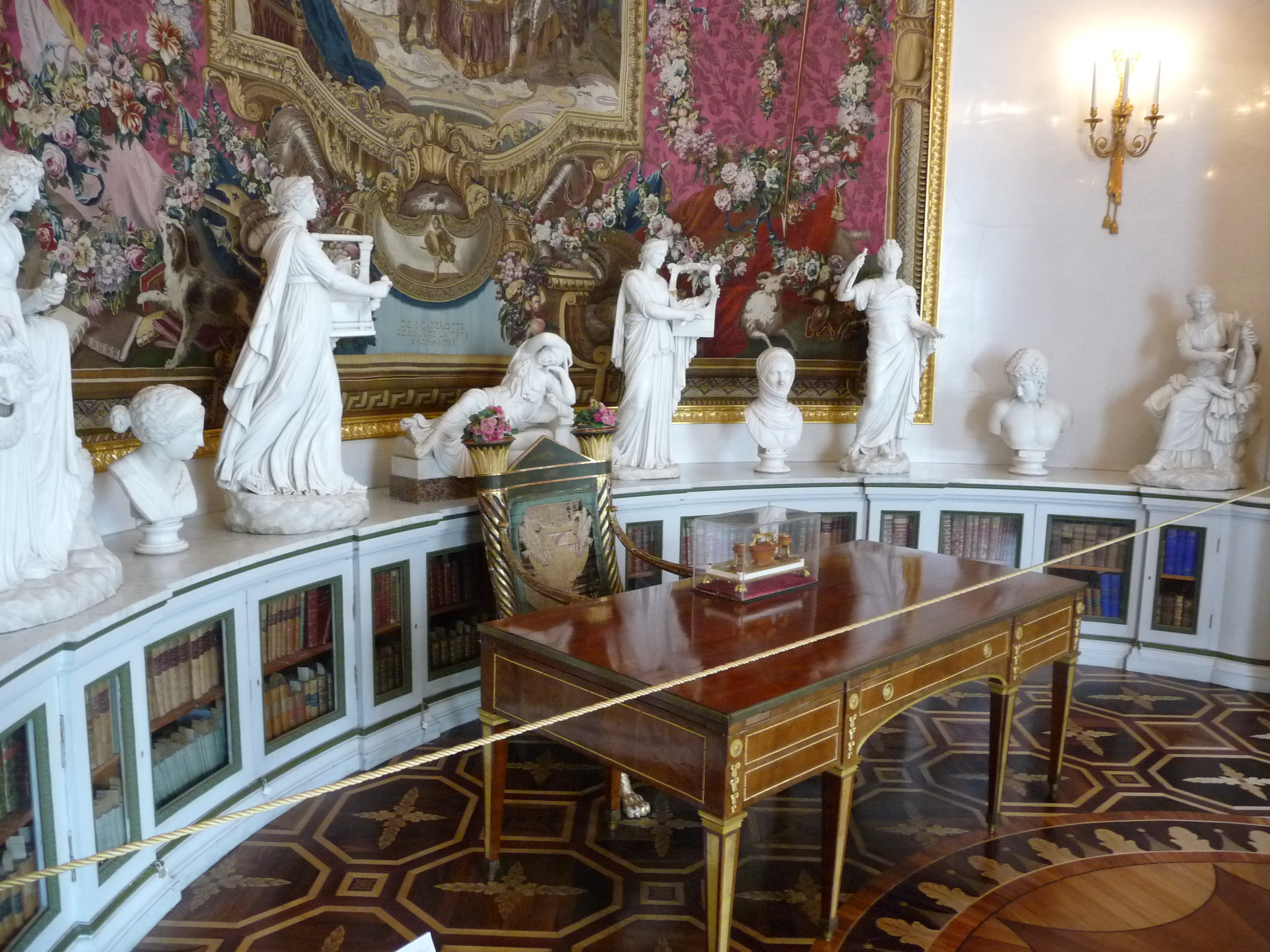
The cabinet of Maria Feodorovna

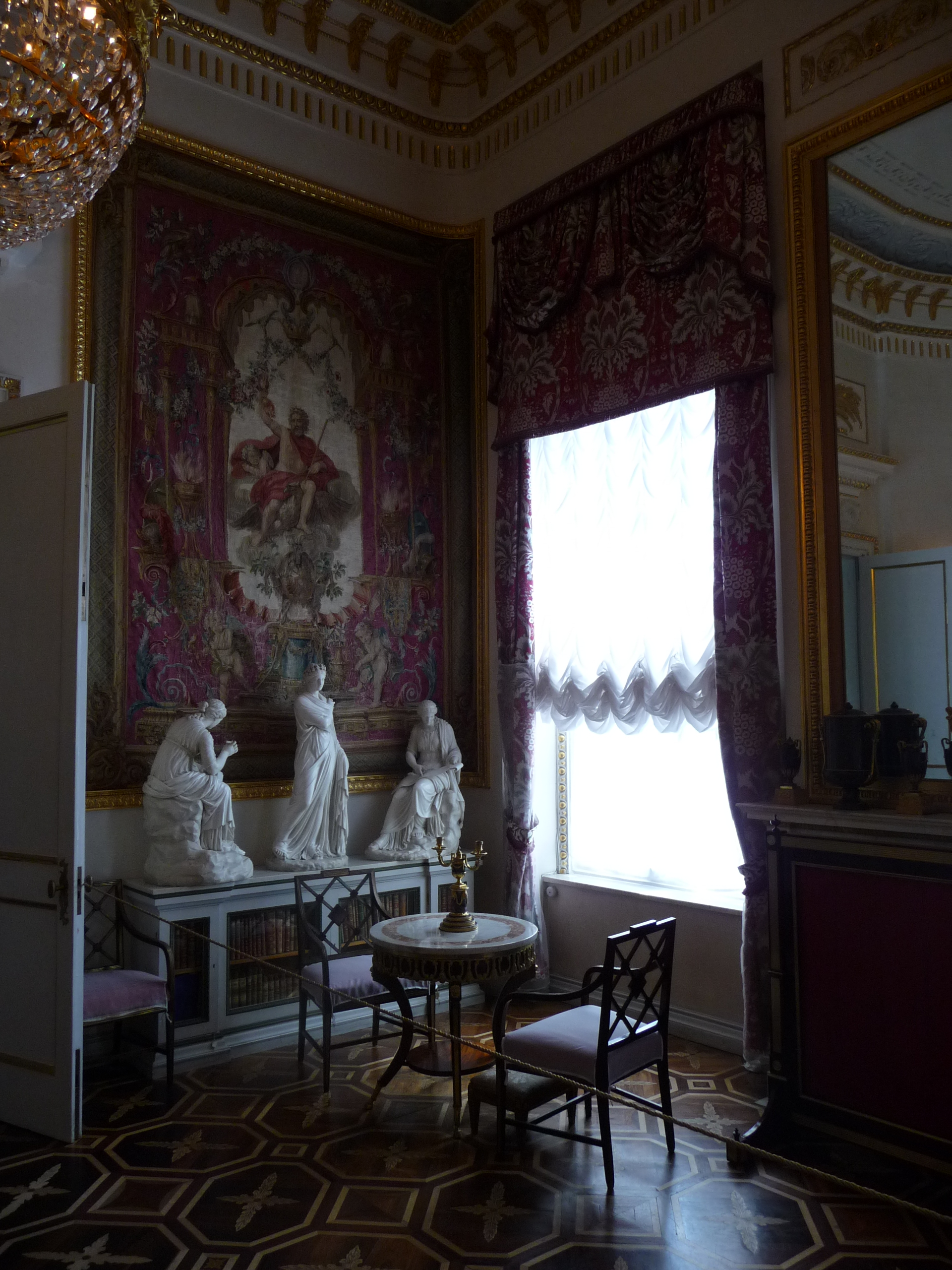
Cabinet of Maria Feodorovna

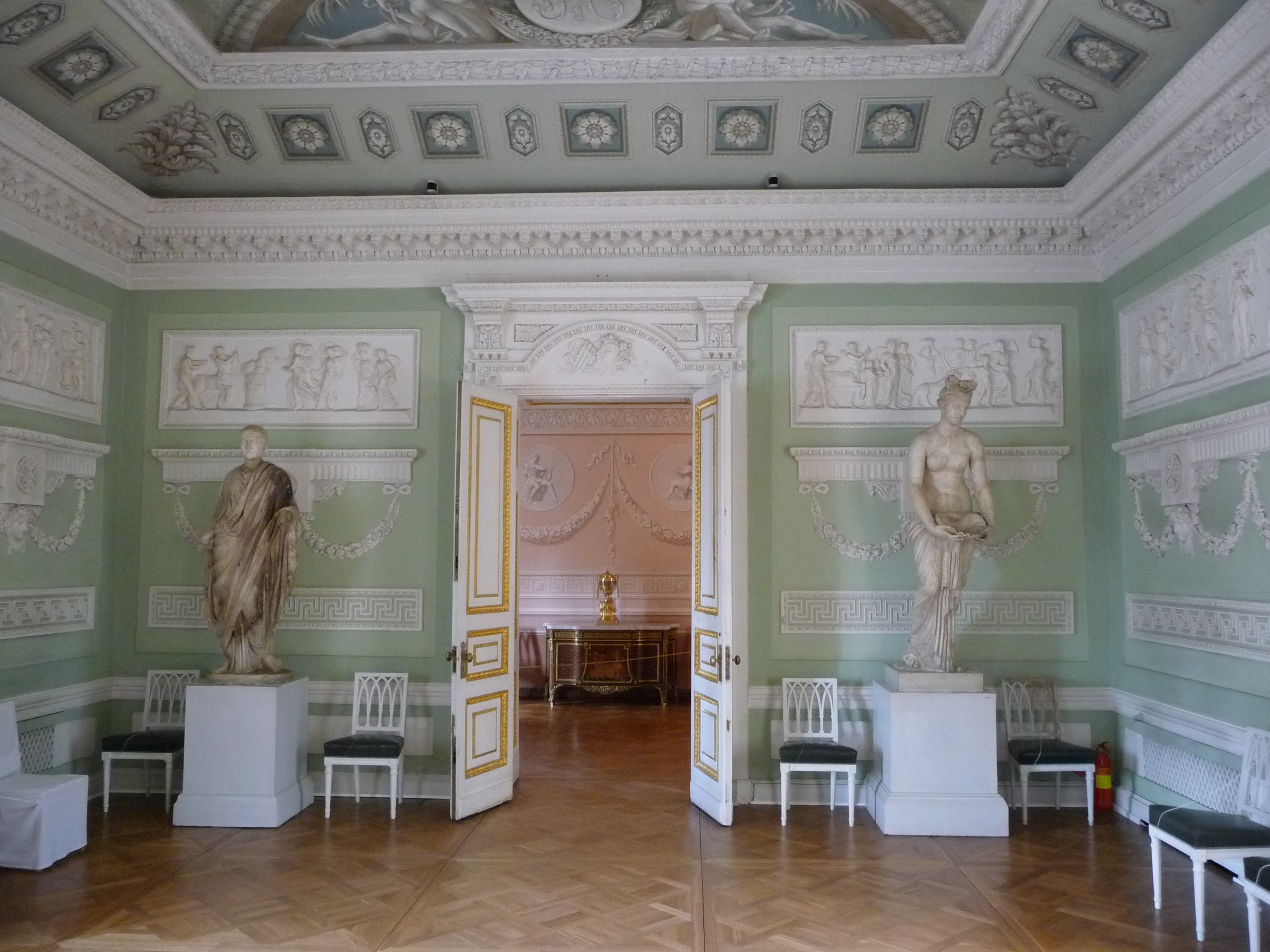
Pavlovsk Palace interior

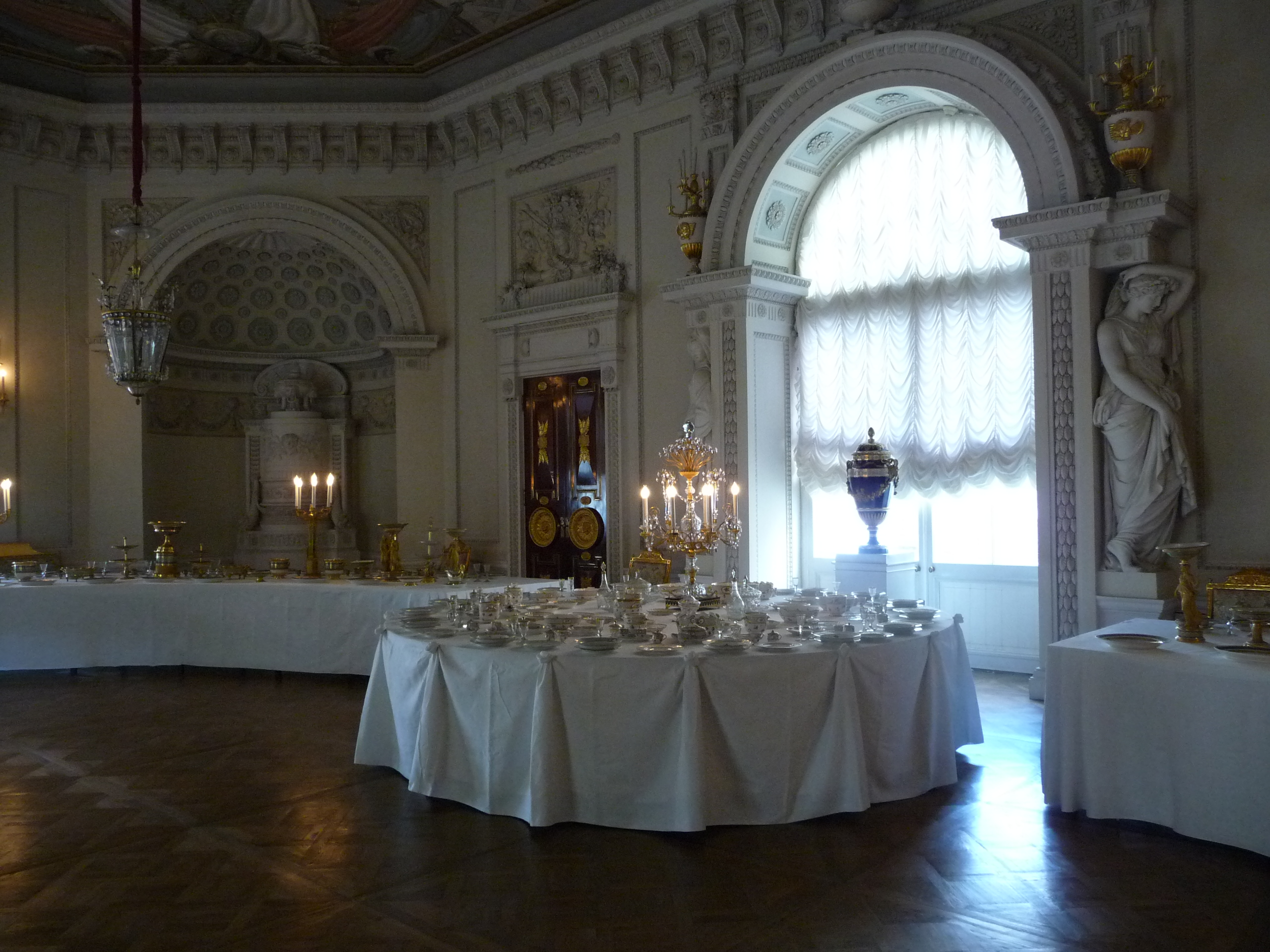
Throne room

Pavlovsk Palace (Russian: Павловский дворец) is an 18th-century Russian Imperial residence built by the order of Catherine the Great for her son Grand Duke Paul, in Pavlovsk, within Saint Petersburg. After his death, it became the home of his widow, Maria Feodorovna. The palace and the large English garden surrounding it are now a Russian state museum and public park.

== History ==
=== Catherine and Grand Duke Paul ===
In 1777, the Empress Catherine II of Russia gave a parcel of a thousand hectares of forest along the winding Slavyanka River, four kilometers from her residence at Tsarskoye Selo, to her son and heir Paul I and his wife Maria Feodorovna, to celebrate the birth of their first son, the future Alexander I of Russia. At the time the land was given to Paul and Maria Feodorovna, there were two rustic log lodges called Krik and Krak. Paul and his wife spent the summers of 1777 to 1780 in Krik, while their new homes and the garden were being built.

They began by building two wooden buildings, one kilometer apart. Paul's house, a two-story house in the Dutch style, with small gardens, was called "Marienthal", or the "Valley of Maria". Maria's house was a small wooden house with a cupola and flower beds, named "Paullust", or "Paul's Joy". Paul and Maria Feodorovna began to create picturesque "ruins", a Chinese kiosk, Chinese bridges and classical temples in the English landscape garden style which had spread rapidly across Europe in the second half of the 18th century.

In 1780, Catherine the Great loaned her official architect, the Scotsman Charles Cameron, to design a palace on a hillside overlooking the Slavyanka River, near the site of Marienthal. Cameron had studied under English architect Isaac Ware, who was close to William Kent. Kent introduced the Palladian style of architecture into England with his work at Chiswick House for Lord Burlington. Through this connection Cameron became familiar with the original plans of Palladio, which were in the personal collection of Lord Burlington. This style was the major influence on Cameron when he designed Pavlovsk.

Cameron began his project not with the palace itself but with two classical pavilions. The first was the Temple of Friendship, a circular Dorian temple with sixteen columns supporting a low dome, containing a statue of Catherine the Great. It was placed at a bend of the Slavyanka River, below the future palace, and was surrounded by silver poplars and transplanted Siberian pines. The second was the Apollo Colonnade, a double row of columns with an entablature, forming a setting for a reproduction of the Belvedere Apollo. It was placed at the entrance of the park, and it was made of porous limestone with a coarse finish; the surfaces suggest that they had been aged by centuries of weather. At the same time the Slavyanka River was dammed, to create a lake which would mirror the facade of the palace above.

Maria Feodorovna also insisted in having several rustic structures which recalled the palace where she grew up at Étupes, forty miles from Basel, in what was then the Duchy of Württemberg and today is in Alsace. Cameron constructed a small Swiss chalet with a library; a dairy of rough stones with a thatched roof, where milk products were kept and prepared, and an aviary in the form of a small classical temple with metal netting between the Dorian columns, which was filled with nightingales, goldfinch, starlings and quail. For the palace itself, Cameron conceived a country house which seems to have been based on a design by Andrea Palladio shown in a woodcut in his book I quattro libri dell'architettura, for the Villa Capra "La Rotonda" near Vicenza in Italy. This same drawing was later used by Thomas Jefferson in his design for the University of Virginia. The palace he designed had a cube-shaped central block three stories high with a low dome supported by sixty-four columns. On either side of the building were two single story colonnades of curved open winged galleries connected to service buildings one and a half stories high. Each facade of the palace was decorated with molded friezes and reliefs.

In September 1781, as construction of the Pavlovsk Palace began, Paul and Maria set off on a journey to Austria, Italy, France and Germany. They traveled under the incognito of "The Count and Countess of the North". During their travels they saw the palaces and French gardens of Versailles and Chantilly, which strongly influenced the future appearance of Pavlovsk Park. King Louis XVI presented them with four Gobelin tapestries, Marie Antoinette presented Maria Feodorovna with a sixty-piece toilet set of Sèvres porcelain, and they ordered more sets of porcelain and purchased statues, busts, paintings, furniture and paintings, all for Pavlovsk. While they traveled, they kept in contact almost daily with Kuchelbecker, the supervisor of construction at Pavlovsk, sending back and forth drawings, plans and notes on the smallest details.

Paul and Maria Feodorovna returned in November 1782, and they continued to fill Pavlovsk with art objects. A shipment of antique marbles, statues, busts, urns, and pottery discovered and purchased at Pompei, arrived in 1783. Sixteen sets of furniture, over two hundred pieces, were ordered from Paris between 1783 and 1785 for the State Rooms. In 1784, twelve Hubert Robert landscapes were commissioned for Pavlovsk. The couple purchased ninety-six clocks from Europe. The Imperial Glass factory, made special chandeliers for each room. In the midst of the construction, tensions grew between them and Cameron. Cameron was used to the unlimited budget for materials given him by Catherine the Great, while Catherine gave very little money to Paul; and Cameron was annoyed by the furniture, tapestries and fireplaces brought back from Europe by Maria Feodorovna without consulting him. Maria Feodorovna in turn was annoyed by the bright polychrome decoration and Pompeian arabesques used by Cameron, and wanted more delicate colors, and Paul did not like anything that resembled the style of his mother's house, the Catherine Palace at Tsarskoye Selo.

The tensions led to a parting in 1786. Cameron left to build a new palace for Catherine in the Crimea. He had finished entry vestibule and the five rooms of the private apartments. The work of decorating the interior was taken over by an Italian architect, Vincenzo Brenna, from Florence, who had come to Russia in 1783. Brenna designed interiors which reflected Paul's taste for Roman classicism. He created the white and gold Halls of War and Peace, on either side of the Greek Hall by Cameron, which had a colonnade of green false marble columns, resembling a Greek temple. He made the Italian hall into a replica of a Roman temple, and he built the State Bedroom for Maria Feodorovna as an imitation of the state bedroom of the King of France, with a huge gilded bed, and cream silk wallpaper painted in tempera with colorful flowers, fruit, musical instruments and gardening tools.

=== Paul I and Maria Feodorovna ===
Catherine the Great died in 1796, and Paul became Emperor. He decided to enlarge Pavlovsk into a palace suitable for a royal residence, adding two new wings on either side of the main building, and a church attached to the south wing. Between 1797 and 1799, he lavished money and the finest materials on Brenna's interiors. The reign of Emperor Paul did not last long. He alienated the nobles, and became increasingly fearful of conspiracies. His fears were justified; the Emperor Paul was murdered by members of his court in 1801, and his son Alexander became Emperor. Pavlovsk Palace became the residence of the Empress Maria Feodorovna (1759–1828), the mother of both Emperor Alexander I of Russia and Emperor Nicholas I of Russia.

She turned the house into a memorial to her murdered husband, filled with his furniture and portraits, and made the house a showcase for finest 18th-century French furnishings, paintings, sculpture and porcelain. Another disaster struck Pavlovsk in 1803; a fire caused by a defective chimney destroyed a major part of the interior of the palace, including all the decor of the State Apartments and living rooms. Most of the furniture was saved, along with some door panels, fireplaces and mirrors, but most of the Palace had to be rebuilt.

Maria Feodorovna brought Cameron and Brenna's young assistant, the Italian architect Carlo Rossi, to help restore the Palace. She also employed a Russian architect, Andrei Voronykhin, who had been born a serf, and was trained in decoration and design, who rose to become the architect of Kazan Cathedral in St. Petersburg. Voronykhin was named chief architect of Pavlovsk by Maria Feodorovna. He brought back the architect Quarenghi, who had redecorated five rooms on the main floor, to recreate his work. He remade some of the rooms, such as the Tapestry Room and the State Bedroom, exactly as they had been, but for other rooms he added decoration inspired by Roman models discovered at Pompeii and Herculaneum; Roman-style lamps, furniture, Roman couches, and chairs copied after those of Roman senators.

Following the French taste of the time for Egyptian art, he added black Egyptian statues in the entry vestibule of the Palace, He redesigned the Greek and Italian halls, replacing the molding on the walls with false marble, and he added a Russian touch; fireplaces faced with Russian lapis-lazuli and jasper, which had originally been in the Mikhailovsky Palace that Paul had built in St. Petersburg. Voronykhin also made plans for a semi-circular library in one of the wings, which was later built by Carlo Rossi, and he redesigned the private apartments of Maria Feodorovna on the ground floor, which included a library, boudoir and bedroom. He installed French doors and large windows in the apartment, so the flower garden outside seemed to be part of the interior.

In 1805 Voronykhin built the Centaur bridge in the park, and the Visconti bridge, which crossed the Slavyanka at a point it was filled with water lilies. His last construction in the park was the Rose Pavilion, built in 1811, a simple structure surrounded entirely by rosebushes. The Rose Pavilion was the site of a grand fete on 12 July 1814, celebrating the return of Alexander I to St. Petersburg after the defeat of Napoleon. For the occasion, architect Pietro de Gottardo Gonzaga built a ballroom the size of the Rose Pavilion itself in just seventeen days, and surrounded it with huge canvases of Russian villagers celebrating the victory. The ball inside the pavilion opened with a Polonaise led by Alexander and his mother, and ended with a huge display of fireworks. In her later years Maria Feodorovna had a literary salon at Pavlovsk, which was frequented by poet Vasily Zhukovsky, fabulist Ivan Krylov, and historian Nikolai Karamzin.

The last great St. Petersburg architect to work at Pavlovsk was Carlo Rossi, who in 1824 designed the library, which contained more than twenty thousand books as well as collections of rare coins and butterflies. He also designed the Corner Salon, where Maria Feodorovna received guests such as the first American Ambassador to Russia, John Quincy Adams, and the Lavender Room, whose walls were made of lilac-colored false marble, matching the lilac flowers outside the windows. These rooms were furnished with furniture made of native Russian woods, including Karelian birch, poplar and walnut.

=== Later history ===
Maria Feodorovna died on 24 October 1828, fourteen days after her sixty-seventh birthday. She left the house to her younger son, Michael, and specified that none of the furniture should be taken away. After Michael's death, it went to the second son of Nicholas I, Konstantine Nikolayevich. It then passed to his widow and then their eldest son, Konstantine Konstantinovich. Her descendants respected the will, and turned the house into a family museum, just as it was when she died.

=== Russian Revolution ===
At the time of the Russian Revolution in 1917, the eldest son of Constantine Constantinovich, Prince Ioann Konstantinovich of Russia, along with his wife, Princess Helen of Serbia, the daughter of King Peter I of Serbia, were living in one of the wings of Pavlovsk, together with his father's widowed sister Queen Olga of Greece. As the political situation deteriorated, they left, and the house was left to the care of Alexander Polovotsoff, director of the Art Institute and the Museum of Applied Arts in St. Petersburg.

When Lenin and the Bolsheviks seized power in November 1917, Polovtsoff went to the Winter Palace, found Anatoly Lunacharsky, the Commissar of Enlightenment of the new government, and demanded that Pavlovsk be saved as a museum. Lunacharsky agreed and named him Commissar Curator of Pavlovsk. He returned to the Palace and found that a group of revolutionary sailors had searched the Palace for weapons and taken a few sabers, but otherwise everything was in its place. He hired former soldiers to guard the house, put all the furniture into the main building, made an inventory of all the treasures in the Palace, and successfully resisted demands from various revolutionary committees for dishes, chairs, tables, and all the books from the library. He was able to persuade Lunacharsky himself to come to Pavlovsk.

After Lunacharsky's visit, Pavlovsk was officially confiscated, but turned into a museum, open to the public two or three days a week. Having succeeded in saving the Palace, Polovtsoff took family and belongings and slipped across the border to Finland and moved to Paris.

=== World War II ===
The German attack on the Soviet Union in June 1941 and the swiftness of the German advance took the Soviet government by surprise. The morning after the attack, the curators of Pavlovsk, under the direction of museum curator Anatoliy Kuchumov, began to pack as many of art objects as possible, starting with the Sèvres porcelain toilet set given by Louis XVI to Maria Feodorovna and Paul in 1780. Ninety-six hours after the announcement of the beginning of the war, the first thirty-four crates were being carried from the palace by horse-drawn cart. Boards were put over the windows, and sand on the floor of the Palace. Thirty curators often worked by candlelight, and by July there were air raids. The paintings, chandeliers, crystal, porcelain, rare furniture, and works of ivory and amber were packed and sent first. They worked with great care – each piece of furniture had to be carefully dismantled, porcelain vases had to be separated from the bases, and delicate clocks had to have their casing and mechanisms separated and packed separately, with diagrams on how to put them back together. One piece of each set of furniture was saved, and the others left behind. The Roman and Greek antiquities were too heavy and delicate to move, so they were taken to the basements, placed as close together as possible, and then hidden by a brick wall.

By the third week of August thirteen thousand objects, plus all the documentation, had been packed and sent away. Some crates were sent to Gorky, others to Sarapul, and the last group, on 20 August 1941, went to Leningrad, where the crates were stored in the basement of St Isaac's Cathedral. The last shipment included the chandelier from the Italian Hall and the jasper vases from the Greek Hall. On 30 August, the last rail link from Leningrad to Moscow was cut, and the city was under blockade. By 28 August, the Germans were fifty kilometers from Pavlovsk. A Soviet division headquarters was located in one wing of the palace. As the Germans approached, the park and palace came under bombardment. The museum staff began to bury the statues which were too heavy to evacuate. They calculated that the Germans would not dig deeper than one meter eighty centimeters, so they buried all the statues as deep as three meters. The statues of the Three Graces were buried three meters beneath the private garden of Maria Feodorovna. Their calculations were correct; the statues were still there after the war.

On 16 September, the last soldiers left, and the Germans took over Pavlovsk Palace, still occupied by a group of elderly women guardians. The Germans occupied Pavlovsk palace for two and a half years. Officers were quartered in the salons on the first floor, and the ballroom was made into a garage for cars and motorcycles. Barracks were located in the north wing and a hospital in the south wing. German soldiers, Dutch soldiers and Spanish soldiers in special units of the German army occupied the buildings in the park. The sculpture and furniture that remained in the house and all the books of the Rossi Library were taken to Germany. The statue of Emperor Paul in the courtyard was used as a telephone pole. The Germans did not discover the antiquities hidden behind the brick wall in the basement.

Pavlovsk was retaken on 24 January 1944. When the Soviet troops arrived, the palace had already been burning for three days. The main building of the Palace was a hollow shell, without a roof or floors. The north wall had fallen. Most of the parquet floors of the palace had been used as firewood; a few pieces were found in unburned portions of the palace near the stoves. Of the more than 100,000 trees that had been in the park before the War, at least 70 percent had been cut down or destroyed by shelling. All the decorative bridges in the park had been blown up. Eight hundred bunkers had been dug in the park. The Rose Pavilion was gone; the Germans had used the materials to construct a fortified dugout.

== Restoration ==
On 18 February 1944, a meeting was held at the House of Architects in Leningrad to discuss the fate of the ruined Palaces. Academician and architect Aleksei Shchusev, who had designed the Lenin Mausoleum, called for the immediate reconstruction of the Palaces. "If we do not do this", he said, "we who know and remember these palaces in all their glory as they were, then the next generation will never be able to reconstruct them."

Even before the war had ended, the Soviet government decided to restore Pavlovsk and the other ruined palaces around Leningrad. First the mines had to be cleared from the ruins and palace and the park. Then the remaining walls were supported with scaffolding, and casts were made of the remaining molding. Fragments of plaster molding were collected, sorted, and casts made. The color of paint still on the remaining walls was carefully noted for later copying. Photographs and early plans of the palace were brought together to help with the restoration.

As soon as the war ended, a search began for treasures stolen from the Palace. Curators collected pieces of furniture, fabric, the legs of tables and pieces of doors and gilded cornices from the German fortifications around the Palace. In the buildings which had been German headquarters, they found chairs, marble statues and rolled-up paintings from the Palace. They found other furniture and objects as far away as Riga, Tallinn, and in Konigsberg, in Germany. Some precious objects from Pavlovsk left Russia even before the war. Four Gobelins tapestries from Pavlovsk were sold by the Soviet Government to J. Paul Getty, and are now on display in the Getty Museum in Malibu, California.

The restorers used only the original variants of the architectural decoration; those created by Cameron, Brenna, Voronykhin, and Rossi. The only changes permitted were to use modern materials. Columns made of wood were replaced by poured concrete or bricks, and the ceilings of the Italian and Greek Halls were made of steel and concrete so they would be fireproof. A special school, the Mukhina Leningrad Higher Artistic Industry School, was created in Leningrad to teach the arts of restoring architectural details, furniture, and art objects. This school produced a corps of restoration experts who worked on all the palaces around Leningrad. The work was meticulous and difficult, and proceeded very slowly.

In 1950, after six years of planting new trees, parts of the park opened to the public. In 1955, the restoration of the facade of the Palace was completed, and restoration of the interiors began. Fortunately for the restorers, the original plans by Cameron, Brenna, Voronykhin and Rossi still existed. Also, fragments of the original interior molding, cornices, friezes and the frames for the carvings, bas-reliefs, medallions and paintings still remained, and could be copied. In addition, there were 2500 photographic negatives taken in the early century by Benois, and another eleven thousand photographs taken just before the war.

The chief of the restoration, Feodor Oleinik, was insistent that all the restoration be faithful to the original work: "Pay attention and do not use later details", he demanded. "Only the original variant, only that done by Cameron, Brenna, Vornykhin, or Rossi." Old techniques of artisans of the 18th century, such as painting false marble and gilding furniture, had to be relearned and applied. A silk workshop was opened in Moscow to recreate the original woven fabrics for wall coverings and upholstery, copying the texture, color and thread counts of the originals. In forty rooms of the Palace, painted decoration on the walls and ceilings had to be precisely recreated in the original colors and designs. A Master painter and six helpers recreated the original trompe l'oeil ceilings and wall paintings.

Once the interior walls and decoration had been exactly recreated, the next step was the furnishings. The twelve thousand pieces of furniture and art objects removed from their original places, from paintings and tapestries to water pitchers and glasses, had to be put back where they belonged. Furniture, doors, and parquet floors of many different colors of wood which had been burned or stolen were remade exactly like the originals. The crystal chandeliers of the 18th century were exactly copied. In 1957, thirteen years after the Palace had been burned, the first seven rooms were opened to the public.

In 1958, four more rooms were opened, and eleven more in 1960. The Egyptian Vestibule was finished in 1963, and the Italian Room opened in 1965. Eleven more rooms were ready by 1967. By 1977, on the 200th anniversary of the beginning of the Palace, fifty rooms were finished, and the Palace looked again as it had in the time of Maria Feodorovna.

== Pavlovsk Park ==
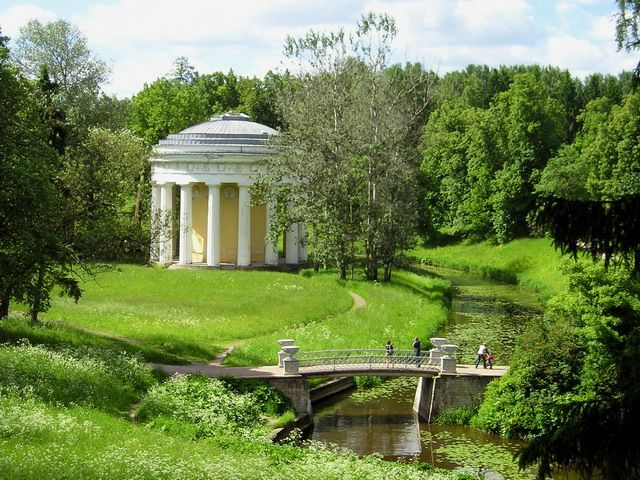
The Temple of Friendship in Pavlovsk Park (1780)

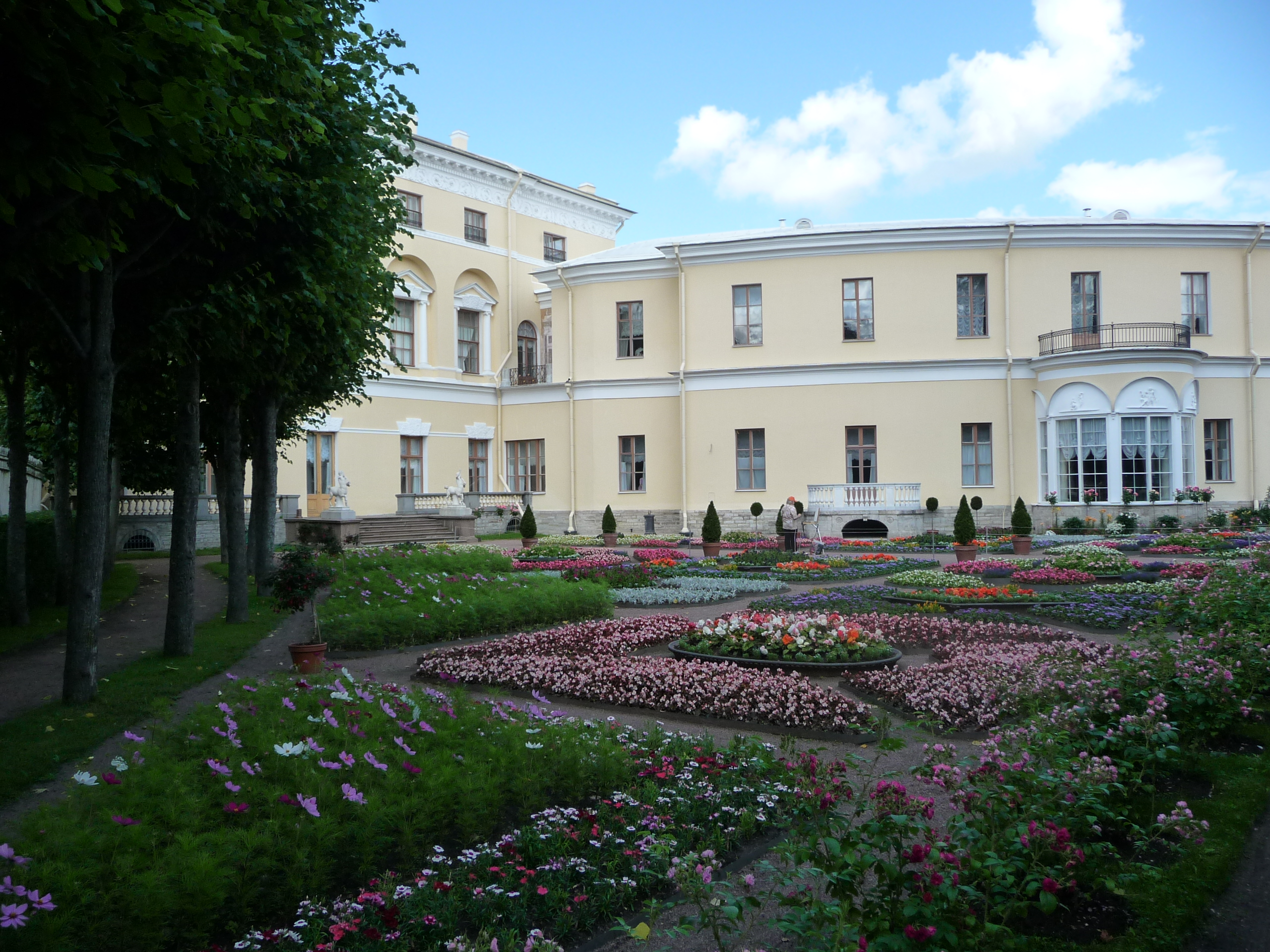
The private garden of Maria Feodorovna. The windows of her private apartment overlooking the garden are visible in the background.

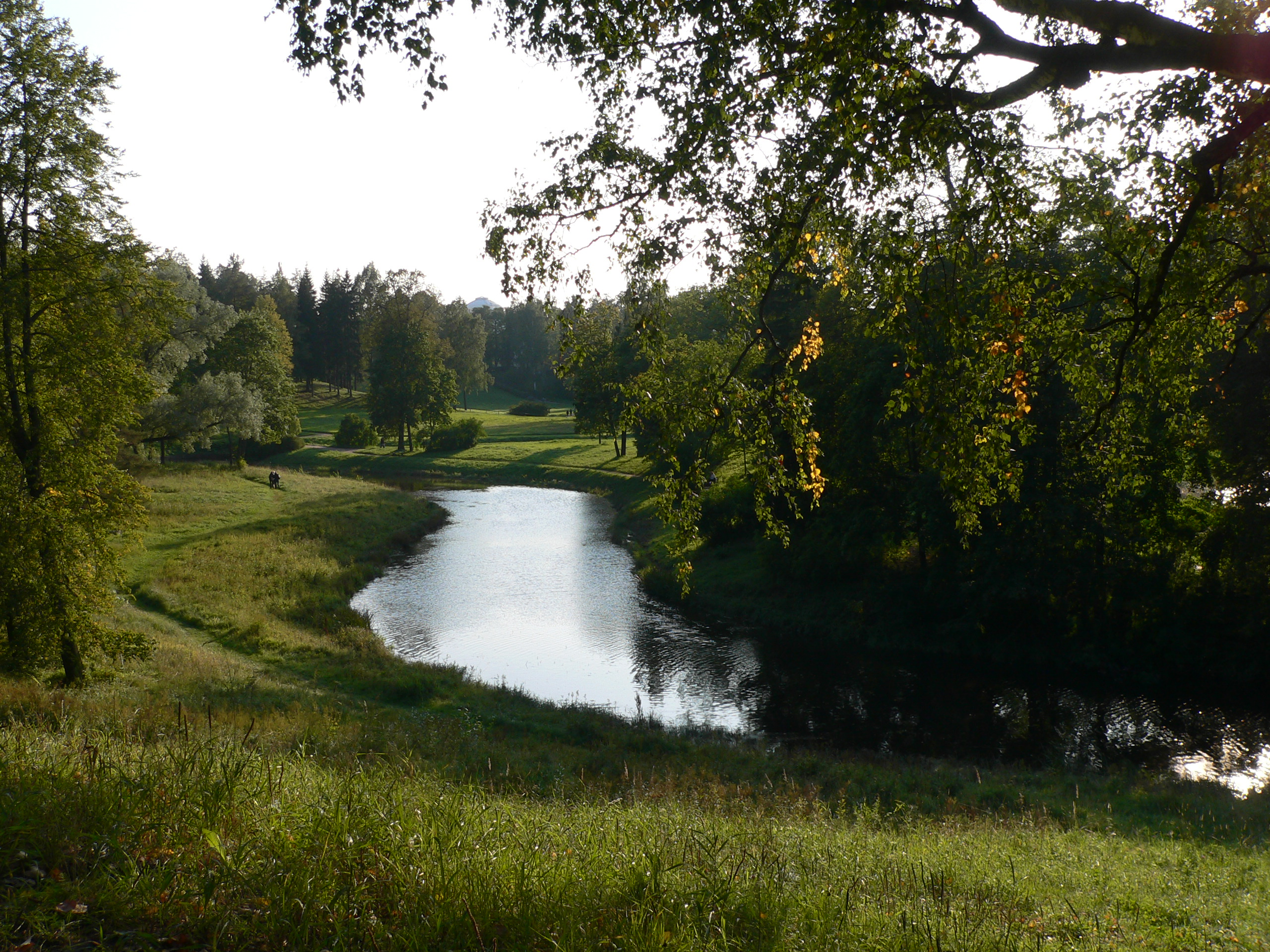
The Slavyanka River in Pavlovsk Park in autumn

Pavlovsk Park was conceived by Cameron as a classic English landscape garden, an idealized landscape filled with picturesque pieces of classical architecture, designed to surprise and please the viewer. Like the English landscape garden, it took much of its inspiration from the romanticized landscape paintings of Claude Lorrain and Hubert Robert. The gallery of Pavlovsk has twelve landscape paintings by Hubert Robert that were commissioned by Maria Feodorovna. Cameron laid out a triple alley of five straight rows of Linden trees, imported from Lübeck, in a long axis from the courtyard of the Palace, leading to a small semi-circular place in the forest. This served as a parade ground for Emperor Pavel's Imperial guards. In the forest to the left of this axis he placed a romantic thatch-roofed dairy with stalls for two cows modeled after the one in the park of Württemberg where Maria Feodorovna had grown up; and on the other side of the parade route, an aviary, filled with parakeets, nightingales, starlings, and quail. This part of the garden also included a labyrinth, and picturesque tombstones imported from Italy. An early French visitor described the effect of this part of the garden: "Melancholy consumes the soul when you arrive...then the pain is followed by pleasure."

Marie Feodorovna was deeply interested in botany. In 1801, Cameron constructed an elegant flower garden behind the Palace, just outside the windows of the private apartment of Marie Feodorovna. Next to the garden was a Greek temple containing a statue of the Three Graces, looking down at the river. She imported flowers from Holland for her garden, including hyacinth, tulips, daffodils and narcissus. She also constructed an orangery and several greenhouses where she grew apricots, cherries, peaches, grapes and pineapples. The River Slavyanovka was the picturesque axis of the composition, with winding paths along the river providing changing views to the visitor. A dam turned the river into a picturesque pond in the valley below the Palace. In 1780, Cameron constructed a large Roman temple at a turn in the river in the bottom of the valley. The classical temple, similar to the Temple of Pan in the gardens at Stowe House in England. It was originally called the Temple of Gratitude, dedicated to Catherine the Great, who had donated the land for the Park, but in 1780 it was renamed the Temple of Friendship, in honor of the visit to Pavlovsk of Joseph II, Holy Roman Emperor.

Between 1780 and 1783, at the top of the hill which descended to the lake, Cameron constructed a colonnade with a copy of the Apollo Belvedere in Rome. By the early 19th century, the park at Pavlovsk had gardens representing many different styles. A formal and geometric garden à la française was planted near the Palace. An Italian garden, with parterres, classical statues and a grand staircase was created by Brenna on the hillside overlooking the lake. Cameron used the intimate Dutch style for the little private garden outside Maria Feodorovna's private apartments, and the huge park was in the style of the English and French landscape garden. An English visitor, John Lowden, who saw Pavlovsk during the war against Napoleon in 1812, wrote that Pavlovsk Park was the most beautiful example of the English landscape garden in all of the Russian Empire.

Beginning in 1792, the chief architect of the Pavlovsk Park was the Italian landscape architect and painter, Pietro Gonzaga, who had begun his career as a set designer at the La Scala Theater in Milan. Gonzaga always remained a theater designer; he designed the funeral procession of Catherine the Great, Paul I, and Alexander I. as well as the Coronations of Paul I, Alexander I and Nicholas I. For Cameron he painted landscape scenes of the Pavlovsk Park on the walls and ceilings of rooms of the Palace, and he designed spectacular sets for the 1814 ceremony at Pavlovsk welcoming Alexander I home after his victory over Napoleon.

Gonzaga planned the landscape of Pavlovsk Park with meticulous care, marking the trees to be saved or cut down. He laid out paths and changed contours to create the effects he wanted, using open and closed spaces and different colors and shapes of trees to make theatrical scenes. He made dramatic use of the contrast between the white bark and light leaves of birch trees and the dark needles of red-brown trunks of pine trees, setting groups of birch trees in front of dark backgrounds of pines. He made decorative use of the different seasons in the park, painting scenes with brilliant colors of the autumn leaves. Gonzaga was the architect of Pavlovsk Park until his death in 1831 at the age of eighty.

== Gonzago Gallery ==
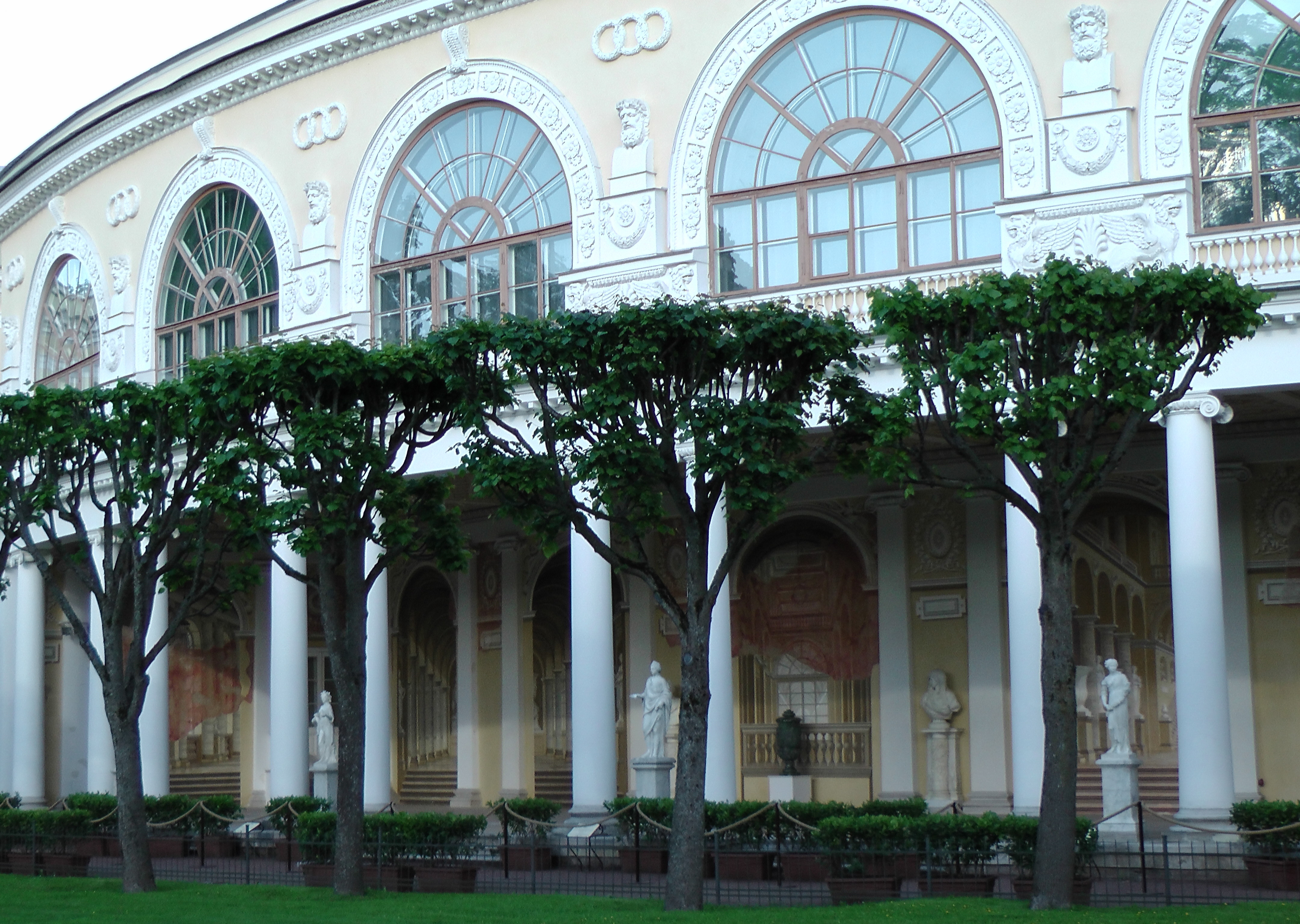
Gonzago Gallery

The Gonzago Gallery is a unique architectural and fresco ensemble in the Pavlovsk Palace, created by the Italian decorator, architect and art theorist Pietro di Gottardo Gonzago in the early 19th century. It is the only example in Northern Europe of an exterior fresco painting of such a large area: 350 square metres for the wall and 200 square metres for the ceiling.

The gallery was built in 1795-1797 by the architect Vincenzo Brenna as a summer outdoor dining room for the palace's inhabitants. The painting of the Gallery, created by Pietro di Gotthardo Gonzago, was carried out on behalf of Empress Maria Feodorovna much later. The work was carried out in 1805–1807.

It is believed that Gonzago previously made a drawing on the wet plaster method graffiti, and then worked on the plaster that has not yet dried up in the technique of grisaille red paint based on iron oxide pigment. When the plaster had dried, the artist elaborated and modelled the form with lime-based paints.

In 1822-1824 the architect Carlo Rossi built a library over the Gallery with large arched windows framed with rosettes ornaments. Because of the construction of the library, Gonzago's assistant had to redo the ceiling of the Gallery in 1824. Rossi placed busts of ancient writers and philosophers between the windows, with stucco wreaths above them. In the 19th-century updates of the paintings in the Gallery were made.

During the Soviet era, a museum-reserve was established based on the Pavlovsky Palace. In the 1930s, the Gallery was used as a canteen at a children's health camp.

During World War II, the frescoes were seriously damaged. The difficult process of restoration of the Gonzago Gallery was only completed in 2011.

== See also ==
- 18th-century Western domes

== Bibliography ==
- Orloff, Alexandre and Chvidkovski, Dimitri, Saint-Petersbourg- l'architecture des tsars, Editions Place des Victoires, Paris 1995, translated from Russian to French by Brigitte de Monclos, ISBN 2-84459-025-X
- Massie, Suzanne, Pavlovsk: The Life of a Russian Palace, Hodder & Stoughton, 1990; ISBN 0-340-48790-9.

== Gallery of Pavlovsk Palace and Park ==
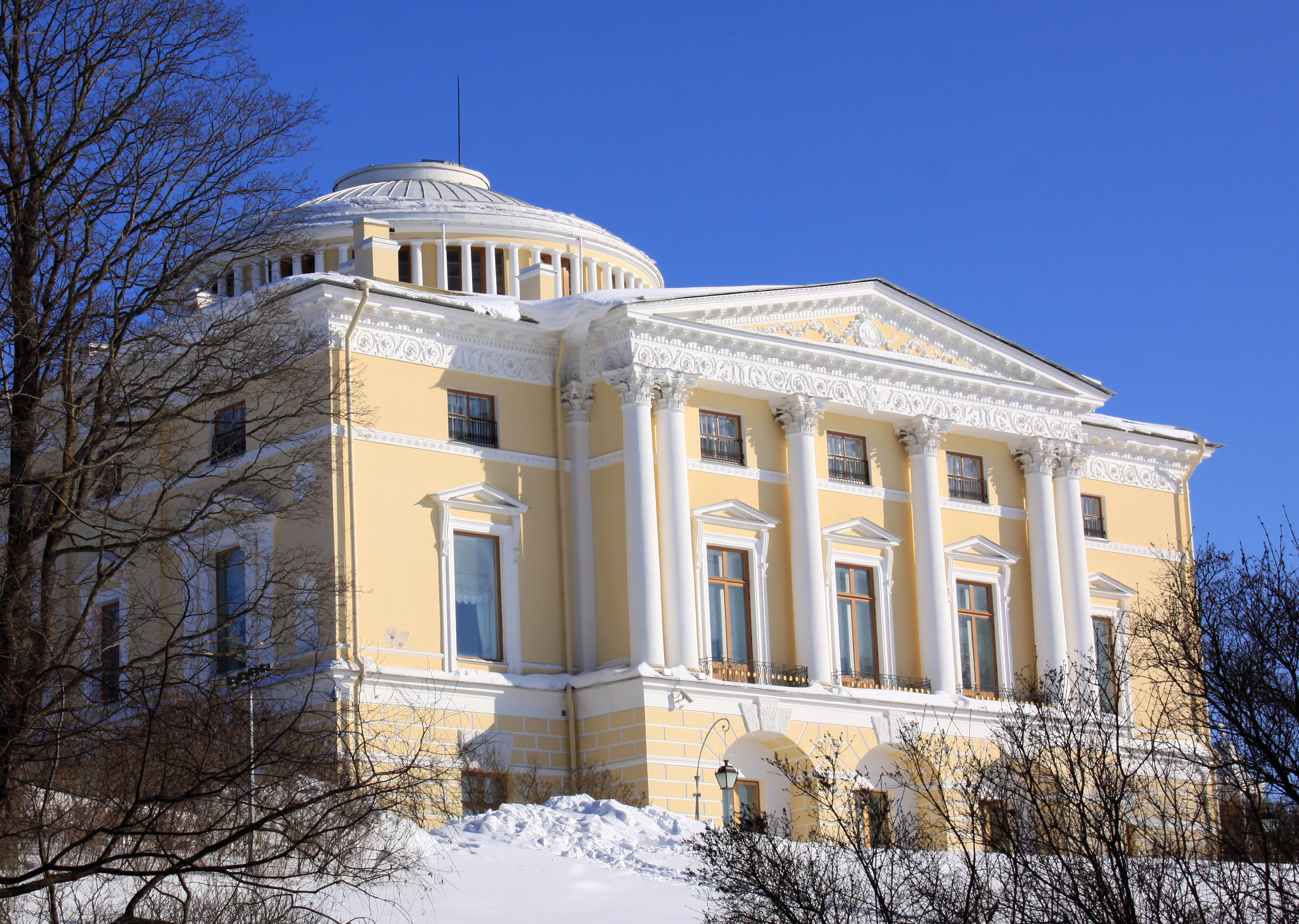
Pavlovsk Palace

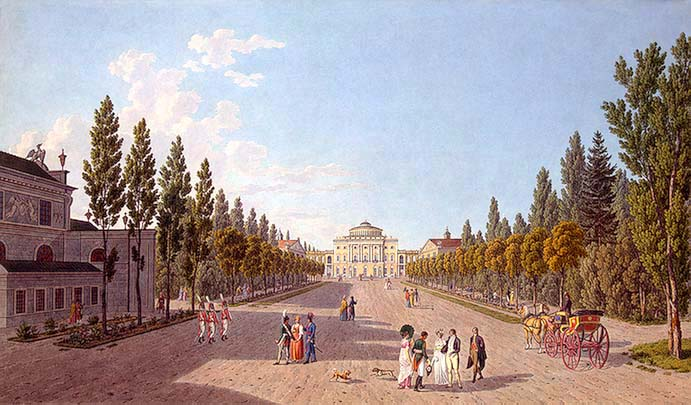
Approach to Pavlovsk Palace (1808)

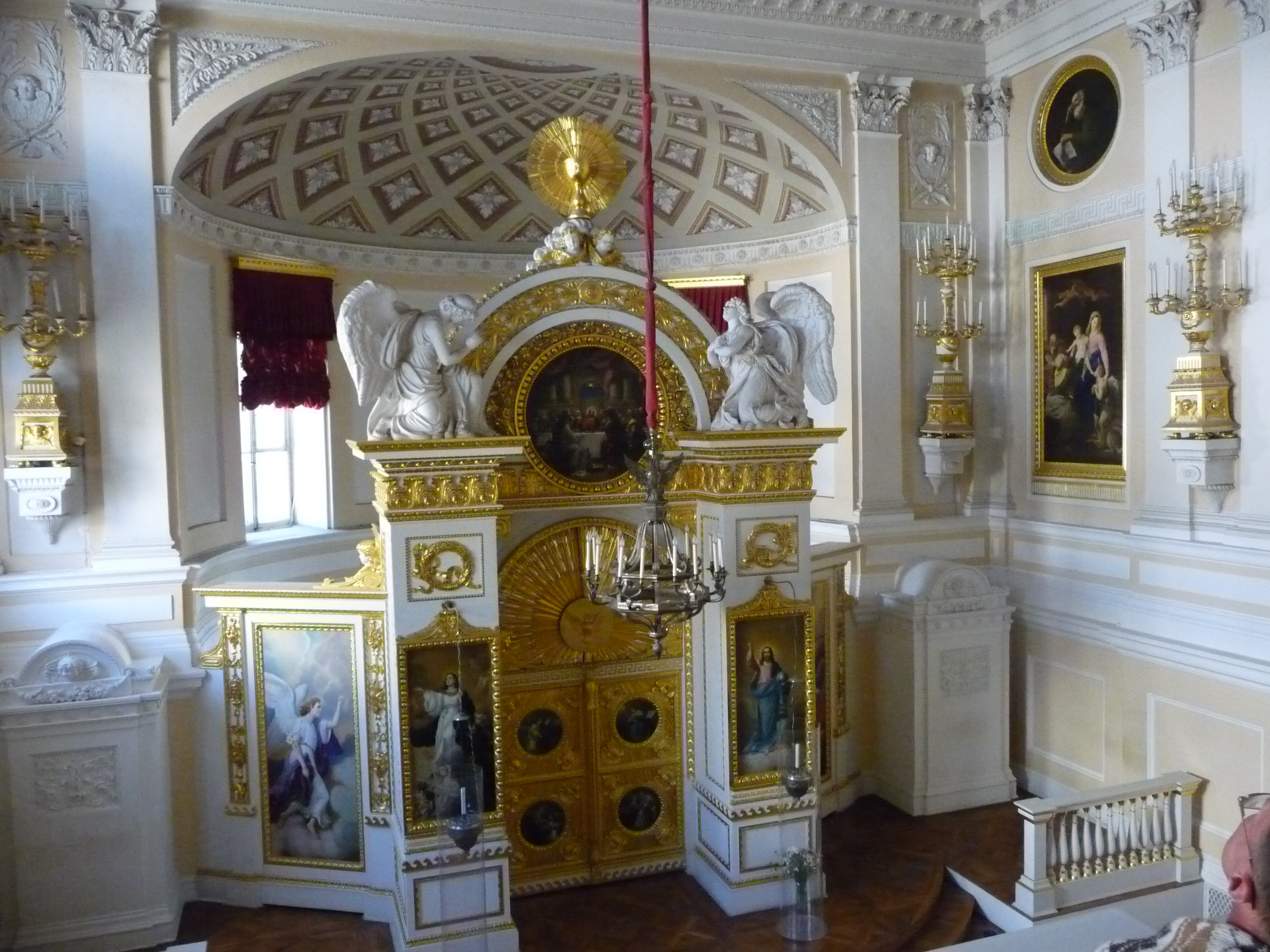
The chapel of Pavlovsk Palace

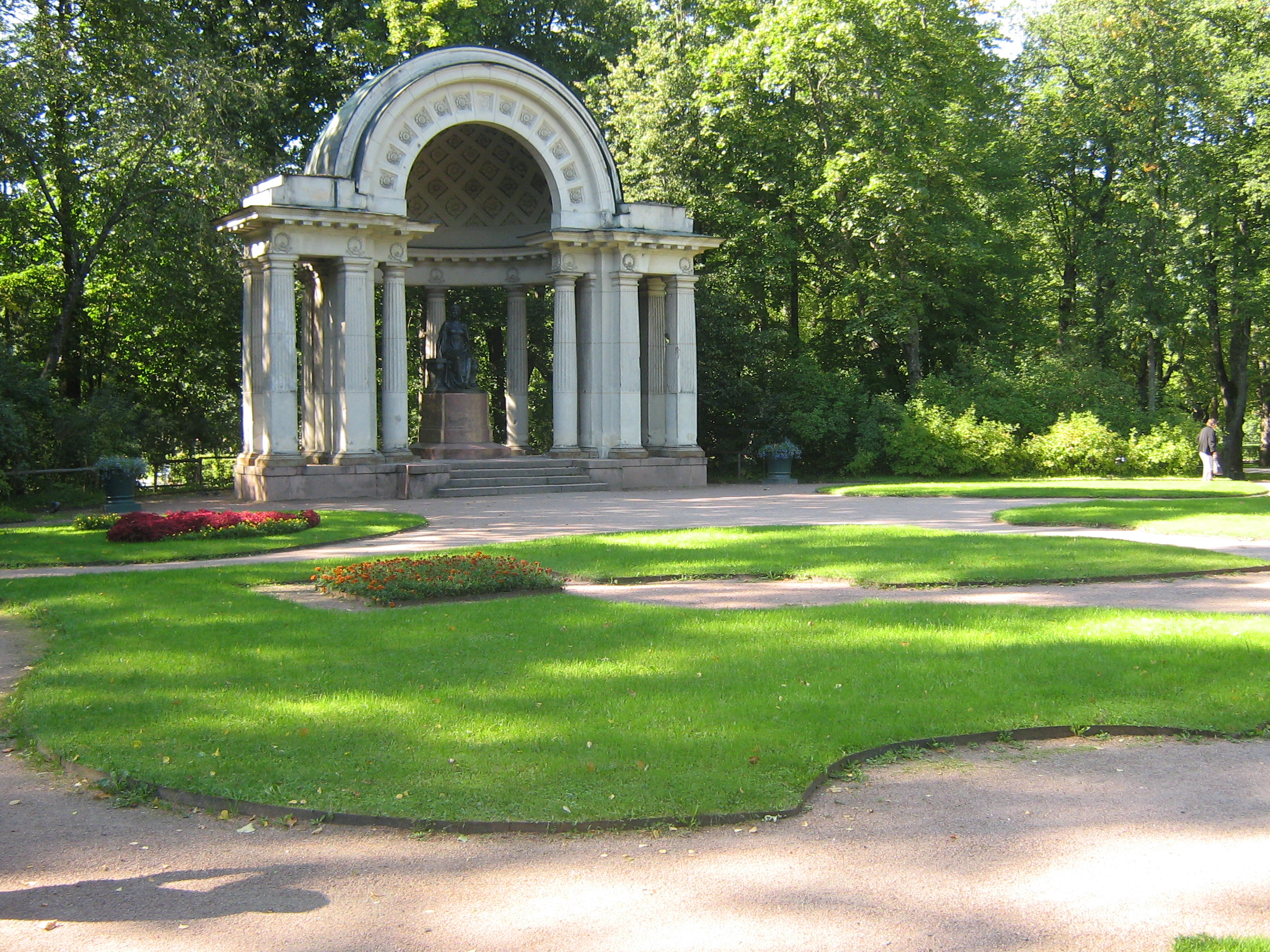
The Rossi Pavilion in Pavlovsk Park

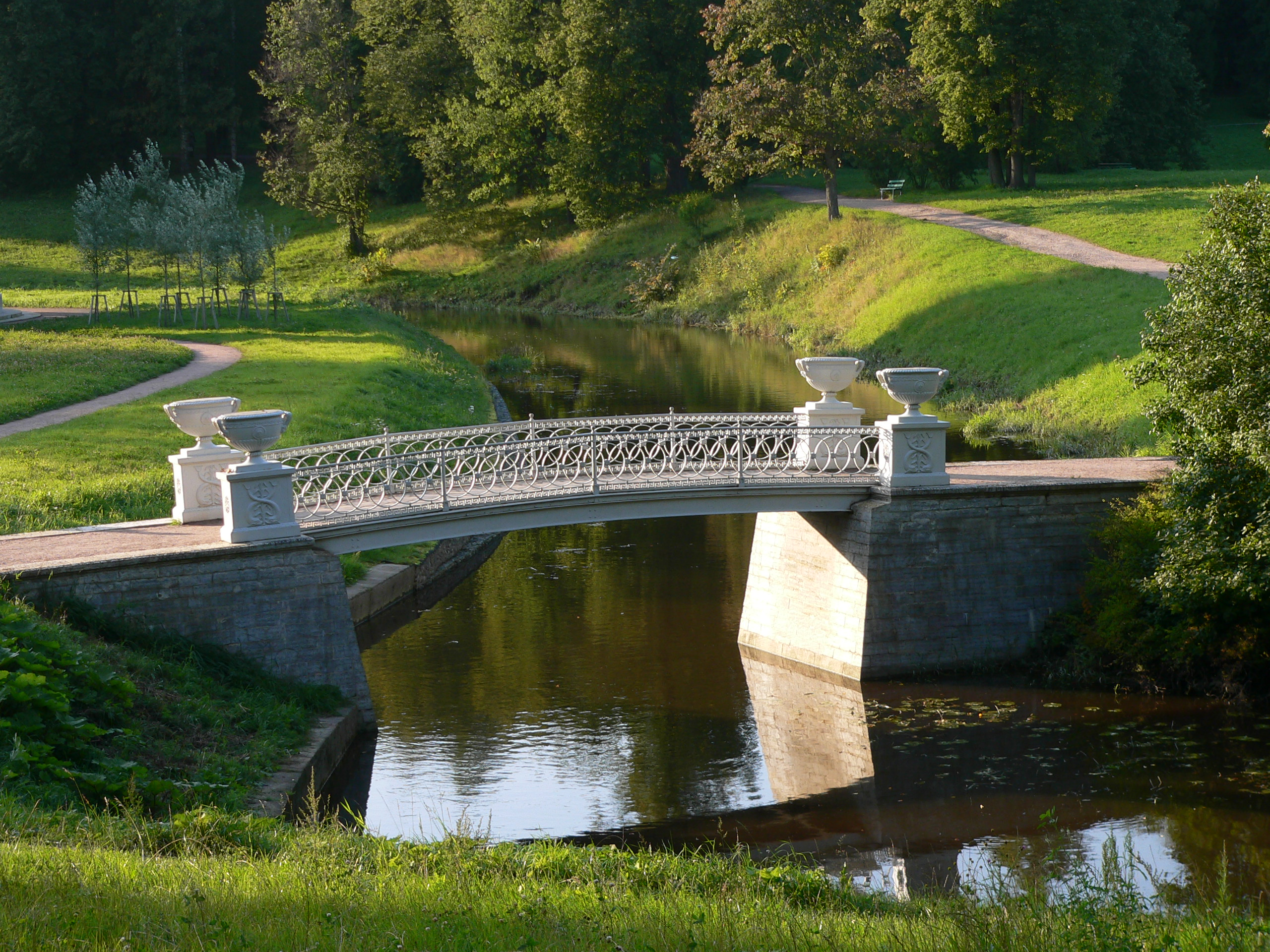
The cast iron bridge in Pavlovsk Park

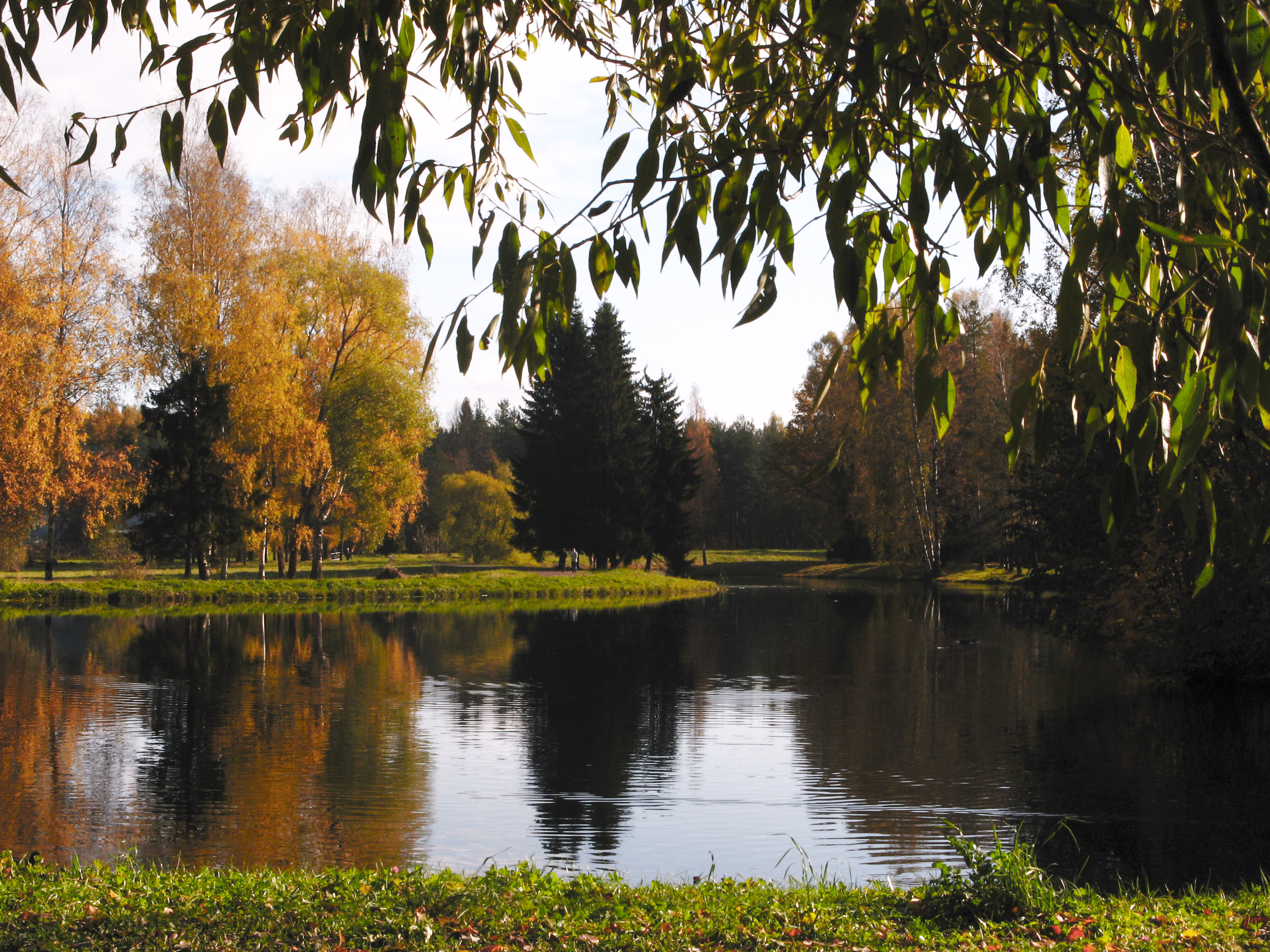
The Slavyanka River in Pavlovsk Park in autumn
