= Vincenzo Brenna =

Italian architect and painter (1747–1820)

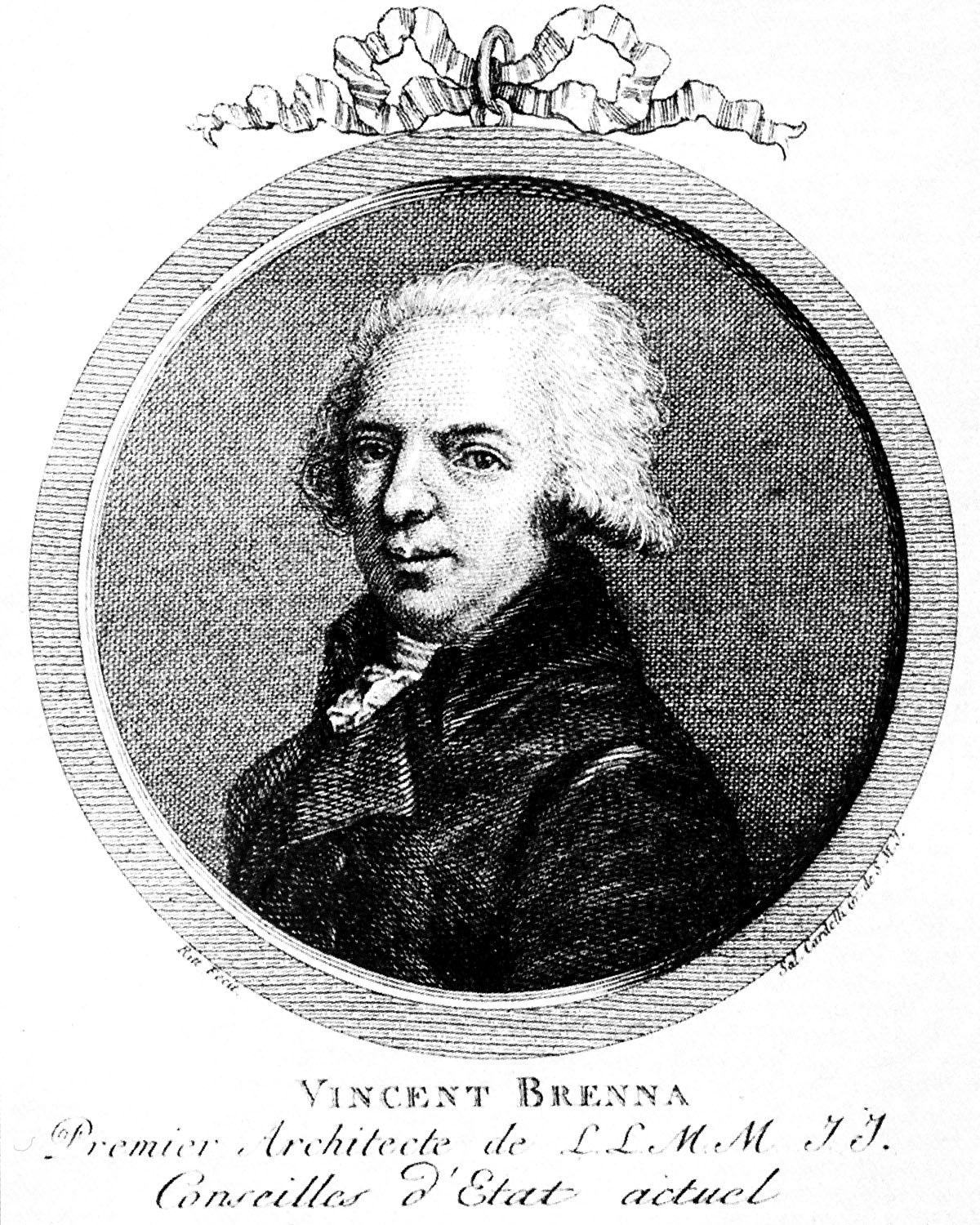
- Engraving by Cardelli, around 1800
- Born: 20 August 1747; Rome
- Died: 17 May 1820; Dresden
- Education: School of Stefano Pozzi
- Occupation: Architect
- Buildings: Saint Michael's Castle
- Projects: Gatchina and Pavlovsk Palace

Vincenzo Brenna (August 20, 1747 – May 17, 1820) was an Italian architect and painter who was the house architect of Paul I of Russia. Brenna was hired by Paul and his spouse Maria Fyodorovna as interior decorator in 1781 and by the end of 1780s became the couple's leading architect. Brenna worked on Pavlovsk Palace and Gatchina palaces, rebuilt Saint Isaac's Cathedral, and most notably created Saint Michael's Castle in Saint Petersburg. Most of his architectural works were created concurrently during Paul's brief reign (November 1796 – March 1801). Soon after Paul was murdered in a palace coup Brenna, renowned for fraud and embezzlement barely tolerated by his late patron, retired and left Russia for an uneventful life in Saxony.

Brenna never reached the level of his better known contemporaries Giacomo Quarenghi, Charles Cameron and Vasili Bazhenov and was soon surpassed by his own trainee Carlo Rossi. Nevertheless, historians Igor Grabar, Nikolay Lanceray and Dmitry Shvidkovsky praised him for sincere and unrestricted naturalism of his graphic work and considered him to be the watershed between the Age of Enlightenment and Romanticism in Russian architecture.

== Family roots and training ==
Brenna belonged to an old Ticino family that had split into two branches, stonemasons (Brenno) and painters (Brenni) not later than the last quarter of the 17th century. Stonemasons and marbling experts Karl Antonio and Francesco Brenno worked in the 1680s in Salzburg. Karl Enrico Brenno (Brennus) carved elaborate tombs in Denmark and Hamburg, but was better known for his marbling artwork at Fredensborg, Christiansborg and Klausholm palaces. Giovanni Battista Brenno, stucco expert, worked in Bavaria. The other branch produced three brothers Brenni (born in the 1730s), fresco painters. Vincenzo Brenna, son of Francesco, was born in 1747 in Florence (19th-century sources list him as a native of Rome, perhaps due to his signature Del cavalier Brenna Romano). It is not clear whether Vincenzo Brenna belonged to Brenno or Brenni branch.

Since 1767 Brenna studied crafts in the Roman workshop of Stefano Pozzi together with his better known contemporary Giacomo Quarenghi. Quarenghi, who leaned to painting, converted to architecture under Brenna's influence and later even gave Brenna, who was three years younger than Quarenghi the credit for being "my first teacher in architecture". Brenna himself did not have luck in tangible architecture; instead, commissioned by Lodovico Mirri under auspices of Pope Clement XIII, he surveyed the relics of Rome together with Franciszek Smuglewicz. Their drawings, engraved by Marco Carloni, were published in the late 1770s as Vestigia delle Terme di Tito. Another set of Brenna's drawings, created not later than 1781 and engraved by Giovanni Cassini, was published in three folios (380 sheets) from 1781 to 1788. It is not known if Brenna had a chance to meet Charles Cameron, who also surveyed Rome in the 1770s, prior to Brenna's arrival in Russia. Brenna eventually "arrived at a more theatric conception of Antiquity than the Scot," and created architecture radically different from Cameron's.

== From Poland to Russia ==
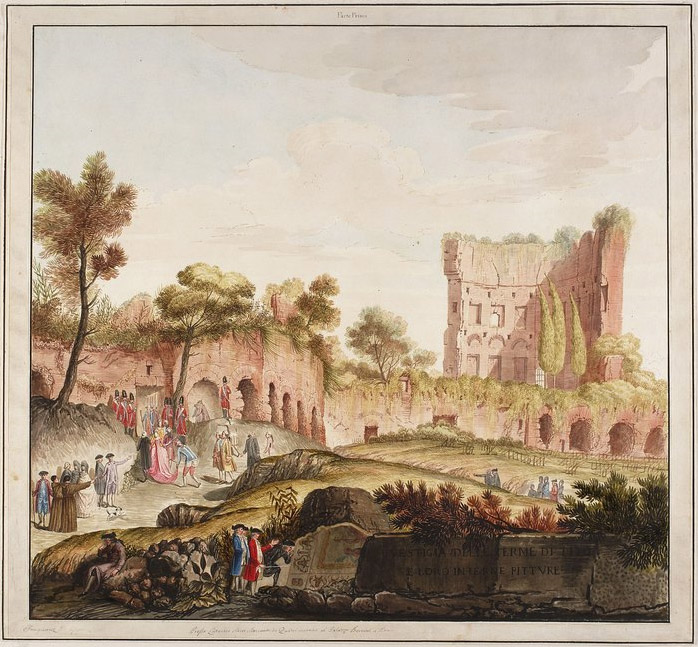
Baths of Titus from Vestigia delle Terme di Tito by Smuglewicz, Brenna and Carloni

Back in Italy Brenna met Stanisław Kostka Potocki, a well-educated and rich amateur in need of professional artists. Brenna followed Potocki to Poland where he prepared two drafts of a church in Ujazdow. He received commissions to decorate Potocki's palace in Natolin, for which "compensated" himself from his patron's art collection. The two parted in a bitter conflict; "Brenna's thievery, double-dealing and desertion of his benefactor Potocki for the future czar seem the unkindest cuts of all". According to Lanceray, Brenna also painted frescoes in Warsaw for the king Stanisław August Poniatowski.

In the end of 1781 Russian heir apparent Paul (reigned as Paul I of Russia) and his spouse Maria, travelling on a Grand Tour of Europe under the thin guise of Comte du Nord, noticed Brenna's work in Warsaw. Paul, aware that Charles Cameron needed interior decorators for his Pavlovsk palace, offered Brenna employment in Pavlovsk. Brenna and his assistant Franz Labensky were formally hired by Maria for a starting annual salary of 200 roubles. Most recent sources (Shvidkovsky) date Brenna's arrival in Russia as the beginning of 1784; Lanceray described Brenna's Russian drafts dated 1783.

Meanwhile, when Paul and Maria were in Europe, Cameron began displaying signs of aversion to their interference with his work. Court intermediaries suppressed the conflict for a while, but by 1785 Maria herself grew tired of Cameron's alleged inefficiency and warned him, through Count Kuchelbecker, that he will not see any new commissions. Cameron's influence faded, influence of his assistants, including Brenna, rose, powered in part by the Italians' assertive, self-confident behaviour. Aspiring Brenna was caught in the middle of "battle of the palaces", an expensive ideological contest between Catherine and Paul "hidden from the uninitiated but known to the court". Catherine made the first move, razing Bazhenov's gothic towers of Tsaritsyno Palace. Cameron, dismissed by Paul, was the second casualty. Paul suspected him of carrying out Catherine's orders: Cameron built for him "a markedly private world", not an imperial palace. Brenna, already Paul's trusted servant, was an ideal replacement. According to Lanceray, Paul used Brenna for visualizing his architectural fantasies as early as 1783–1785. Maria also favored Brenna; in 1787 she wrote that she was "fascinated by Brenna's return to work" inherited from Cameron.

By 1789 (Shvidkovsky: 1786) Brenna, finally, was awarded his first tangible architectural project, remodeling of Paul's study suite in Pavlovsk. In 1794 Brenna was rewarded with a lot of land near to Pavlovsk palace. Paul's trusted barber Count Ivan Kutaisov, another Pavlovsk landlord, became Brenna's first private customer; he commissioned a summer dacha in "medieval style". By this time Brenna earned 750 roubles p.a., but when Paul ascended to the throne in 1796, Brenna's salary reached 3,550 roubles.

== Gatchina ==
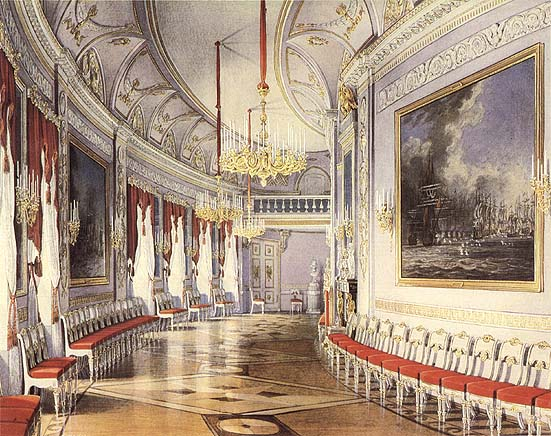
Interiors of Gatchina Palace in 1877

Gatchina Palace, completed by Antonio Rinaldi in 1781, became Paul's residence in 1783; formally, it was his property and Pavlovsk became property of Maria Fyodorovna. Paul associated Rinaldi's style with Orlov brothers, murderers of his fathers, and immediately launched remodeling of the palace. Paul and Maria's private suites were redesigned in austere styling with inexpensive materials, in contrast with lavishly decorated public halls. Until 1790 Paul lived a quiet life of a landlord, but in the last six years of Catherine's reign (1790–1796) Gatchina became a base for Paul's private militarized party, called Gatchintsy or Ostrogoths.

In 1793 Brenna designed Connetable Square, modelled after Château de Chantilly. In 1796 Paul launched construction of a military base for his trusted Gatchina troops; the project, led by Brenna, also employed Bazhenov, Ivan Starov, Andreyan Zakharov and Nikolay Lvov, architect of the Priory Palace. At about the same time Brenna expanded the palace itself, completing two square side wings of the palace. According to Lanceray's studies of archived architectural drawings, initially Paul instructed Brenna to design these wings as single-story buildings, then two storey, and finally three storey, level with Rinaldi's central core. Archive evidence does not allow reliable attribution of other Gatchina buildings to Brenna; after Paul's ascension he retained overall management over Gatchina project, but spent most time working on Saint Michael's Castle.

Brenna also completed a series of new, at time fantastic, palace drafts reflecting Paul's visions. Some of these drafts, dated 1783–1785, are direct predecessors of Saint Michael's Castle; according to Lanceray, these early experiments explain the "mind-bogging fast" (Russian: умопомрачительно быстро) pace of design stage for the Castle.

== Pavlovsk ==
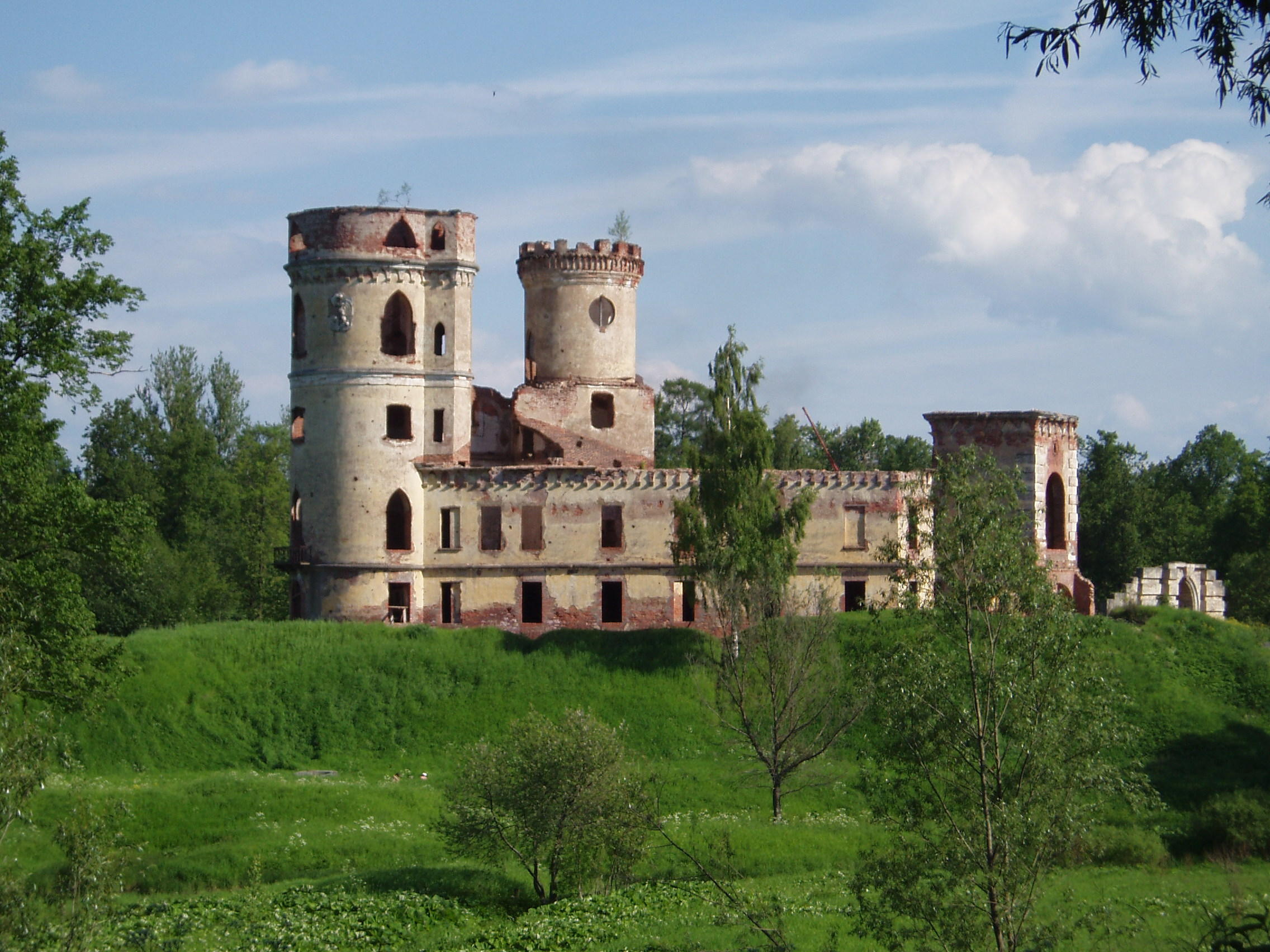
Ruins of Bip Fortress (Paul's folly) in Pavlovsk

Brenna's major additions to Pavlovsk Palace materialized after Paul's ascension to the throne; the architect prepared drafts over the winter of 1796-1797 and work commenced in spring of 1797. By summer of 1799 Brenna completed expansion of Cameron's modest side wings into spacious private suites for Paul and Maria, and added new wings for their retinue, nearly completing the circumference of oval cour d'honneur. However, the palace retained its open facade appearance and the circumference is evident only in plans or aerial photographs. Pavlovsk interiors retained, to a varying degree, signs of Cameron's style and cannot be reliably attributed to a particular architect, with the exception of empress Maria's suite unconditionally attributed to Brenna and Andrey Voronikhin's repairs after the 1803 fire.

Bip Fortress, built on site of actual Swedish forts of Great Northern War, was Paul's favorite folly since 1778. Paul even listed Bip as a real fortress in the official Army register. Existing structure was completed by Brenna in 1797 and housed Maltese Order offices.

Brenna also designed and built Pavlovsk residence for grand dukes Alexander and Konstantin. Completed in December 1798, it was originally intended for empress Maria's mother and eventually became Konstantin's private residence. All of Brenna's original styling was lost in the 19th century.

== Saint Michael's Castle ==
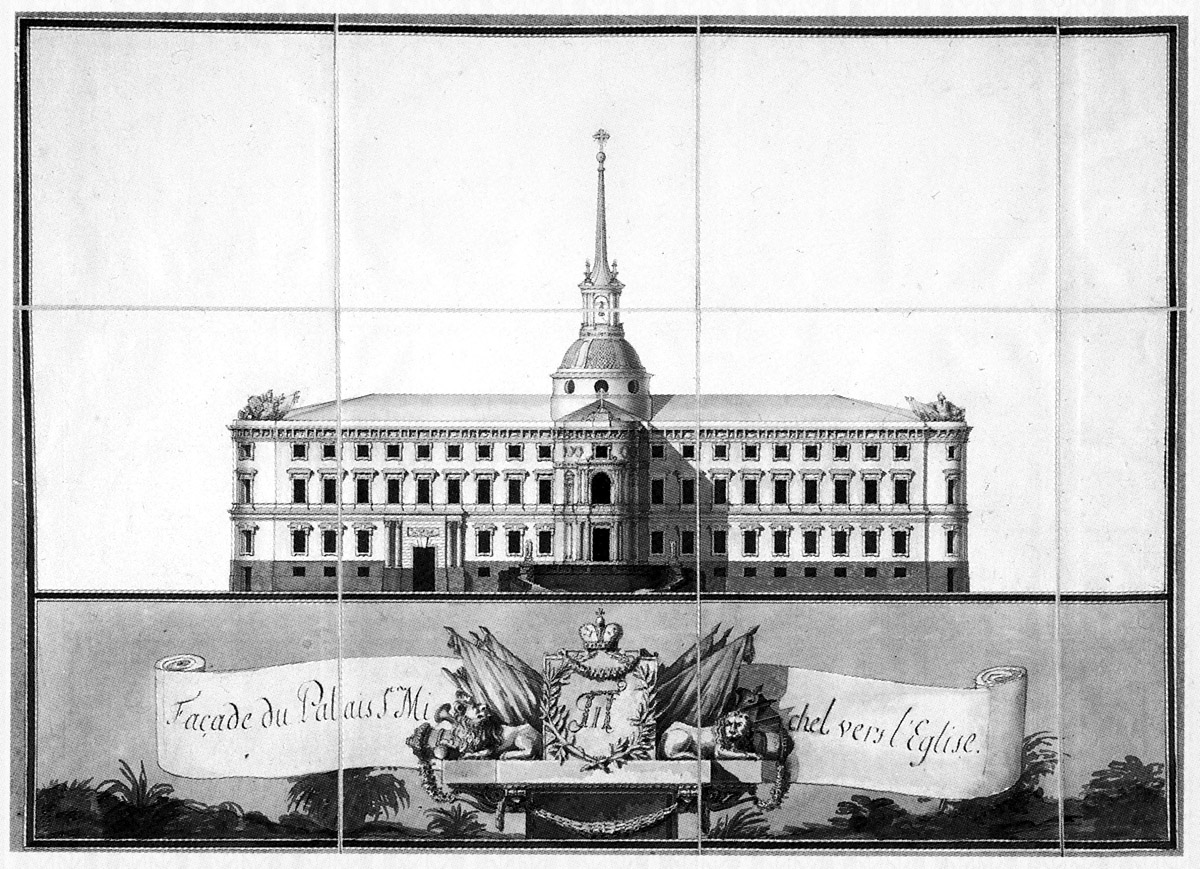
Brenna's original 1797 drawing

In May 1782 Paul, Comte du Nord, met Charles-Louis Clérisseau in Chantilly. Clerisseau, who knew he was admired by Paul's mother, reprimanded the Russian heir for not paying him attention before and promised to report Paul's "disrespect" to Catherine. The bitter exchange further alienated Paul from the Enlightenment Classicism practiced by Catherine; Paul formed an opinion of neoclassic art as dry, emotionally inadequate reproduction of antiques. Instead of André Le Nôtre's geometric gardens, Paul embraced emerging romanticism and the English concept of landscape parks. According to Dmitry Shvidkovsky, the architect and the emperor shared the Romantic vision of art; this emotional bond explains Brenna's survival at the court of an irrational tsar.

Design and construction of Saint Michael's Castle began at least 13 times since 1784; in the end, Paul relied on Brenna and his trainee Carlo Rossi. Vasily Bazhenov was involved in one of earlier abortive projects; this information, incorrectly interpreted in the 19th century, led to a widespread misconception that the castle was co-designed by Brenna and Bazhenov. Paul, in his usual manner, assigned Bazhenov to be Brenna's mentor, but all creative and business issues were handled by Brenna alone. The castle turned out to be not a Neoclassical building, but "a rare example of an imperial palace genuinely redolent of the Romantic era."

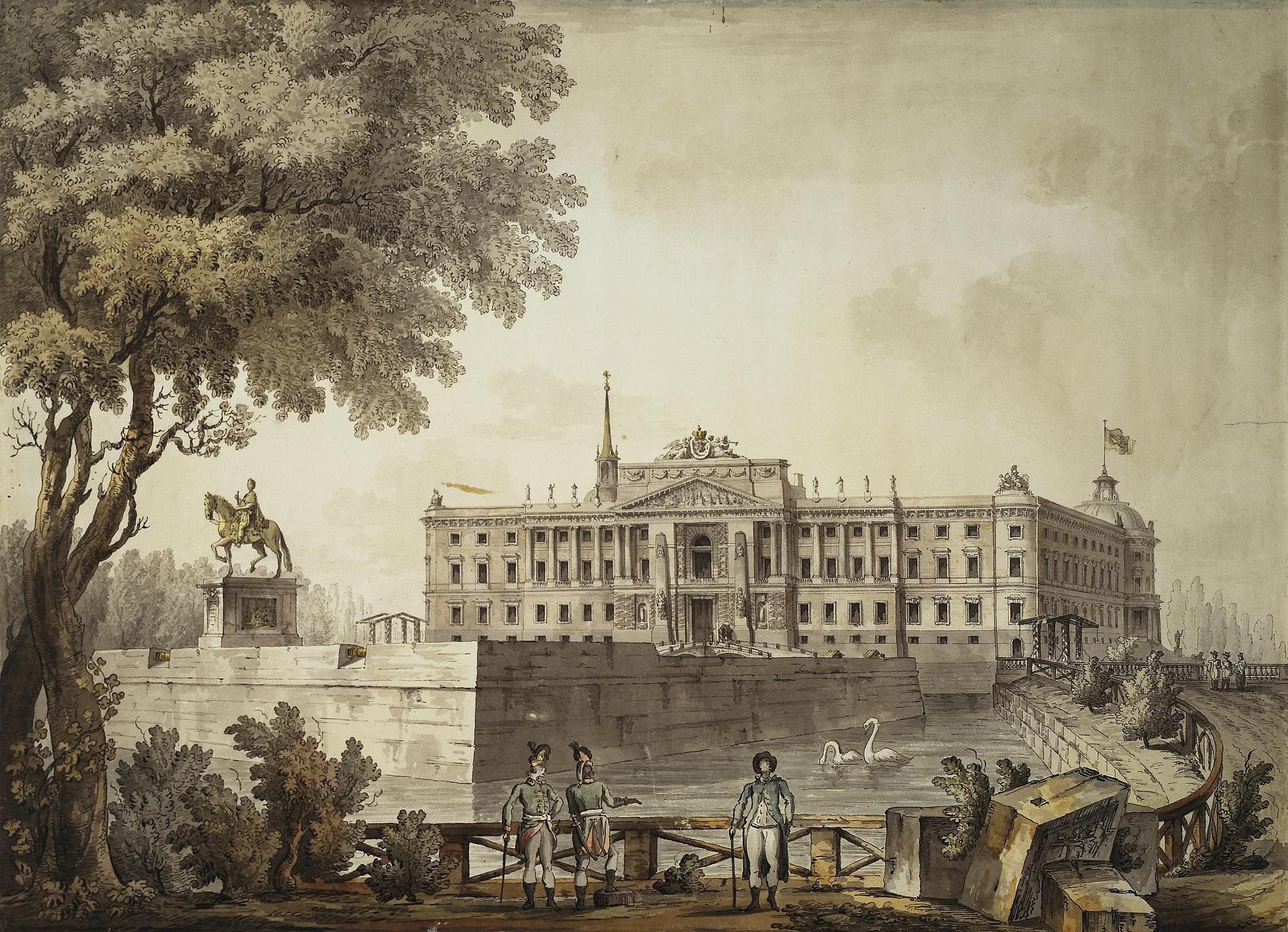
View in 1801. Watercolor by Giacomo Quarenghi

Paul decreed construction of the castle in November 1796, three weeks after Catherine's death. It took two months to demolish the old structures on site; groundbreaking was celebrated in February 1797 but actual work commenced in earnest on March 11, exactly four years before Paul's murder. Initial cost budget reached 1.5 million roubles in gold, not including interior finishes

Paul shut down Catherine's projects in Tsarskoye Selo and placed the redundant workforce at Brenna's disposal. He wanted to see the castle externally complete by the end of 1797, so work on site, employing up to 6,000 men, continued day at night while all other residents of Saint Petersburg were ordered to sleep after dusk. Indeed, walls of the castle and nearby Exerzierhaus (Riding House) were built (but not finished in stone) by the end of October 1797. Brenna, realizing that existing project management controls will delay completion, demanded elimination of all financial controls and intermediaries between Paul and himself. Paul agreed and allowed Brenna unchecked access to state finances; in the end, total cost of the Castle reached six million roubles in gold.

While Paul and Brenna spent millions on finishes and artwork, they placed unnecessary cost controls on essential works like roofing and site drainage; the castle was topped out with an iron roof only in 1799. The structure was declared ready for occupancy only in the beginning of 1800, fourteen months before Paul's death, but "moving in" ceremony was delayed until November 1800. Moisture inside the ballroom was so high that candlelight could not break through the wall of fog; Paul and Maria left and returned to the castle only on February 1, 1801.

Despite all setbacks, four-year construction period was unprecedented for a large palace; contemporaries and modern historians agree that Brenna proved himself a capable project manager. In addition to Saint Michael's Castle, he was still responsible for works performed at Gatchina, Pavlovsk, Petergof and Tsarskoye Selo; he managed hundreds of suppliers and contractors, hired European artists, squeezed discounts out of merchants, arranged geological expedition scouting for proper granite deposits. Unlike Cameron, Brenna never hesitated to assign less-than-competent artists to "fill the void" and make the schedule; he focused on the whole picture and did not seek perfection in detail.

== Private life and retirement ==
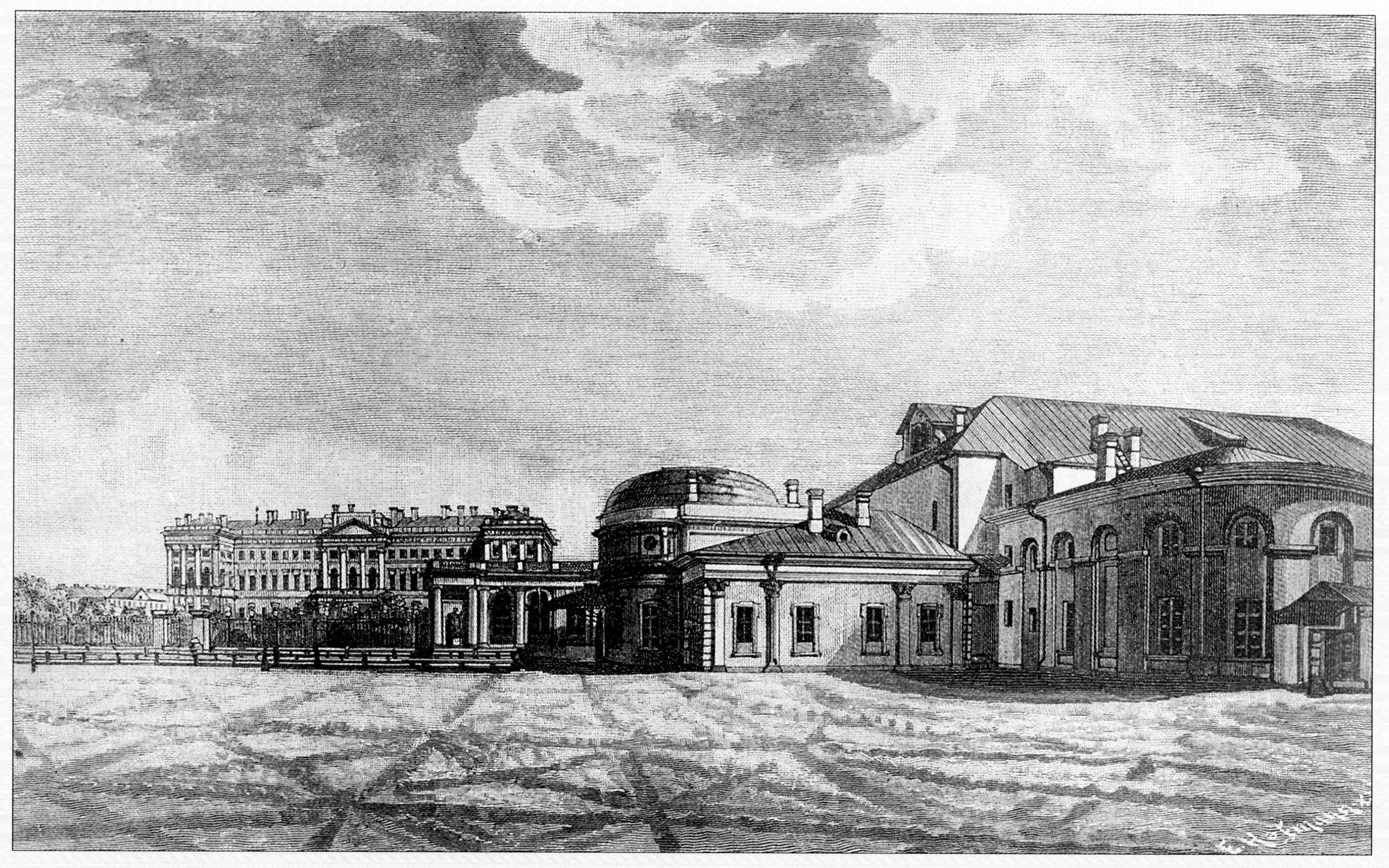
Antonio Casassi Theatre, Brenna's last building, stood on site of present-day Alexandrinsky Theatre

Little is known of Brenna's private life or even his personal appearance. The sole existing portrait of Brenna as a middle-aged man bears certain resemblance to images of Paul I, perhaps a deliberate flattery. Another idealistic image of Brenna was painted in the plafond of Saint Michael's Castle by a mediocre assistant who used the same model for cupids and statesmen.

Brenna married Maria Trauenfeld, whose father was employed by Frederick Eugene, father of empress Maria. Exact date of the marriage is unknown; it probably took place soon after Brenna's arrival in Russia. They had a daughter, who was around sixteen in 1798, and whose later life remains unknown (her name did not appear on the immigration records when Brennas left). The Brennas maintained modest lifestyle in Pavlovsk and Gatchina until Brenna relocated to Saint Petersburg in 1796. In 1798 they moved to former Trauenfeld residence; Brenna purchased this building one month prior to Paul's murder.

Brenna, as chief procurer of arts to Paul's court, amassed a remarkable collection of arts, including works by Michelangelo, Rembrandt and Titian. Brenna's unscrupulous handling of state treasury irreparably tarnished his reputation. Paul himself was aware of Brenna's misconduct and was credited with a pun, in French language: "Voila l'architecte qui vole" (voler can be interpreted as soar as well as steal). Vladimir Stasov accused Brenna of physically stealing art from the Hermitage collection.

Brenna's last building in Saint Petersburg was a wooden theatre commissioned by Antonio Casassi in 1801; in 1832 Carlo Rossi replaced it with present-day Alexandrinsky Theatre building. Murder of Paul (March 11, 1801) and ascension of Alexander I of Russia spelled end of Brenna's career; he was not even invited to decorate the funeral ceremonies. Alexander clearly preferred the art of Quarenghi and Andrey Voronikhin. The family council decided to leave Russia for Saxony; other Italians (Concensio Albani, Antonio Rusca, Giuseppe Sarti) followed, for different reasons. Brenna's wife, father in law and some of his apprentices left in May 1802.

Brenna stayed in Saint Petersburg to settle his finances. He sold his art treasures and in January 1802 tended his resignation to Maria Fyodorovna, the latter granted him annual pension of 3525 roubles (half of his salary). Brenna also applied to Alexander for a raise, and was harshly shown to the door; his pension, awarded on assumption that Brenna would stay in Russia and be available for professional consultancy, was reduced to 2,000 roubles. In August 1802 Brenna left Saint Petersburg for Dresden, accompanied by faithful Rossi.

Brenna did no further work as a practical architect. Russian travelers who visited him after the end of Napoleonic Wars noted apparent mediocrity of his works of this period. Sculptor Samuil Galberg wrote, "Wicked old man! He is not aware how poor his paintings are". After Brenna's death in Dresden in 1820 his widow pleaded Russian foreign minister Karl Nesselrode for assistance, but Nesselrode reasoned that she retained at least some of Brenna's fortune made in Russia, and denied help.

== Critical assessment ==
Historians agree that Brenna's talent was nowhere near that of his illustrious rivals (Bazhenov, Cameron, Quarenghi) or his trainee, Carlo Rossi. Degree of Brenna's talent or mediocrity was debated.

Igor Grabar praised Brenna for an extreme degree of naturalism in his artwork and considered Brenna to be the watershed between naturalism of the 18th century and stylization of Empire style. Nikolay Lanceray, who wrote a biography of Brenna in 1935–1938, called Brenna "the last spark of 18th century art" and noted that his naturalism resurfaced in the middle of the 19th century, but the eclectic architects of this period failed in reproducing Brenna's wholesome realism; only Rossi managed to combine the virtues of Brenna and Quarenghi. Lanceray noted Brenna's weakness in floorplan designs, labeling them "helpless and primitive", and praised him for nearly perfect facades of Saint Michael's Castle.

Dmitry Shvidkovsky elaborated on the "watershed" theory, linking Brenna's art to his Roman studies: "No partisan of strict Antiquity like Cameron, he was able to combine the solemn image of Imperial Rome with heightened pre-Romantic emotionalism. Time almost seems sublimated in his work in Russia because of the impact of an imperial patron who wanted a complete break with Catherinian tradition... Paul was the first emperor of the Romantic era, Brenna was the precursor of Romantic Neoclassicism."

== Brenna in fiction ==
Brenna, played by Alexander Grigoryants, appears in the 2003 Russian film Poor, Poor Pavel featuring Viktor Sukhorukov as Paul and late Oleg Yankovsky as Count Pahlen. The film is loosely based on a 1908 play Pavel I by Dmitry Merezhkovsky.

In the film, Brenna is portrayed far younger than he actually was during Paul's reign, and bears no resemblance to the real Brenna's portrait. His calls for "more gold!" reflect real Brenna's generous use of gold paint, although the film omits the topic of Brenna's embezzlement.

== Sources ==
- Du Prey, Pierre de la Ruffinière (1994). The villas of Pliny from antiquity to posterity. University of Chicago Press. ISBN 978-0-226-17300-9.
- Lanceray, Nikolay (2006). Vincenzo Brenna (Винченцо Бренна) (in Russian). Saint Petersburg: Kolo. ISBN 5-901841-34-4. Note: the book was written in 1935–1938 and first printed in 2006.
- Fejfer, Jane; et al. (2003). The rediscovery of antiquity: the role of the artist. Museum Tusculanum Press. ISBN 978-87-7289-829-2.
- Shvidkovsky, D. S. (2007). Russian architecture and the West. Yale University Press. ISBN 978-0-300-10912-2.
