= Connetable (Gatchina) =

Obelisk and square in Gatchina, Russia

Coordinates: 59°33′36.3″N 30°6′47.1″E

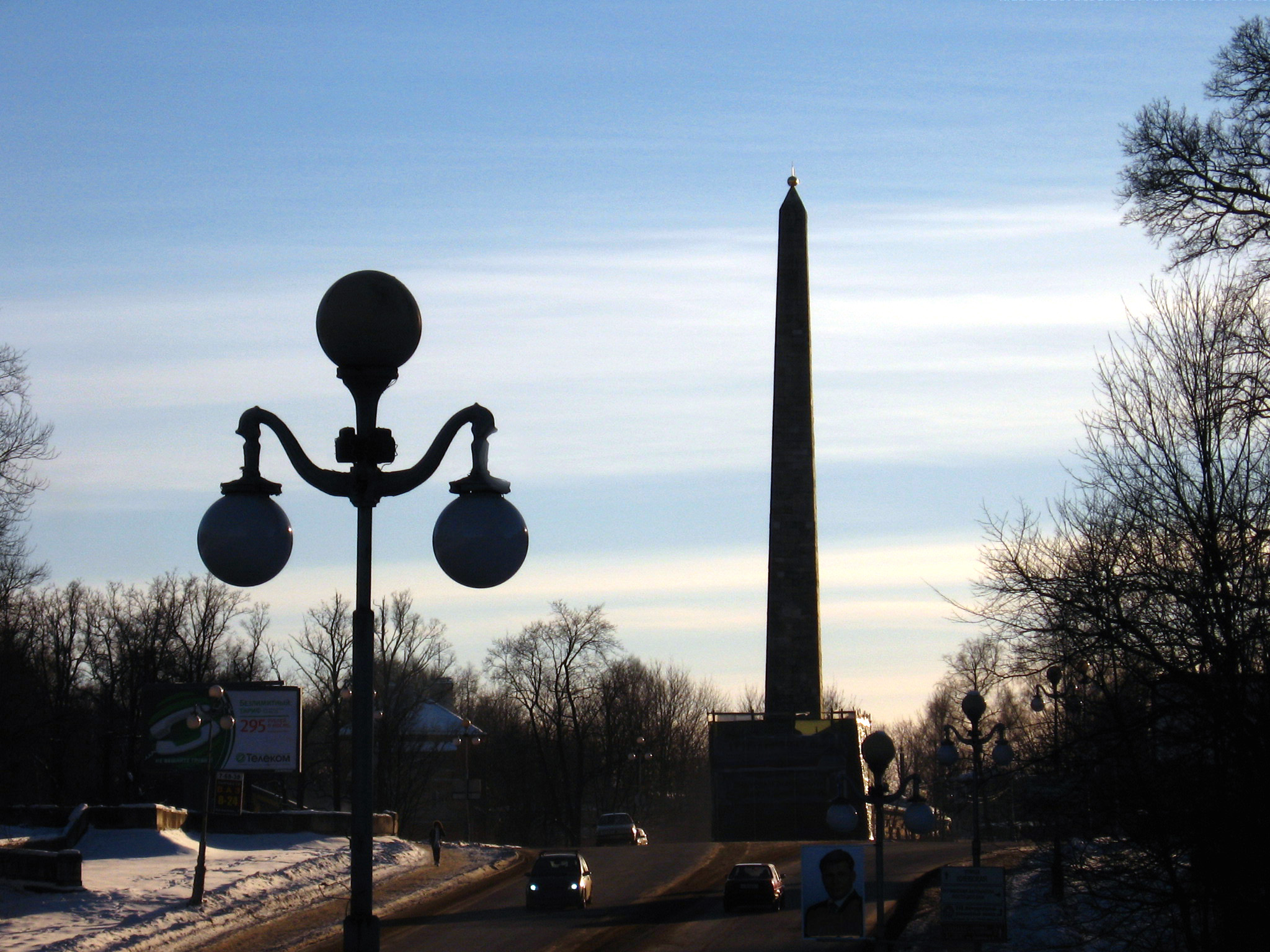
Connetable

Connetable (Russian: Коннетабль) is an obelisk and square in Gatchina, Russia, located at the intersection of 25 October Prospect (main city's street) and Krasnoarmeysky Prospect. The author of the project was probably Vincenzo Brenna.
