= Jane Lyon =

Scottish nanny

Jane (Jenny) Lyon
- Born: 1771; Edinburgh
- Died: 1842 (aged 70–71); Tsarskoe Selo
- Occupation: Nanny to Russian imperial family
- Employer: Russian imperial family

Jane (Jenny) Lyon (1771–1842) was a Scottish nanny to the Russian imperial family.

== Biography ==
Jane Lyon was born in Edinburgh in 1771. Her father and elder brothers had been recruited in 1784 by Catherine the Great's Scottish architect, Charles Cameron, to assist in building works at Tsarskoe Selo, the imperial estate near St. Petersburg.

When Jenny joined them later she was appointed nanny in 1796 to Catherine's grandson, the infant Grand-Duke Nicholas, the future Tsar Nicholas (1796-1855), caring for him until the age of seven and retaining his affection thereafter. He called her the 'nanny-lioness' (niania- l'vitsa), also known in Russian as Evgenia Vasil'evna Laion.

She remained with the imperial family for almost 40 years and was described in 1835 as:

'quite a character ... [T]hey all doted on her and could not exist without her... she kept their money, their jewels etc. and had charge of everything'.

== Influence on Nicholas I of Russia ==
Simon Sebag Montefiore claims that 'Nicholas had been taught to hate the Jews by' Jane Lyon.

== The Scottish influence ==
Lyon was not the only Scottish nanny/governess recruited to imperial service. The empress Catherine had earlier appointed two Scottish nurses for her elder grandchildren: Pauline Gessler and Sarah Nichols, n. Primrose.

In the nineteenth century, several more Scottish nurses entered the imperial household, including Catherine McKinnon (c. 1778 - 1858), employed during the reign of Alexander I as nanny to Alexander II (1818–81).

These Scotswomen were 'responsible, it was said, for giving the Russian rulers a particularly Scottish lilt to their English'.

== Bibliography ==
- Lincoln, W.B. (1989) Nicholas I: emperor and autocrat of all the Russias
- Sheets, J.W. (1993) 'Miss Catherine McKinnon's Russian fortune', Scottish Studies 31, pp. 88 – 100
- Shvidovsky, D. (1996) The Empress and the Architect
