= Rossi Pavilion =

Pavilion in the Mikhailovsky Garden in Saint Petersburg, Russia

Coordinates: 59°56′27″N 30°20′2″E

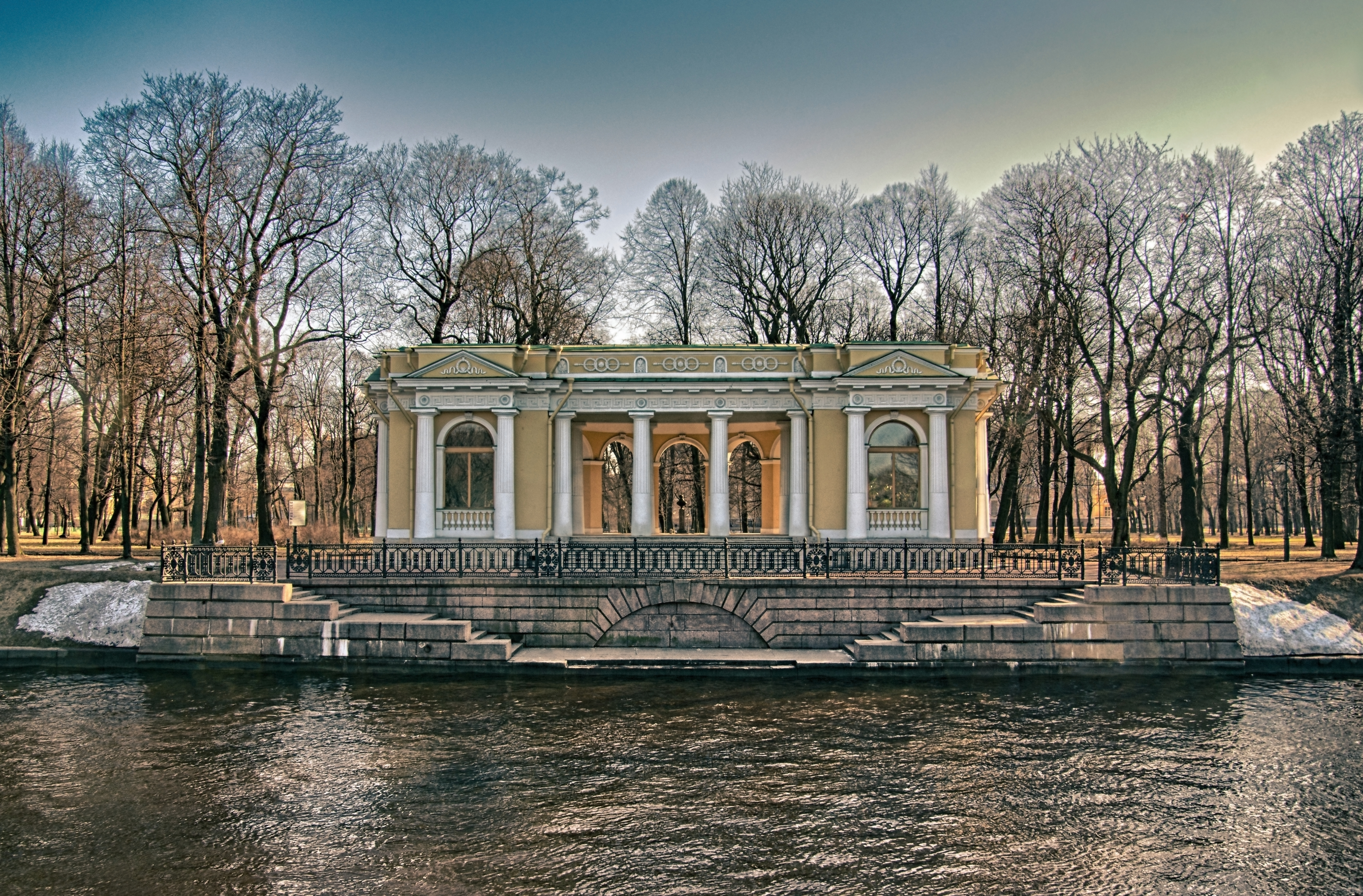
View of the Rossi Pavilion from across the Moyka River

The Rossi Pavilion (Russian: Павильон Росси) is a pavilion on the bank of the Moyka River in the Mikhailovsky Garden in Saint Petersburg. It was designed by architect Carlo Rossi in the early 1820s and built in 1825 during his redevelopment of the garden.

The site now occupied by the pavilion was previously the location of one of the city's early imperial palaces, the Golden Mansion of Peter the Great's wife, Empress Catherine. The palace was demolished on the orders of Catherine the Great in 1768, and was only redeveloped in the early 1820s as part of the construction of the Mikhailovsky Palace complex. As part of the new ensemble, the gardens between the palace and the Moyka River were laid out in the style of an English landscape garden. The pavilion, designed by Rossi in the Neoclassical style, was built to provide an area for pleasure and refreshment overlooking the river, with a pier where boats could moor. The pavilion survived the Soviet period and was part of the large-scale restoration of the garden in the early 2000s. As part of this work, a bust of Carlo Rossi was placed in the pavilion.

== Location and design ==
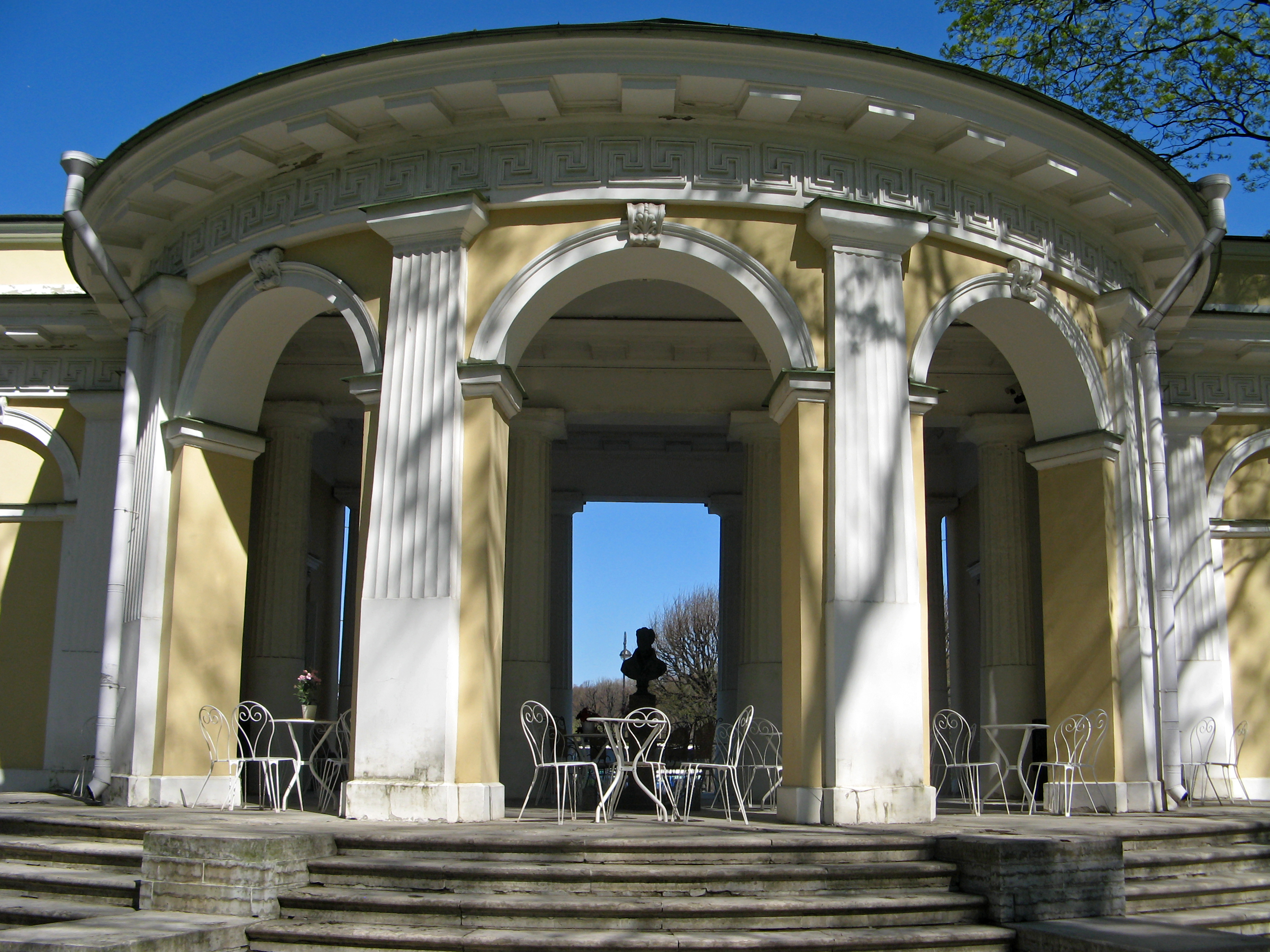
The pavilion viewed from the garden

The pavilion sits in the northern end of the Mikhailovsky Garden, on the southern bank of the Moyka River. Designed in the Neoclassical style, it has an open Doric colonnade connecting two square rooms, cast-iron fences, and a pier on the river accessed by two flights of granite steps. The pavilion is in the east of the garden, off the centre line of the Mikhailovsky Palace to the south, but aligned with the centre line of the Field of Mars to the north. Explanations for this are either that Rossi had planned a second pavilion to be built to the west, creating a symmetrical view to and from the Mikhailovsky Palace, but the second pavilion was never built; or that it was a deliberate choice by Rossi to connect the Mikhailovsky ensemble with the Field of Mars ensemble on the other side of the river.

The site of the pavilion had previously been occupied by the Golden Mansion of Empress Catherine, the wife of Peter the Great. The garden had been granted by Peter to Catherine in 1712 for her residence, which was a relatively small wooden construction, receiving its name from its golden spire, with some rooms decorated with gilded leather. It was demolished on the orders of Catherine the Great in 1768.

== Construction and history ==
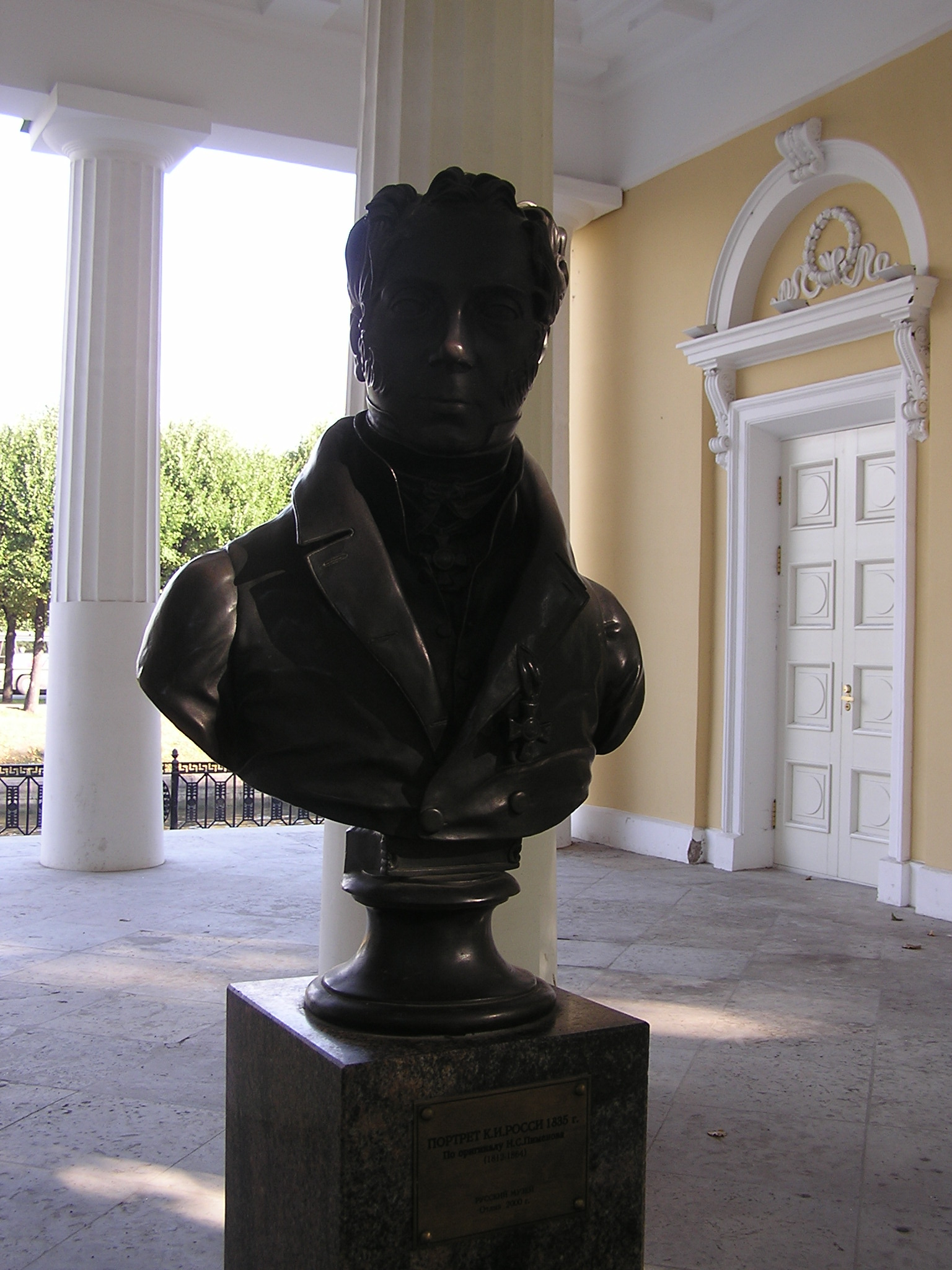
Bust of architect Carlo Rossi in the pavilion

The pavilion formed part of the general reconstruction of the garden and its surrounding areas, begun in 1817 under the orders of Emperor Alexander I. The centrepiece was to be a new palace complex for his younger brother, Grand Duke Michael Pavlovich. The palace was designed by Rossi, while the plans for the garden were drawn up by Rossi and Adam Menelaws, and approved by the emperor in April 1822. The garden plans followed the style and techniques of English landscape gardens, which had become internationally popular in the eighteenth century. The existing ponds were reshaped into more natural meandering outlines and picturesque groups of trees supplemented the plantings along the pathways. The pavilion and its pier, designed by Rossi and completed in 1825, formed part of this ensemble, and was intended "for romantic meetings on summer evenings over a cup of tea or playing cards". Rossi himself designed the railings for the pier, which were cast by the Aleksandrovsky Iron Foundry. A surviving description of the two rooms of the pavilion records that in one "the ceiling is painted with lemon-coloured figures and arabesques. The arches above the door, windows and mirrors are painted stucco work ... The walls are painted yellow ... The furniture is mahogany ... the upholstery of blue calico with yellow flowers." In the other, the walls are green, "the ceiling is painted with green figures and arabesques, the mahogany furniture is covered with green chintz with yellow flowers."

The pavilion was included in restoration work, carried out between 2002 and 2004, which restored the gardens to Rossi's original designs. During this time a bust of Rossi, a copy of a work by Nikolai Pimenov, was installed in the pavilion. On 10 July 2001 the pavilion was designated "an object of historical and cultural heritage of federal significance."
