= Arts Square =

Square in Saint Petersburg, Russia

Coordinates: 59°56′14″N 30°19′54″E

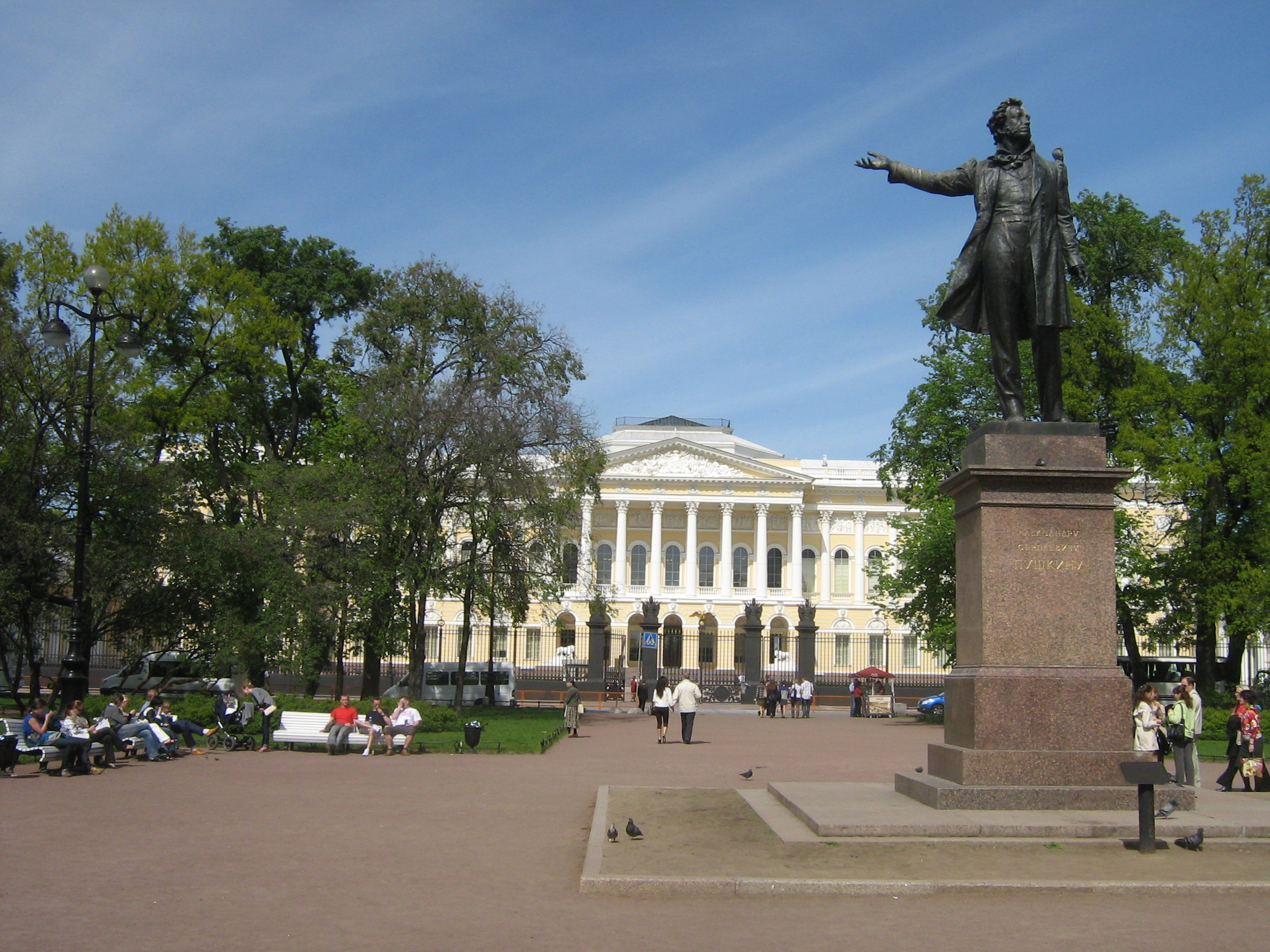
Statue of Alexander Pushkin in front of the Russian Museum.

The Arts Square (Russian: площадь Искусств, Ploshchad Iskusstv) is an open public square in the center of Saint Petersburg, Russia.

== History ==
Before the construction of the Square, the land was the hunting grounds of the Empress Anna of Russia. Then Russian architect Francesco Bartolomeo Rastrelli (1700–1771) created a garden maze on the site. In the early 19th century, the Russian architect Carlo Rossi (1775–1849) was commissioned to develop the land between the Field of Mars and the Nevsky Prospect. The Mikhailovsky Palace, which now houses the main building of the Russian Museum, stood out as its most prominent building. Rossi also designed the Square, and the facades of the buildings facing Italianskaya Ulitsa and Mikhailovskaya Ulitsa.

His work was completed by other architects with the Mikhailovsky Theatre, the Jaquot House, the Saint Petersburg Philharmonia, and the Mikhailovsky Square Garden at its center.

From 1834 to 1918, the square was known as the Mikhailovskaya Square (Russian: Михайловская площадь), and as the Lassalle Square (Russian: площадь Лассаля) from 1923 to 1952.

In 1902, when the Mikhailovsky Palace was turned into the Russian Museum, the eastern wing became the Russian Museum of Ethnography, a new address on Arts Square.

In August 1939, Isaak Brodsky died in his apartment on Arts Square, which then became a national museum.

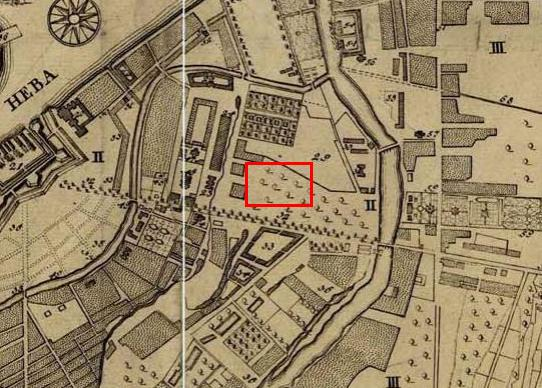
Location of territory of future square of Arts on the 1737 year map.

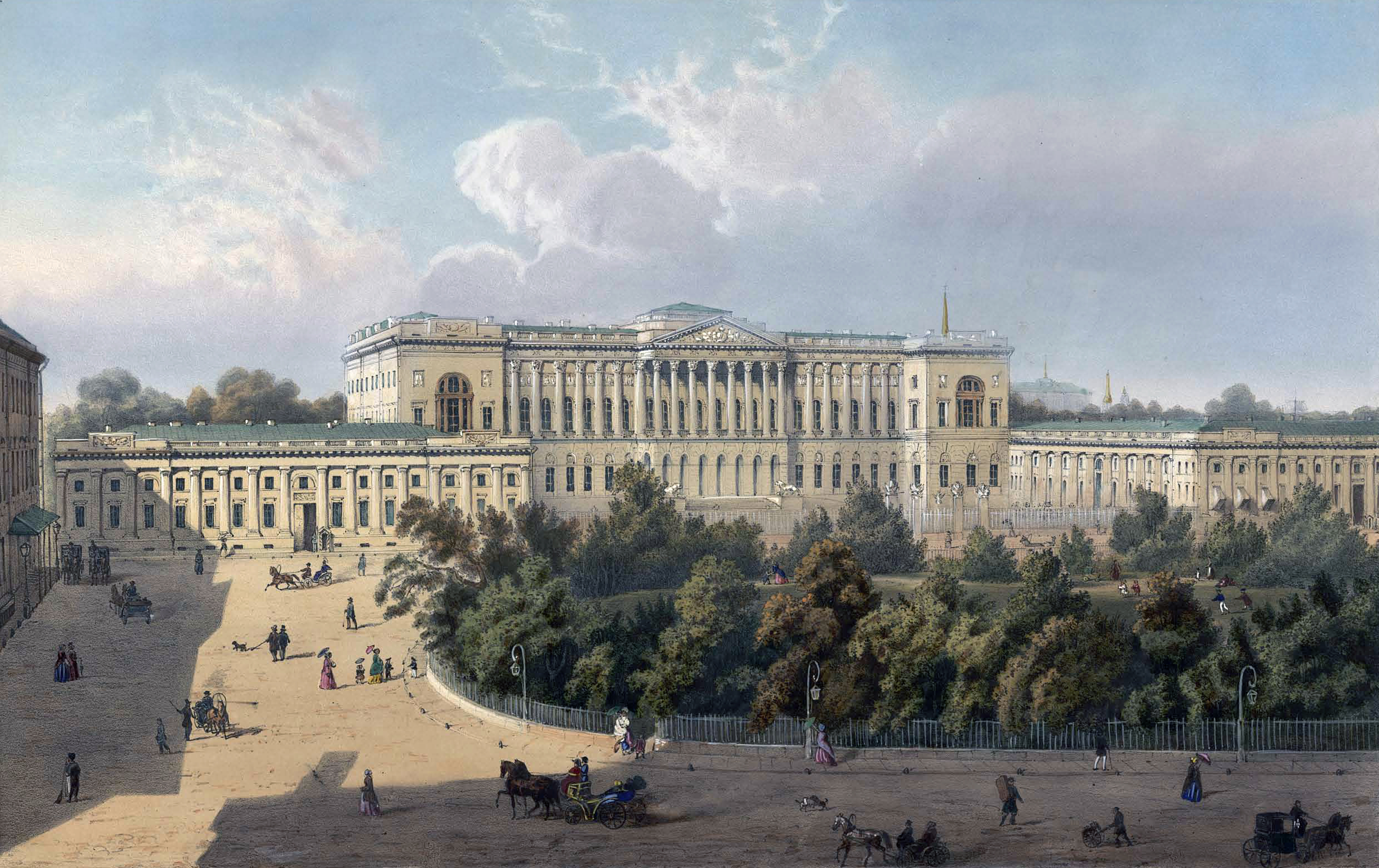
Mikhailovskaya square and the Mikhailovsky Palace in the 19th century, lithograph after a drawing by Joseph-Maria Charlemagne-Baudet.

== Buildings ==
Central to the Square is the Mikhailovsky Square Garden with a statue of Alexander Pushkin. Around the square are the following buildings:

- Saint Petersburg Philharmonia
- Mikhailovsky Theatre
- Russian Museum (world's largest museum of Russian art)
- Russian Museum of Ethnography
- Jaquot House
- Kutuzov House
- Vielgorsky House
- Lazarev House
- Church of St. Catherine (its residential building)
- The Grand Hotel Europe
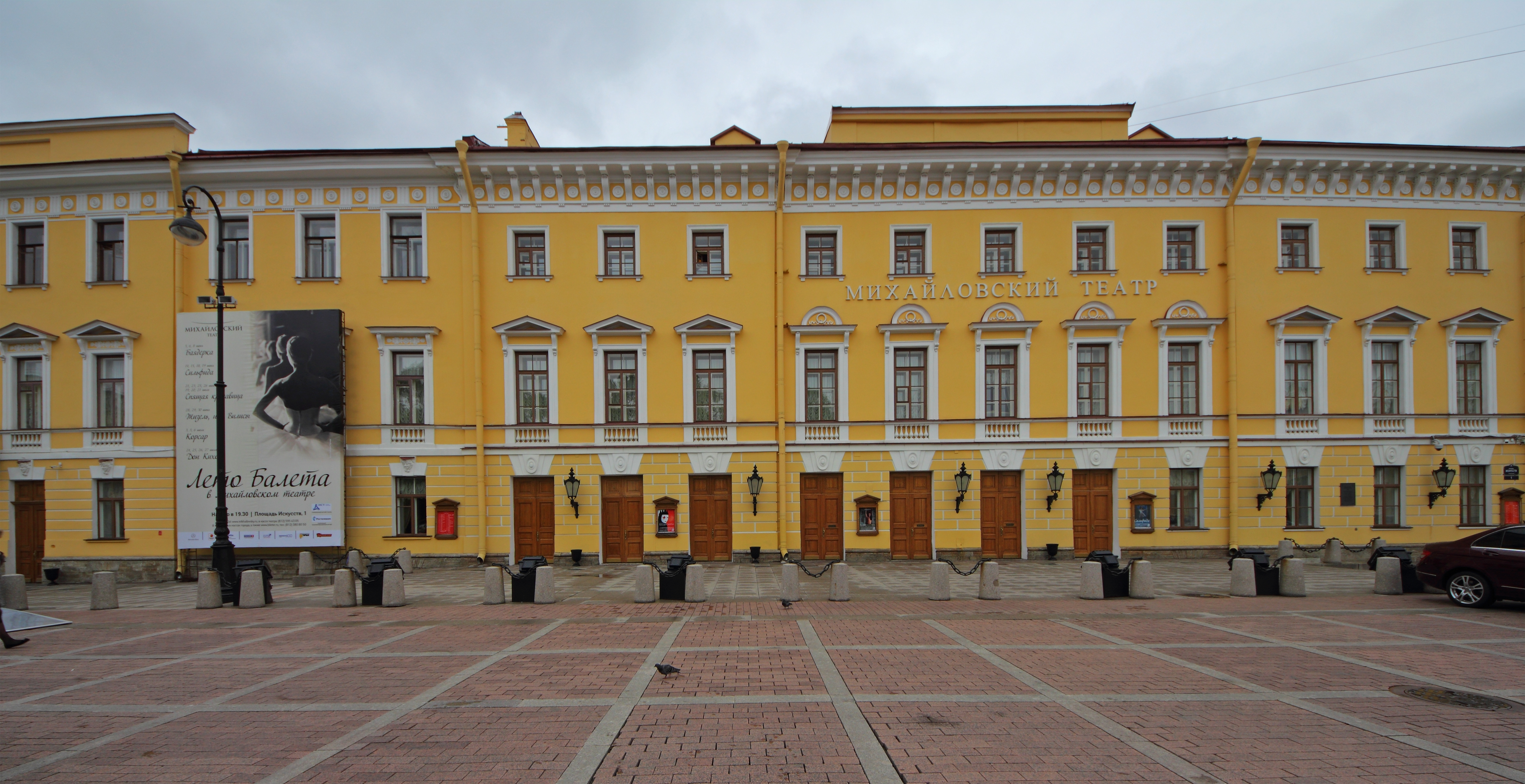
Mikhailovsky Theatre.

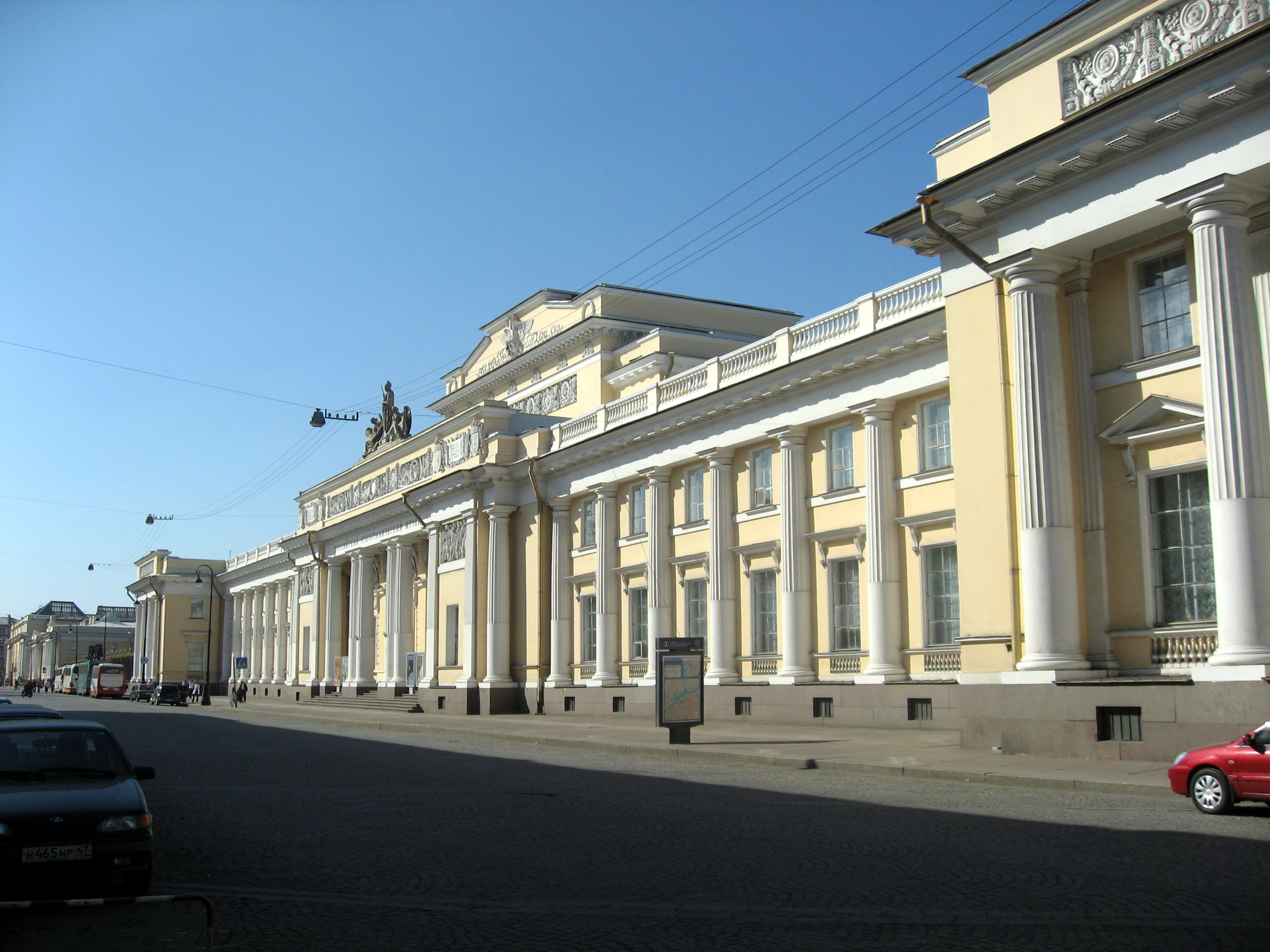
The doric colonnade, building housing the Russian Museum and the Russian Museum of Ethnography.

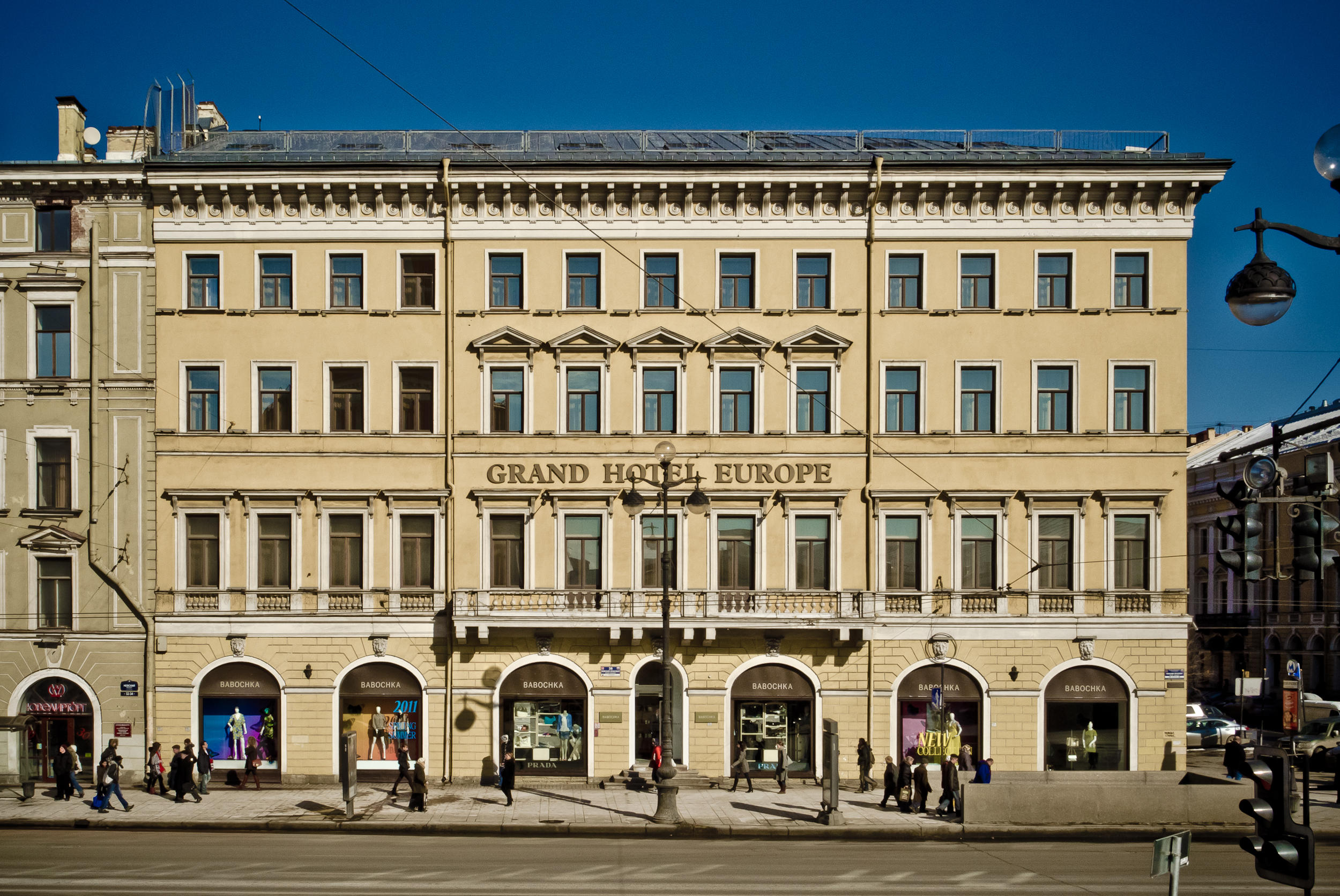
Grand Hotel Europe.

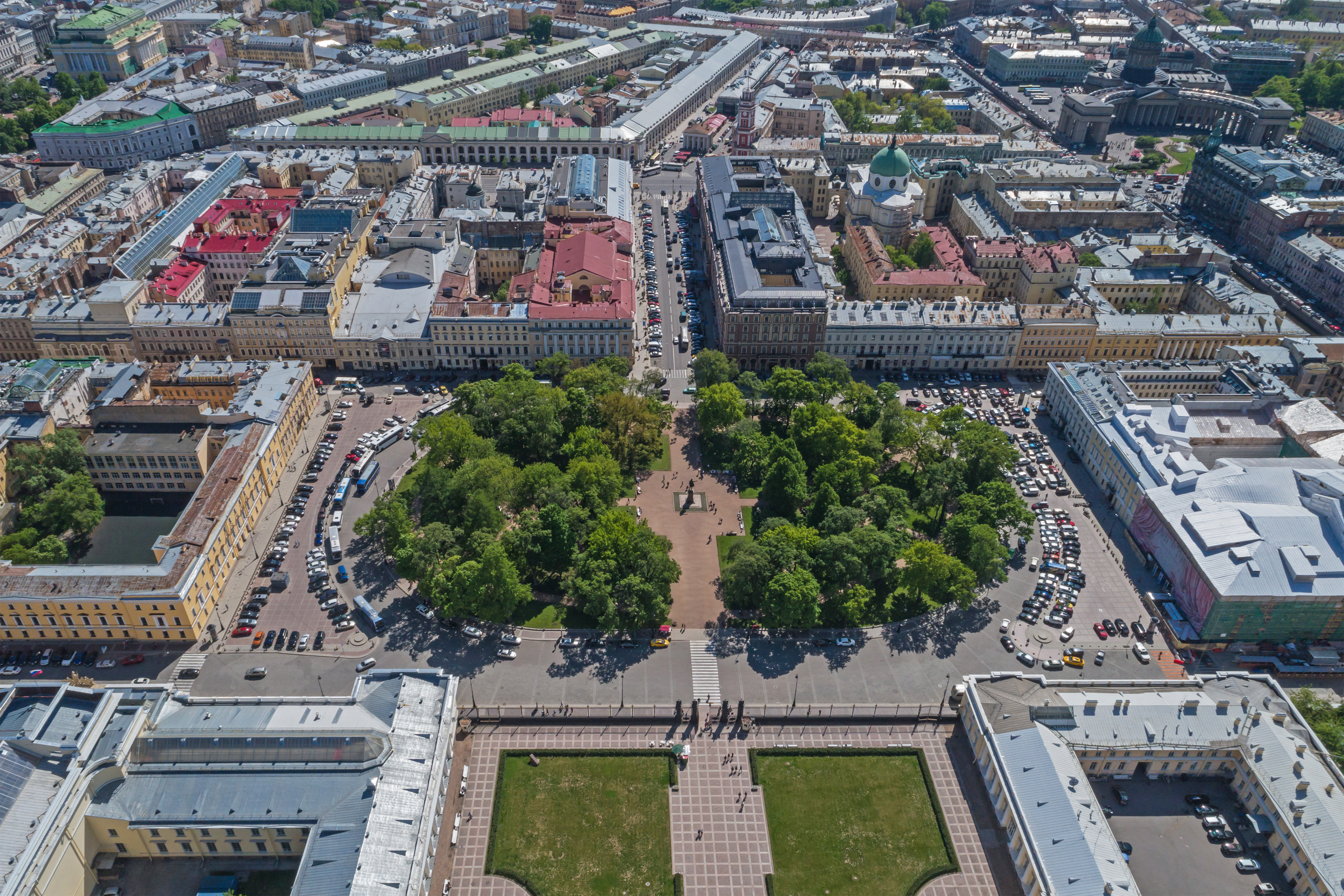
Aerial photo of Arts Square in Saint Petersburg.

== Events ==
Every year, the Saint Petersburg Philharmonia organizes the Arts Square International Festival in Saint-Petersburg. The event is free.

== See also ==
- List of squares in Saint Petersburg
