= Rossi Bridge =

Bridge in Saint Petersburg, Russia

Coordinates: 59°56′20″N 30°20′8″E

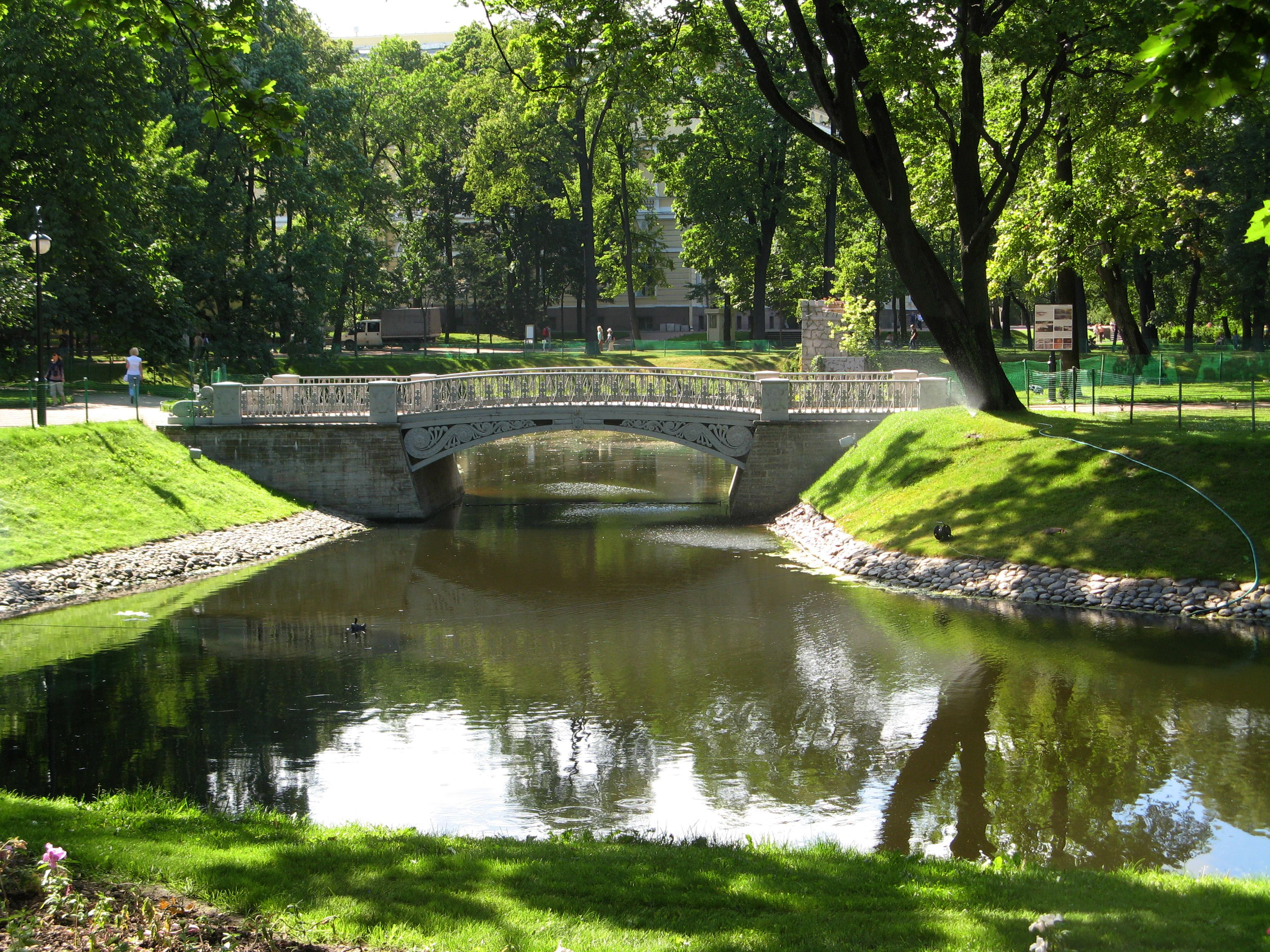
View of the Rossi Bridge from the Mikhailovsky Garden

The Rossi Bridge (Russian: Мост Росси) is a cast-iron bridge in the Mikhailovsky Garden in Saint Petersburg. It was designed by architect Carlo Rossi during his redevelopment of the garden in the early 1820s, and built in 1825.

Built to span the neck between two large ponds in the east of the garden, the bridge was constructed of cast-iron spans supported by brick abutments lined with limestone. The fencing and pedestals making up the parapet are also of cast iron. Little survives of the original construction details, with the exception of an architectural plan from 1826. The bridge and ponds suffered during the twentieth century, with one of the ponds being filled in, leaving the bridge half buried in earth. Restoration works in the early 2000s restored the ponds and bridge back to their original appearance. Today the bridge is the only one in Saint Petersburg to retain most of its original cast-iron parts.

== Design and history ==
The area now occupied by the Mikhailovsky Garden had previously been the site of the Golden Mansion of Empress Catherine, the wife of Peter the Great, and its surrounding land. The garden had been granted by Peter to Catherine in 1712 for her residence, which was a relatively small wooden construction, receiving its name from its golden spire, with some rooms decorated with gilded leather. It was demolished on the orders of Catherine the Great in 1768. The construction of the bridge formed part of the general redevelopment of the garden and its surrounding areas, begun in 1817 under the orders of Emperor Alexander I. The centrepiece was to be a new palace complex for his younger brother, Grand Duke Michael Pavlovich. The palace was designed by Rossi, while the plans for the garden were drawn up by Rossi and Adam Menelaws, and approved by the emperor in April 1822. The garden plans followed the style and techniques of English landscape gardens, which had become internationally popular in the eighteenth century. The existing ponds were reshaped into more natural meandering outlines and picturesque groups of trees supplemented the plantings along the pathways.

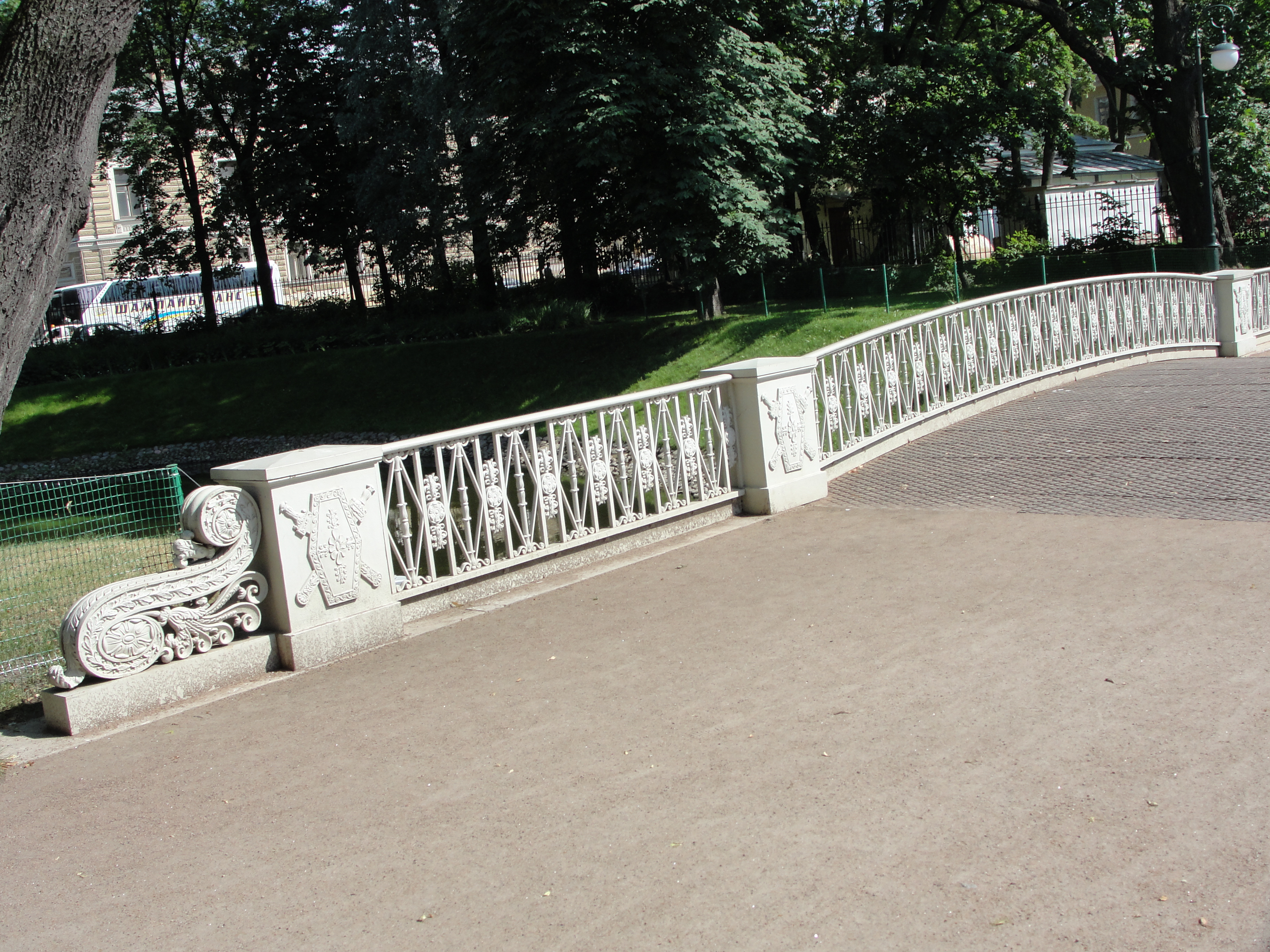
The bridge's cast-iron railings and decorative pedestals

The bridge, also designed by Rossi, is about 30 ft (9.1 m) long, and crosses a neck connecting two ponds in the east of the garden. It has brick abutments lined with limestone blocks, and is supported by five cast-iron lattice trusses, its ribs being cast in halves. The parapet consists of cast-iron fencing fixed to pedestals with decorative elements. Little information about the construction survives, with the exception of an architectural drawing dated 1826 and signed by Rossi. Between 1900 and 1911 the easternmost of the two ponds was filled in as part of the construction of the building of the Russian Museum of Ethnography, and the bridge was half buried in earth. The bridge and ponds underwent restoration between 2002 and 2003 as part of the general programme of works that recreated Rossi's original plans for the garden. The Rossi Bridge is the only bridge structure in Saint Petersburg to retain most of its original cast-iron elements and arched structures, only a few having been replaced by new castings based on the surviving originals. On 10 July 2001 the garden and its ensemble were designated as objects "of historical and cultural heritage of federal significance."
