= Mikhailovsky Garden =

Park in Saint Petersburg, Russia

Coordinates: 59°56′23″N 30°19′58″E

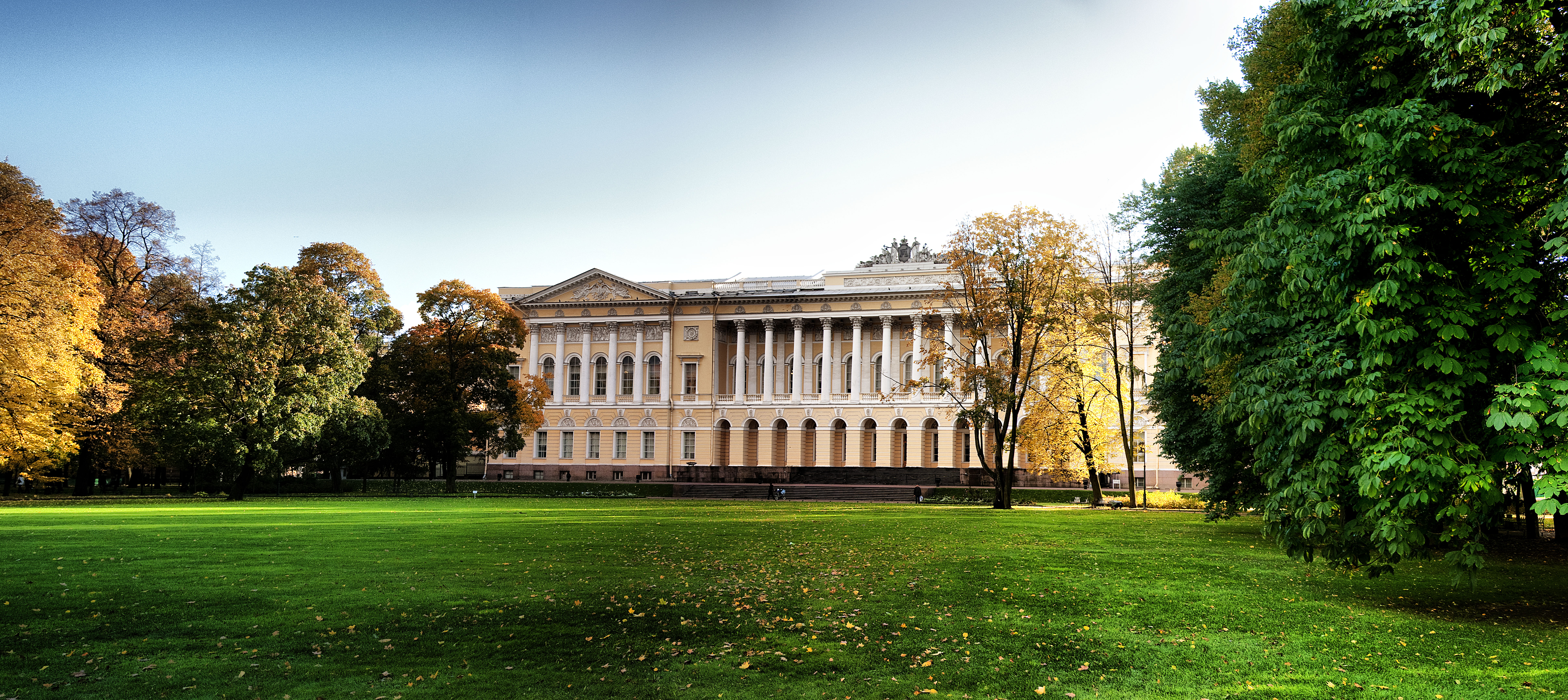
View across the Mikhailovsky Garden towards the northern facade of the Mikhailovsky Palace

The Mikhailovsky Garden (Russian: Михайловский сад) is a large area of parkland and landscape garden in the centre of Saint Petersburg.

The garden was one of the early developments of the city soon after its foundation. Previously it had been part of the estates and hunting grounds of a Swedish noble, but after its capture during the region's conquest by the Russians in the early 1700s, it became part of the imperial estates, and was granted by Peter the Great to his wife Catherine for her palace. Catherine's palace, on the banks of the Moyka River, was known as the Golden Mansion, and the surrounding land was developed by Jean-Baptiste Alexandre Le Blond as a garden both for pleasure, and to provide supplies for the imperial household. During this time it went by several names, including the "Swedish Garden", the "Tsaritsyn Garden", and the "Third Summer Garden". The garden was further developed during the reigns of Empress Anna Ioannovna and Empress Elizabeth, who built new palaces and arranged the land to suit their own preferences. Empress Catherine's palace was demolished in 1768 and during the reign of Emperor Paul I the Mikhailovsky Castle was built to the east of the gardens. The garden was included in these redevelopments, but Paul was assassinated in the castle in 1801, and for some years after that the area was neglected.

The next large scale redevelopment took place in the 1810s when Emperor Alexander I commissioned a new palace complex for his younger brother, Grand Duke Michael Pavlovich from architect Carlo Rossi. The Mikhailovsky Palace, named for its occupant, was completed in 1825 to the south of the garden, which was also substantially redeveloped as part of an ensemble that included the land to the north across the Field of Mars and as far as the Neva River. Assisted by Adam Menelaws, Rossi introduced the style and techniques of English landscape gardens, creating a large irregular oval meadow with alleyways, while the ponds were reshaped into more natural meandering outlines. Rossi also designed a pavilion and pier and a bridge as features for the garden. The garden served as the private grounds of the palace until its purchase for the state in 1898 and the establishment of the Russian Museum, at which point it became a city park.

The garden survived the Soviet period, but suffered significant changes to its original composition. Children's play areas, tennis courts and public toilets were built on its grounds, while tree planting was carried out haphazardly, eventually blocking important sightlines around the ensemble. Transferred to the Russian Museum in 1999, the garden underwent substantial restoration in the early 2000s, which recreated Rossi's original designs. The garden was designated an "object of historical and cultural heritage of federal significance" in 2001, and since 2008 has hosted the annual International "Imperial Gardens of Russia" Festival.

== Location and layout ==
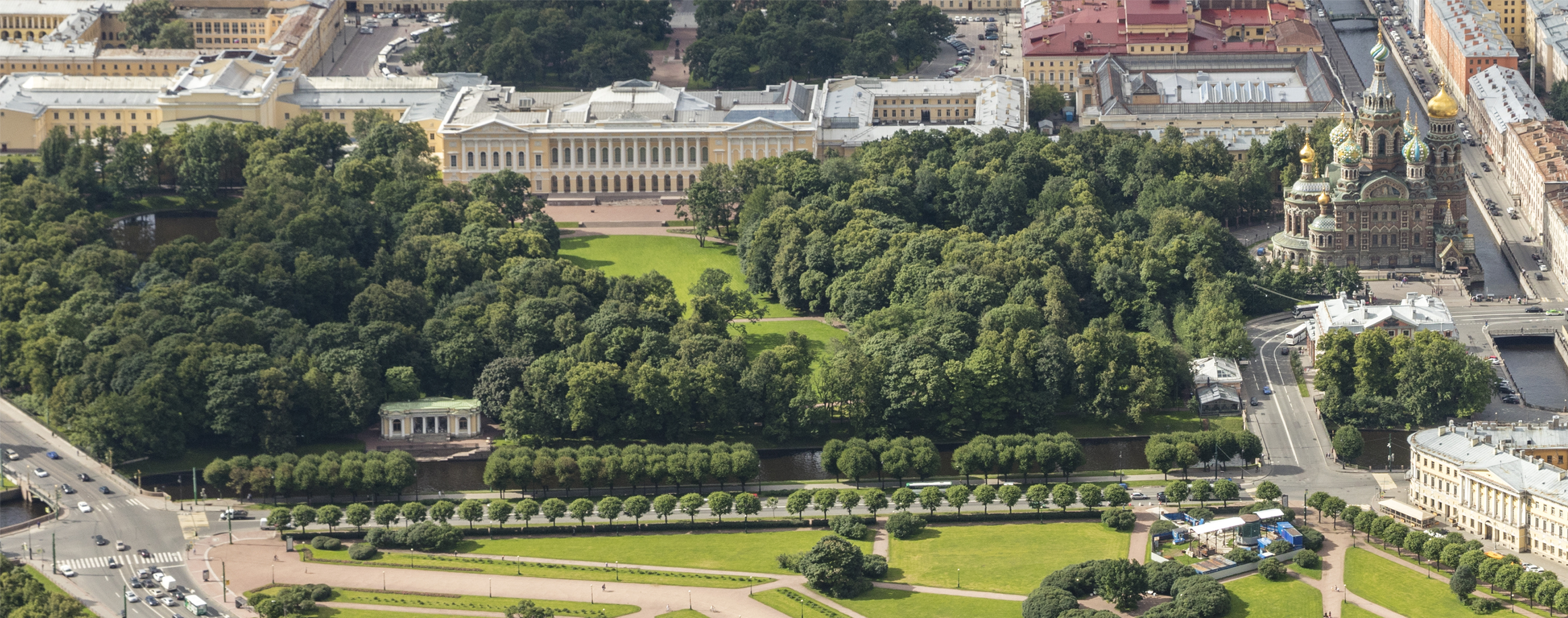
Aerial view of the Mikhailovsky Garden, looking towards the south. The course of the Moyka River and the Rossi Pavilion in the foreground, and the Mikhailovsky Palace in the background. The Church of the Saviour on Blood is visible to the right of the picture.

The Mikhailovsky Garden is in Dvortsovy Municipal Okrug, part of the Tsentralny District of the city. It covers 9.4 hectares and lies to the north of the Mikhailovsky Palace, now the main building of the Russian Museum, and its extension, the Benois Wing. The building of the Russian Museum of Ethnography completes the southern boundary of the garden. To the east the garden is bordered by Sadovaya Street, and to the west by the Griboyedov Canal and embankment, and the Church of the Saviour on Blood. The Moyka River flows across the northern end of the garden, and separates it from the Field of Mars.

== History ==
=== Catherine's garden ===
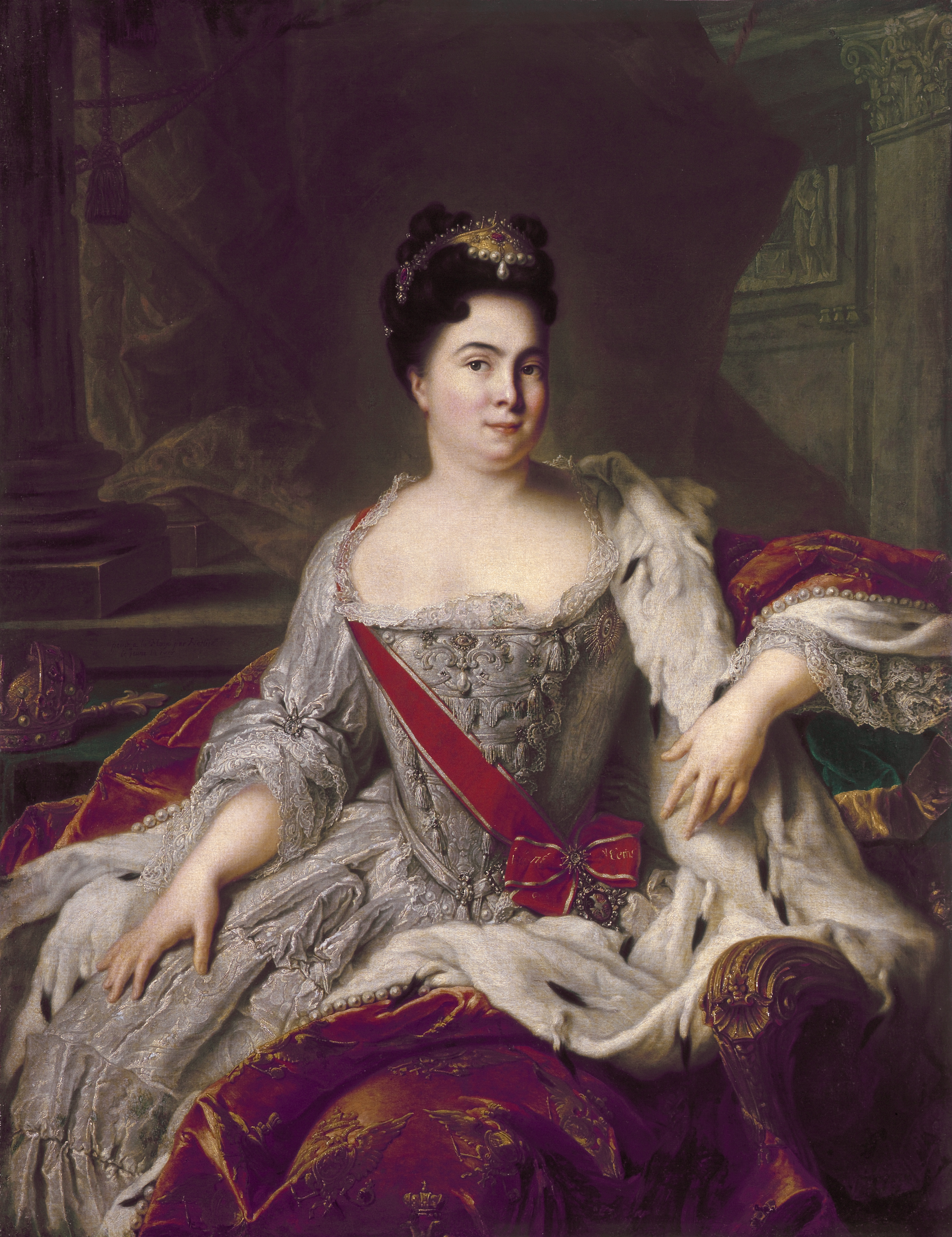
Empress Catherine, for whom the first garden and palace complex was built. A 1717 portrait by Jean-Marc Nattier

The area now partly occupied by the Mikhailovsky Garden, prior to the region's conquest by the Russians and the founding of Saint Petersburg, was the site of various rural settlements. In a map of 1698 it is marked as belonging to the estate of a Swedish rotmister named Konau, and contained his hunting grounds. With the establishment of the city of Saint Petersburg and the imperial residences in the area, the region became the property of the crown. Peter the Great gifted the land to his wife Catherine in 1712 for the purpose of building a residence. In 1716 Peter commissioned architect Jean-Baptiste Alexandre Le Blond to create a series of summer gardens for the imperial palaces. Le Blond's first and second gardens were located on the grounds of what is now the Summer Garden. The third occupied the site of the present-day Mikhailovsky Garden, and was the location of Empress Catherine's palace. Catherine's palace occupied a site on the banks of the Moyka River, now the location of the Rossi Pavilion. It was a relatively small wooden construction, known as the "Golden Mansion" because its tiled roof was decorated with a golden spire, with some rooms decorated with gilded leather. The palace garden stretched southwards between the Krivusha and Fontanka Rivers almost as far as Bolshaya Perspekpekty, the modern-day Nevsky Prospect. It was known at different times as the "Swedish Garden", the "Tsaritsyn Garden", and the "Third Summer Garden". Le Blond's plan, personally approved by Peter the Great, envisaged a single large palace and park ensemble that was to include the imperial residences and gardens.

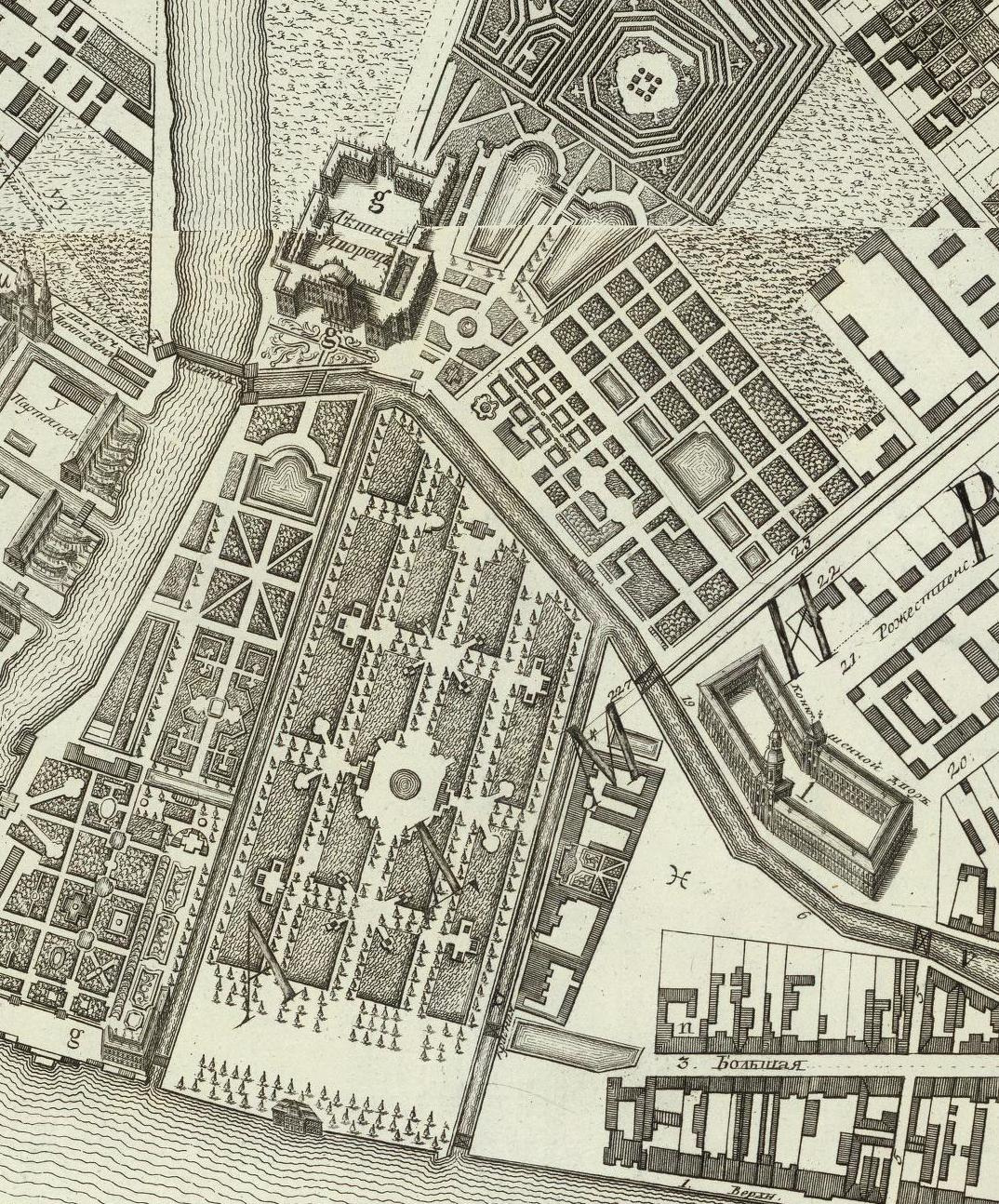
The garden as it appears on a 1753 map of the city. The grid pattern of ponds and garden plots are visible. To the left is Empress Elizabeth's Summer Palace, while at the bottom are the Summer Garden and the Tsaritsyn Meadow, the future Field of Mars.

The garden design combined aesthetic qualities with practical considerations. Fir trees, trimmed into pyramidal shapes, were grown near the palace, while an alley of chestnut trees linked it with gazebos, a fountain, and sculptures. The garden was also intended to supply the palaces with provisions, and the southwestern half of the garden was laid out with fruit trees, vegetable gardens and berry bushes, with five rectangular ponds to supply fresh fish. "French-Italian cellars" were also located in the grounds, providing storage space for imported wines and other foodstuffs, while 50 nightingales were brought to the garden from Moscow, Pskov and Novgorod Governorates. In his diary entry of 11 July 1721, kamer-junker Friedrich Wilhelm von Bergholz recorded that bananas and pineapples had been successfully grown in the garden. A number of farm buildings, stables, barns and servants' quarters were laid out in the grounds of the palace, while Catherine ordered the laying out of pathways along the Moyka and Fontanka. Access between the Third and Second Summer Gardens was via a floating bridge across the Moyka. By 1718 the garden was under the care of the Hanoverian gardener Gaspar Focht, as were the First and Second Summer Gardens, and the Pharmacy Garden, now the Saint Petersburg Botanical Garden.

=== The reigns of the Empresses ===
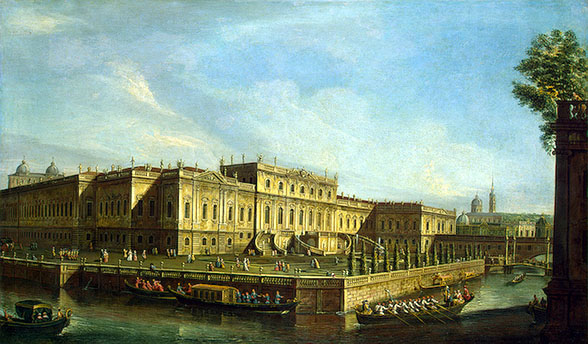
Empress Elizabeth's Summer Palace in a 1756 view by Mikhail Makhaev

The garden was partially redeveloped during the reign of Empress Anna Ioannovna, with the vegetable garden and orchards relocated to the east bank of the Fontanka, and replaced with a small hunting area where hares and deer were kept in specially fenced areas. A nursery of maple trees was also established. A more comprehensive redesign occurred during the reign of Empress Elizabeth, who commissioned Francesco Bartolomeo Rastrelli to build a new Summer Palace for her. Construction began on the wooden palace on 24 June 1741, with the Empress taking up residence in it in 1745. The garden was redesigned with a more regular layout with longitudinal and transverse avenues, and with trees trimmed into geometric shapes, with added sculptures, ponds, flower beds and pavilions. A bathhouse was built on the banks of the Moyka, with amusements such as swings, merry-go-rounds, and slides placed in the centre of the garden. The Golden Mansion survived until 1768, when it was demolished on the orders of Catherine the Great.

Shortly after Emperor Paul's accession to the throne in 1796, he ordered the demolition of Empress Elizabeth's Summer Palace and its replacement with the Mikhailovsky Castle, which was finally completed in 1801. The garden was once more included in the new developments, which retained most of the existing ponds, while planting lines of trees around their perimeters. Four of the five original fishponds were preserved, and were connected together by underground pipes which linked them with an ornamental pond in the western part of the garden. Water became an important feature in the new designs, which envisaged the Mikhailovsky Castle as a moated construction, entirely surrounded by water and crossed by drawbridges which could be raised. The castle stood between four waterways: the Moyka and Fontanka Rivers, and the specially-dug Church and Voskresensky Canals. After Paul's assassination in the castle in 1801, the imperial family abandoned the residence, and it and its surroundings fell into disrepair, with the castle eventually transferred to the Main Engineering School in 1822.

=== Rossi's ensemble ===
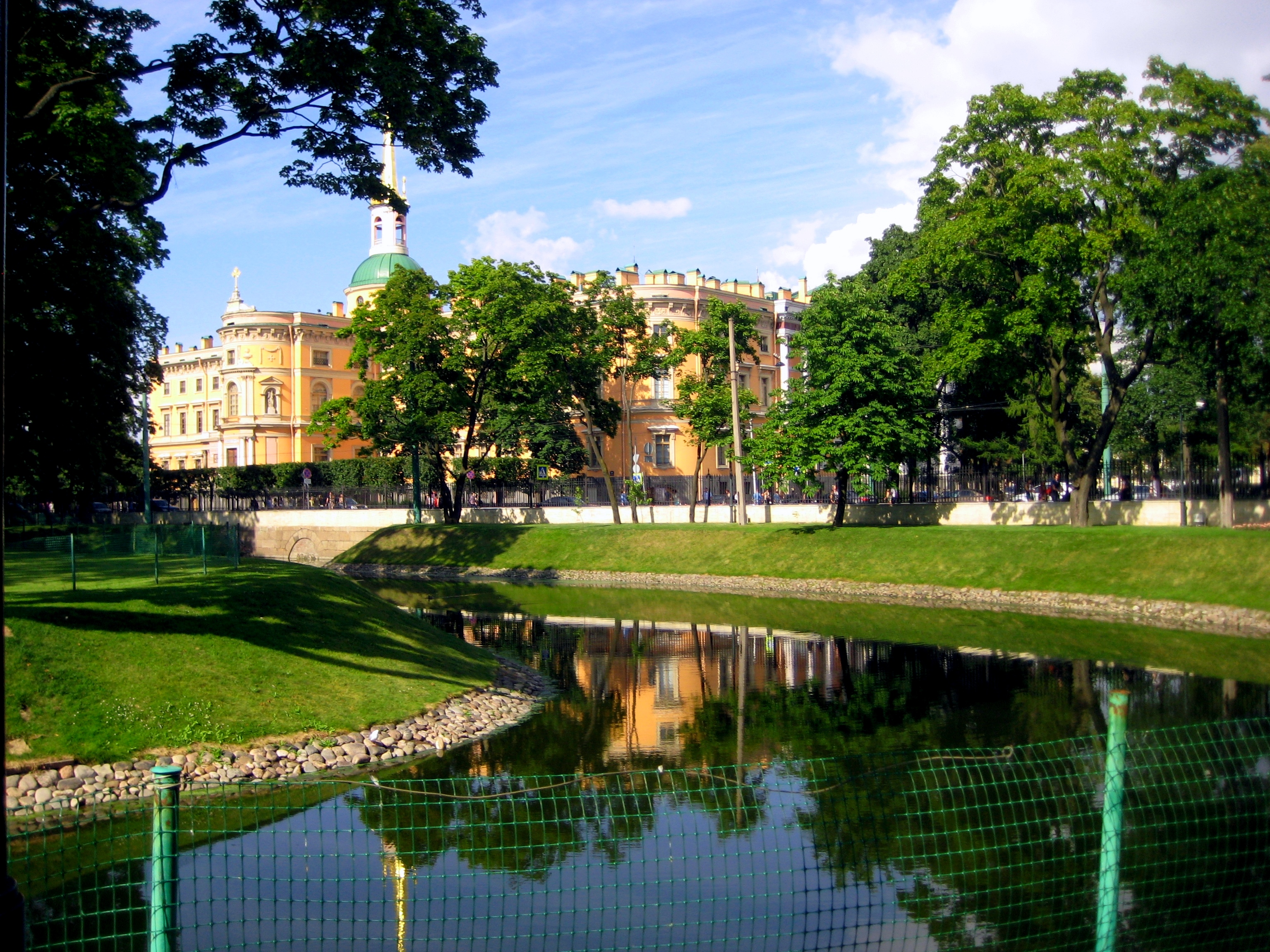
The curving banks of the garden's pond, typical of English landscape gardens. The Mikhailovsky Castle in the background.

In 1817, Emperor Alexander I commissioned a major redevelopment of the area of the city between Nevsky Prospect and Palace Embankment, centred around a new palace complex for his younger brother, Grand Duke Michael Pavlovich. The ensemble, the last palace ensemble built in the city, was the work of architect Carlo Rossi, and envisaged an entirely new arrangement for the gardens surrounding what became the Mikhailovsky Palace. The greenhouses which covered the southern part of the garden became the site of the new palace, while the area stretching north from the palace to the Moyka became the palace garden and grounds. Thus by 1825 it had become known as the Mikhailovsky Garden. The plans for the garden were drawn up by Rossi and Adam Menelaws, and approved by the emperor in April 1822. The land around the Mikhailovsky Castle was also redeveloped under the scheme, approved by Alexander in 1823, and involving the filling in of the Church Canal and part of the garden's eastern ornamental pond. The earlier water system, linking the garden's ponds with the castle's watercourses, was otherwise retained, and further expanded with an underground channel linking the garden's large pond with the Moyka. Rossi also retained Leblon and Rastrelli's practice of dividing the garden into sections, and planted new trees around the castle.

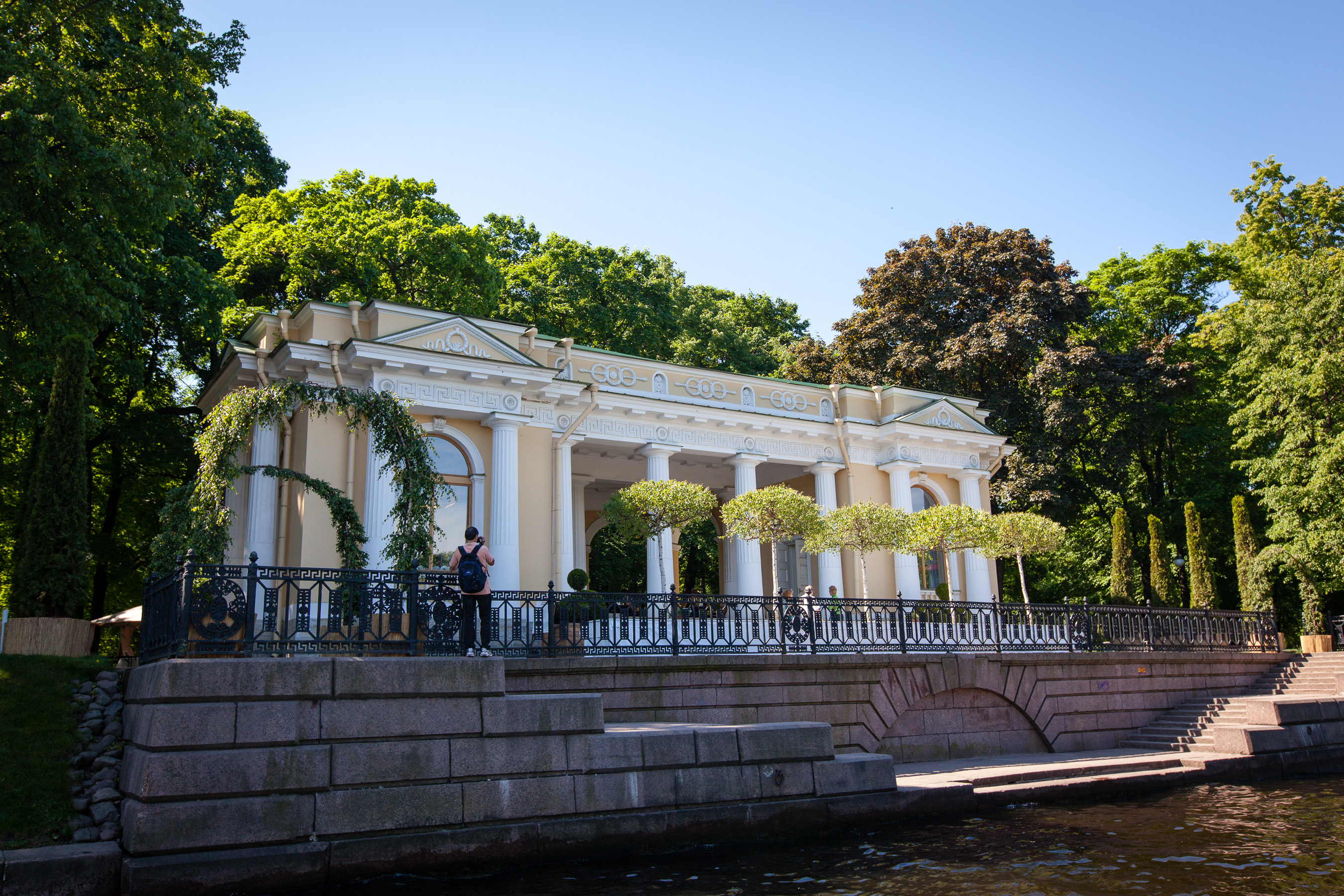
The Rossi Pavilion, viewed from the Moyka River

For the overall layout of the garden, Rossi followed the style and techniques of English landscape gardens, which had become internationally popular in the eighteenth century. The garden facade of the Mikhailovsky Palace looked out over a large irregular oval meadow, bordered by alleyways and laid out in a grid pattern. The small rectangular ponds in the centre of the garden were filled in, while other ponds were reshaped from angular geometric designs into more natural meandering outlines. The garden was decorated with flower beds and flowering shrubs, with picturesque groups of trees supplementing the plantings along the pathways. In the north of the garden, on the banks of the Moyka and on the site of Catherine's Golden Mansion, Rossi designed a pavilion and pier intended "for romantic meetings on summer evenings over a cup of tea or playing cards". Rossi himself designed a cast iron bridge across the ponds, and the railings for the pier, which were cast by the Aleksandrovsky Iron Foundry. By the 1830s Sadovaya Street was extended along the east side of the garden, from which it was separated by an ornamental fence.

During the imperial period the garden was a private space and closed to citizens. Grand Duke Michael's wife, Grand Duchess Elena Pavlovna, took chief responsibility for the palace and garden, and the spaces were used to host events, horseback riding and balls. During this period the nickname "Elena Pavlovna's Garden" became popular among the city's residents. A 1839 description of one of the Grand Duchess's balls recorded that "During the ball, the garden and the palace were turned into a kind of exhibition of Saint Petersburg gardening. All the flowers from the Pavlovsk and Oranienbaum greenhouses were brought to the ball via the pier of the Mikhailovsky Garden on two hundred carts. Everything in the palace was blossoming and fragrant ... From the garden shone a fantastic illumination, with a wonderful view of the Field of Mars and the Neva".

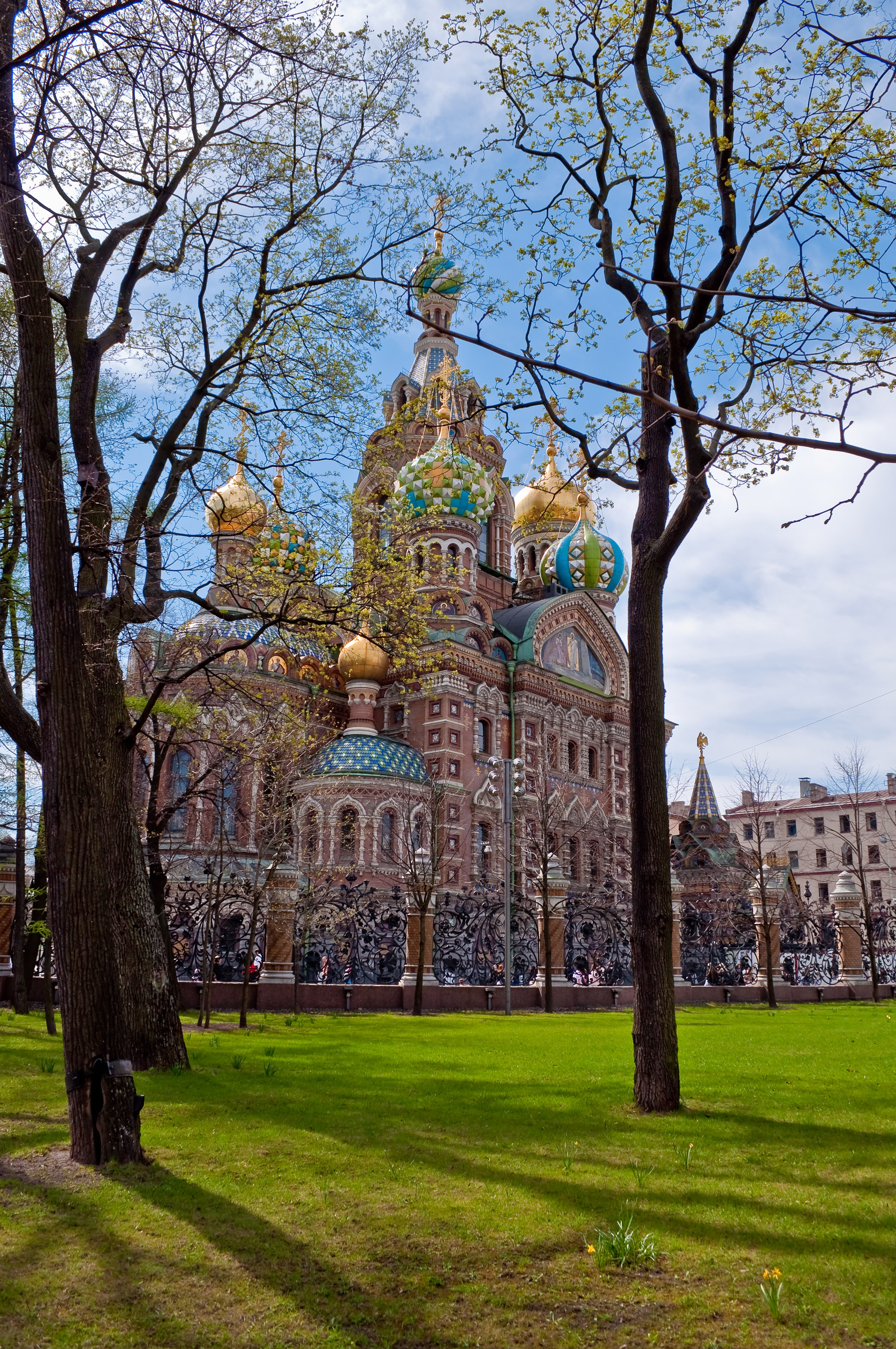
The Church of the Saviour on Blood, built on the garden's western side, and the Art Nouveau-style fence which separates it from the garden

On 1 March 1881, Emperor Alexander II was assassinated by members of Narodnaya Volya while travelling along the Catherine Canal embankment beside the Mikhailovsky Garden. In memory of his father the new emperor, Alexander III, ordered the building of the Church of the Saviour on Blood on the site of the assassination. The church took up part the western edge of the garden, and was separated from it by an Art Nouveau-style fence designed by Alfred Parland and created by Karl Vinkler between 1903 and 1907. By 1898 the palace had ceased to be a grand ducal residence, and was bought back by the state for use as the home of the Museum of Emperor Alexander III, now the Russian Museum. Both the palace and garden were opened to the public, though a sign on the entrance forbade entry to dogs and soldiers. The redevelopment of the palace complex in the early 1900s, with the construction of the museum's ethnographic department, reduced the size of the garden slightly, while in 1902 the eastern pond was filled in.

=== Soviet park ===
In 1918 the garden was designated a monument of landscape art by the early Soviet state, and in 1922, during the early Soviet period, the garden was named after the International Organization of Assistance to Revolutionary Fighters (Russian: Междунаро́дная организа́ция по́мощи борца́м револю́ции (МОПР)), but was otherwise in decline. By now designated a city park, some repair work was carried out in 1924 with the planting of new trees, the cleaning of the pond, and maintenance work on the fence along Sadovaya Street. Also that year paths were built across the meadow, and new pavilions and stages erected for exhibitions. However the garden sustained damage in heavy flooding in November 1924. In 1939 a children's playground and public toilets were built. During the siege of Leningrad efforts were made to protect some of the city's monuments by burying them in open spaces. Several, including the equestrian statue of Alexander III, were buried in the Mikhailovsky Garden. The garden suffered from the heavy bombing and shelling the city received during the Second World War, which destroyed trees and left craters in the grounds. Restoration work took place in 1949, in 1957 the railings of the pier were restored, and in 1959 a bust of sculptor Fedot Shubin was installed on the meadow. During the later Soviet period tree and bush planting was carried out in a haphazard fashion, and the view across the Field of Mars to the Neva became obstructed.

=== Post-Soviet period ===
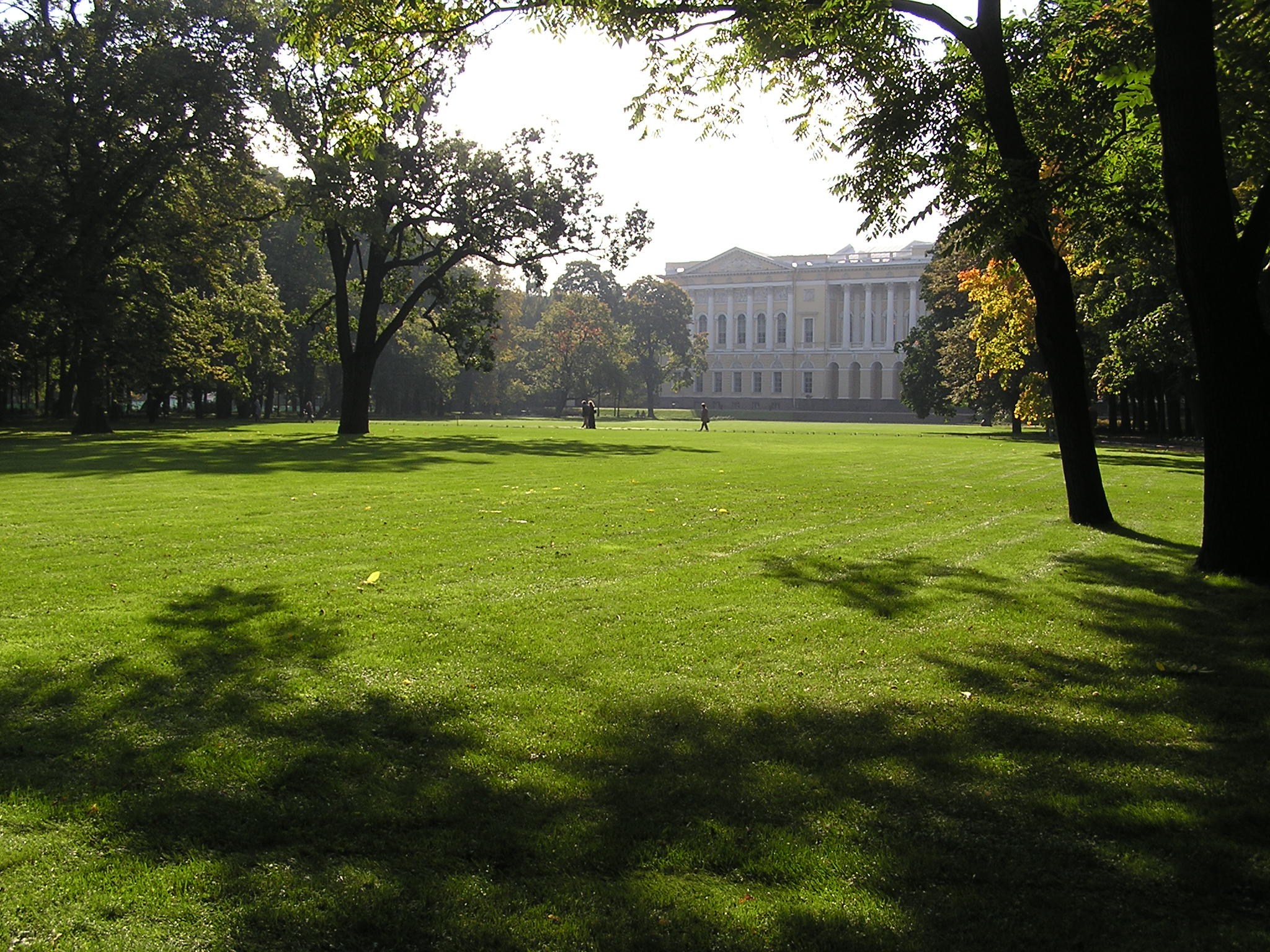
View across the meadow to the garden facade of the Mikhailovsky Palace

In 1999 the garden was transferred to the Russian Museum, which commissioned an inspection of the state of the grounds. The report in 2000 revealed the extensive damage done to the original design of the ensemble, and a plan was drawn up the following year by the State Institute for Architecture for the restoration of the garden. Work was then carried out between 2002 and 2004, restoring the gardens to the original Rossi designs. Some of the artworks that had been placed in the garden, such as A. P. Solovyov's "Tree of Freedom", and the bust of Shubin, were removed. A bust of Rossi was placed in the Rossi Pavilion, while busts of Karl Bryullov, and Alexander Ivanov were installed in the grounds of the garden. As restored, the garden preserves the English landscape style in its centre, and the French formal style around its edges. On 10 July 2001 the garden and its ensemble were designated as objects "of historical and cultural heritage of federal significance." Since 2008 the garden has hosted the International "Imperial Gardens of Russia" Festival annually in late May and early June. The festival is an exhibition and competition of landscape and garden-park art.
