= Mikhailovsky Palace =

Palace in Saint Petersburg, Russia

Coordinates: 59°56′19″N 30°19′56″E

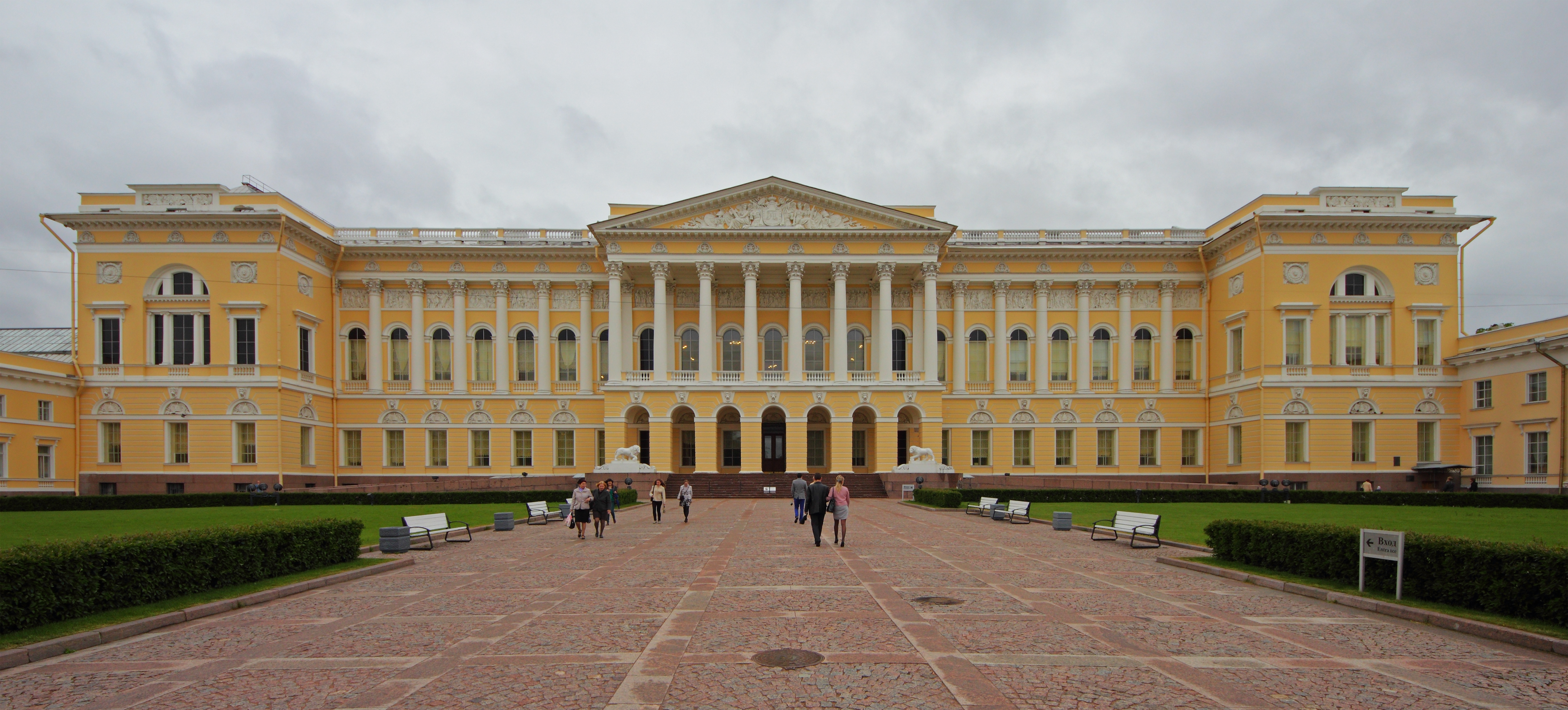
The Mikhailovsky Palace as it appears today

The Mikhailovsky Palace (Russian: Михайловский дворец, romanized: Mikhailovskiy dvorets) is a grand ducal palace in Saint Petersburg, Russia. It is located on Arts Square and is an example of Empire style neoclassicism. The palace currently houses the main building of the Russian Museum and displays its collections of early, folk, eighteenth, and nineteenth century art.

It was originally planned as the residence of Grand Duke Michael Pavlovich, the youngest son of Emperor Paul I. Work had not yet begun on the Mikhailovsky Palace, when Paul was overthrown and killed in a palace coup that brought Michael's elder brother to the throne as Alexander I. The new emperor resurrected the idea for a new palace by the time Michael was 22, and plans were drawn up by Carlo Rossi to develop a new site in Saint Petersburg. The palace, built in the neoclassic style, became the centrepiece of an ensemble that took in new streets and squares. It was lavishly decorated, with the interiors costing more than the main construction work. It was gifted to Grand Duke Michael and his new wife, Grand Duchess Elena Pavlovna, by the Emperor in 1825. The grand ducal family had comfortable apartments furnished to their individual tastes. Grand Duke Michael carried out some of his military duties there, while his wife hosted salons that brought together many of the leading members of Saint Petersburg society and culture. The Grand Duchess continued this lifestyle after her husband's death in 1849, until her own death in 1873. The palace was passed on to the couple's daughter, Grand Duchess Catherine Mikhailovna.

Over the years of their residency, the family renovated and refurbished the palace's rooms in keeping with contemporary tastes. By the time of Grand Duchess Catherine's death in 1894, the staterooms were no longer in regular use—the family resided for the most part in the palace's wings. With the death of the Grand Duchess, the palace was inherited by her children, who were members of the family of the Dukes of Mecklenburg-Strelitz. Concerned about the palace passing out of the Romanov family, Emperor Alexander III decided to buy it back for the state. He died before this could be arranged, but the negotiations were carried out on behalf of his son Emperor Nicholas II, by Minister of Finance Sergei Witte. Nicholas gave it to the newly established Russian Museum, in honour of his father, with the remit that it collect and display domestic art. The palace was extensively renovated to fit its new role, with some of the interiors retained. One wing was demolished and rebuilt, later becoming the Russian Museum of Ethnography, while a new extension, the Benois wing, was added in the 1910s.

== History ==
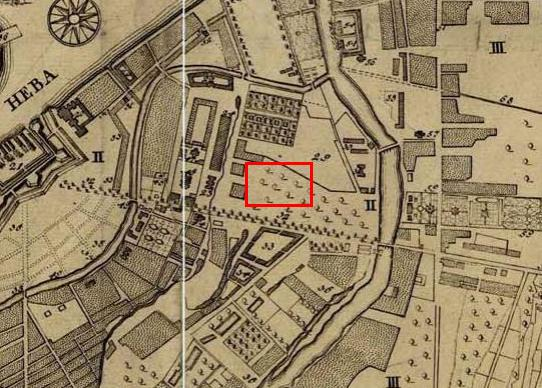
The future site of the palace, shown on a 1737 map

The palace was designed as a residence for Grand Duke Michael Pavlovich, youngest son of Emperor Paul I. At Paul's order, several hundred thousand rubles were to be set aside annually for the construction of the palace from 1798 onwards. In 1801, Paul was overthrown and killed in a palace coup, and his heir ascended to the throne as Alexander I. The new emperor decided to carry out his father's wishes and gave his approval to the construction of the new palace when Michael was 21. By this time some 9 million rubles had been accumulated. The designs were drawn up by Carlo Rossi in 1817. At first the site of the Vorontsov Palace was proposed and then the site of the Chernyshev residence, which later became the site of the Mariinsky Palace. Both options were rejected by Alexander I as being unnecessarily expensive and complex, instead selecting a new site in the city centre for development.

The site eventually chosen was a space that had previously seen little development, between the confluence of the Fontanka and Moyka Rivers, the Griboyedov Canal and Nevsky Prospect. It had been used as garden and hunting space, with Empress Elizabeth's Summer Palace, and later Emperor Paul's Mikhailovsky Castle being located nearby. Rossi set out to develop a new architectural ensemble, which would include not only a new palace, but a square and two new streets, Inzhenernaya and Mikhailovskaya. Two existing streets, Sadovaya and Italyanskaya, were to be extended and included in the overall architectural ensemble.

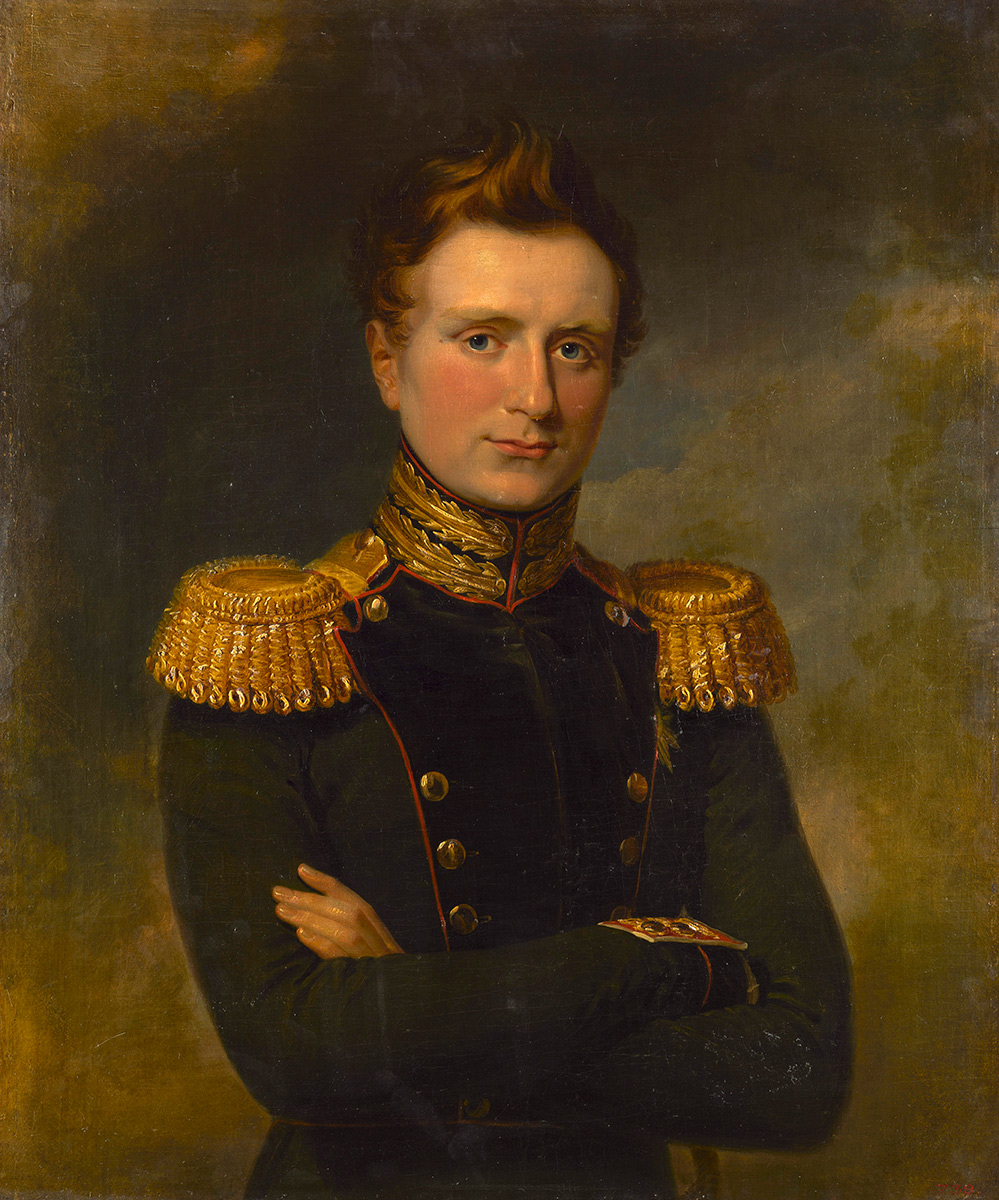
Grand Duke Michael Pavlovich, for whom the palace was built

In early April 1819, the "Commission for the construction of the palace of Grand Duke Mikhail Pavlovich" was created. The ceremonial laying of the foundation took place in summer that year, with construction beginning on 26 July.^{[a]} Architect Adam Menelaws also laid out a garden for the palace overlooking the Field of Mars, which became known as the Mikhailovsky Garden. The masonry was the responsibility of Foma Adamini, Domenico Adamini and Iosif Bernadazzi. As was common with Russian building projects, construction work was only carried out in the warm seasons to ensure the work was reliable and durable, while the winter was spent collecting building materials and working on designs and calculations.

The main core of the palace was built between 1819 and 1820, with the wings added the following year; by the end of 1822 the bulk of the construction was finished. The interior designs and decorations were completed over the next two years. Grand Duke Michael married Princess Charlotte of Württemberg, who took the name Elena Pavlovna, in February 1824, and by the middle of the following year the work on the palace was largely completed. Emperor Alexander I visited the new palace and declared himself extremely pleased with the result, bestowing a diamond ring and the Order of Saint Vladimir Third Class order on Rossi. Rossi also received a plot of land for the construction of his own house. The palace was officially completed on 11 September [O.S. 30 August] 1825, when the Emperor presented it to Grand Duke Michael and his heirs in perpetuity. Its construction had taken six years, at the expense of 7,875,000 rubles. Of this sum approximately 4 million rubles, more than half the total cost, was spent on its decoration. A grand banquet was held to mark the occasion, with Alexander departing the following day for his journey to the south, where he died. Grand Duke Michael and his new wife moved into their new home from their apartments at the Winter Palace.

== Design ==
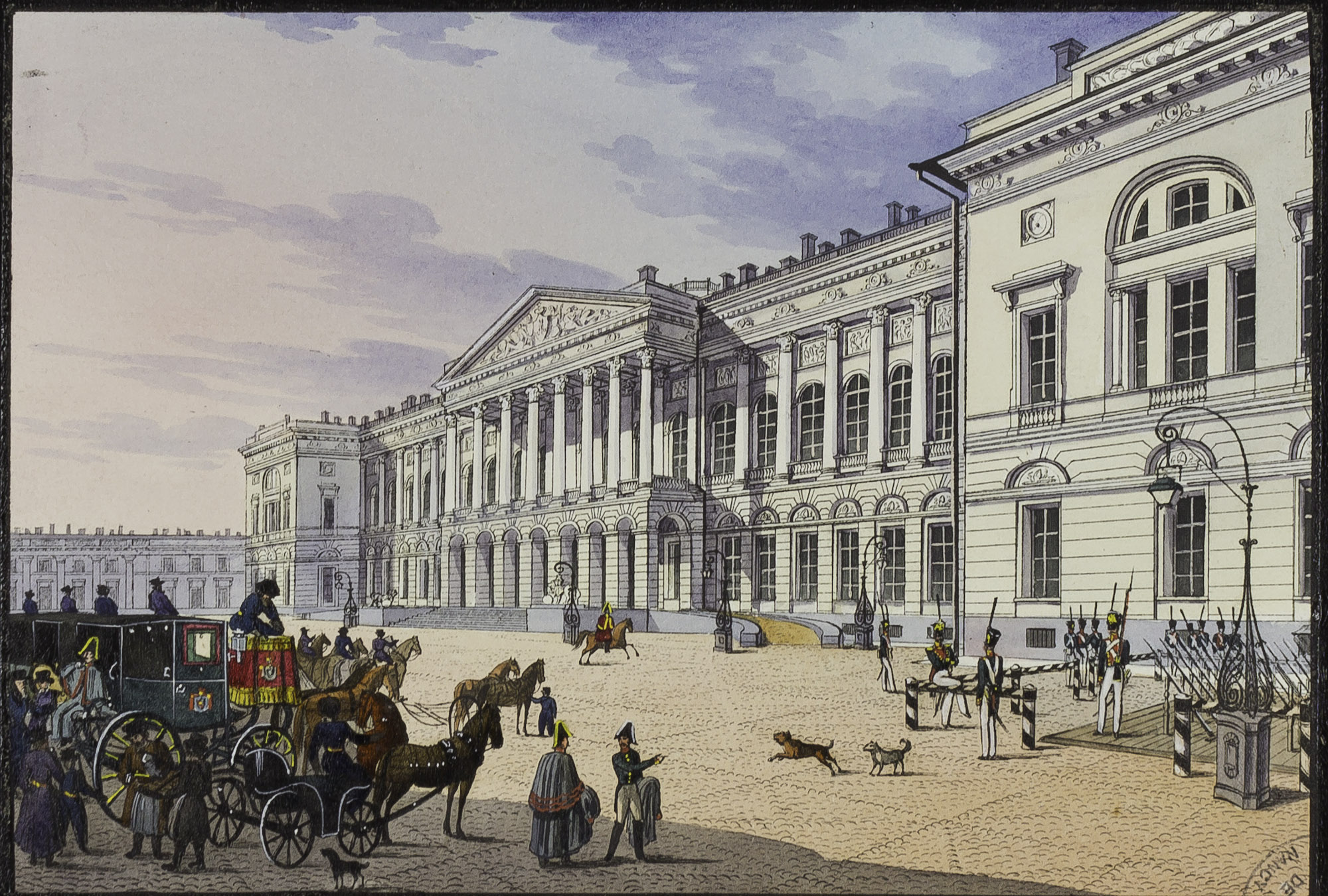
An early view of the palace's neoclassical facade

The palace consists of a central block with two wings, housing the service spaces. The western wing was termed the Freylinskiy wing, or the ladies-in-waiting wing, and the eastern, the Manezhny wing, or the riding hall wing. A separate outbuilding by the Manezhny wing was used for stables, with another outbuilding, the Laundry House, placed at the corner of Inzhenernaya and Sadovaya streets. The palace faced Mikhailovsky Square, now Arts Square. Its facade consists of a rusticated lower floor below the piano nobile portico, a loggia with a three-quarter eight-columned Corinthian colonnade supporting a triangular pediment with armour decorations by Stepan Pimenov and Vasily Demut-Malinovsky. The entrance staircase is flanked by two Medici lions, specially cast for the palace in 1824. The arches and windows of the first floor are decorated with stone lion heads. The facade facing the Mikhailovsky Garden consists of a large loggia-colonnade, while Corinthian colonnades decorate the building's wings.

The lower floor contains the private apartments, the first floor held the official suites, ballrooms and staterooms. There was a house chapel to the Archangel Michael in the south-east corner of the mezzanine floor and kitchens on the ground floor. The entryway leads into a large vestibule with a bas-reliefs, a Corinthian colonnade, plafond and skylight. The design of the palace became internationally renowned and respected. After hearing reports from his ambassador to Russia, Granville Leveson-Gower, 1st Earl Granville, King George IV of the United Kingdom asked the Russian emperor for a model of the palace. One was duly built by Nikolai Tarasov, measuring two metres in length and two in width, which was delivered to the king by Tarasov's brother Ivan.

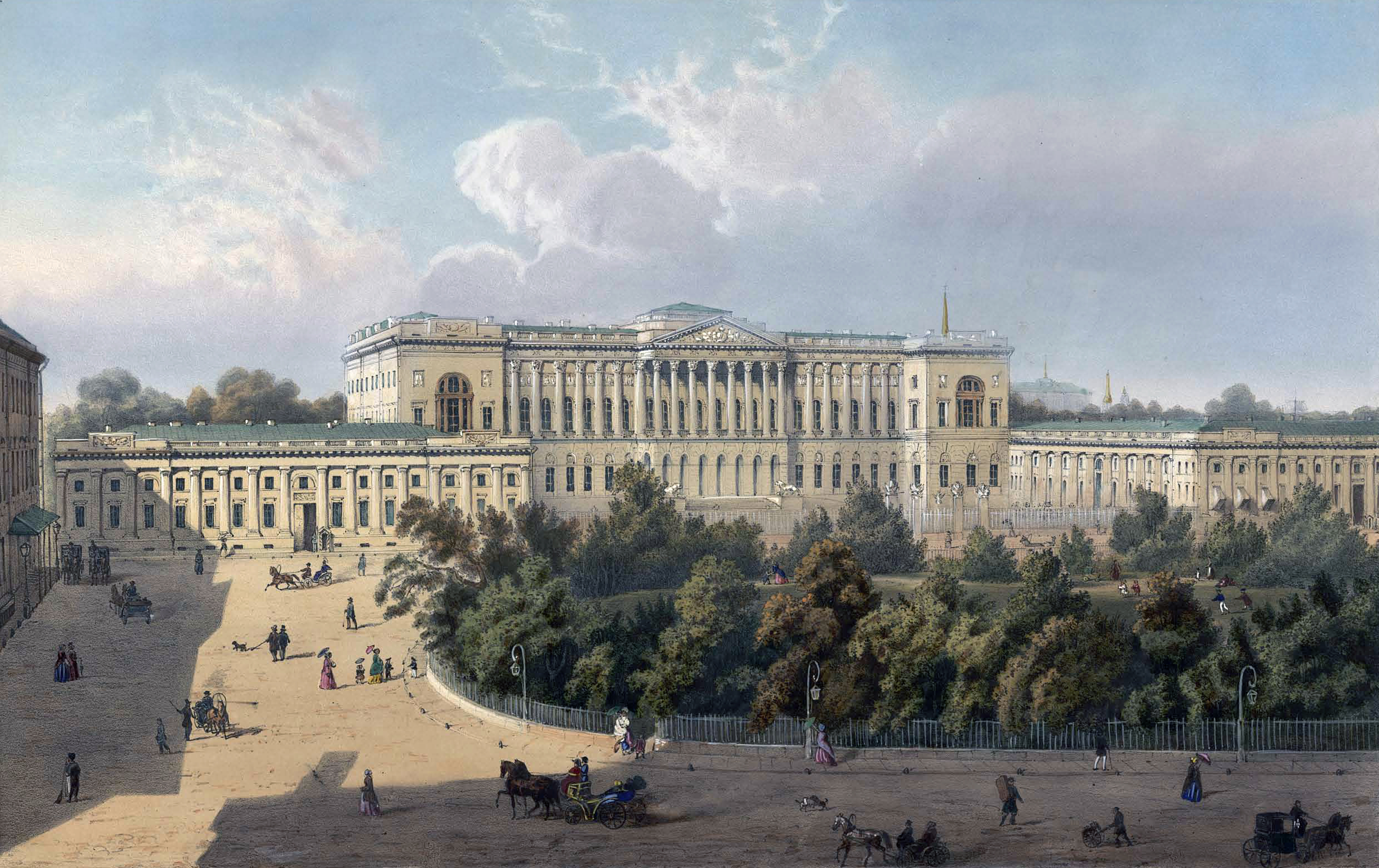
The palace in the nineteenth century, with Mikhailovskaya Square in the foreground

The Blue Gallery was entered through a doorway flanked with caryatides by Stepan Pimenov, which led on to the large dining room, with a vaulted ceiling with grisaille coffers. The passageway led through a marble-decorated dancing Hall to the sitting rooms, and then the staterooms. While those of Grand Duchess Elena were particularly luxurious, the staterooms of Grand Duke Michael were more spartan. Ambassador Leveson-Gower wrote that "The only place the Grand Duke allowed splendour and luxury was in a rich and varied collection of weapons, armour, helmets, equipment, artillery and other guns in perfect condition." Albert Nikolayevitch Benois noted that "In the [Grand Duke's] Study and Library were collections of rare books, gravures, numismatics, lots of magnificent art ... The walls of the hall were hung all over with trophies, mostly sabres, swords, banners, canvases of military subjects and portraits". Among the trophies were the three cannons which had played an important role during the accession crisis of 1825, when they were used to clear the Decembrists from Peter's Square. They were gifted to the Grand Duke by his brother, Emperor Nicholas I.

== Life at the palace ==
The elaborate and richly decorated staterooms

Grand Duke Michael maintained close contact with his military life, often hosting commissions at the palace, and holding audiences with military personnel seeking posts. The servants were often military veterans, and for a time Major-General Dmitry Vasilchikov of the Patriotic War of 1812 lived at the palace. Grand Duke Michael died in 1849, with the palace passing to his widow, Grand Duchess Elena Pavlovna. She became famous as a salon hostess, with her guests including poets Alexander Pushkin, Fyodor Tyutchev and Vasily Zhukovsky. She acted as a patron for artists such as Alexander Ivanov, Karl Bryullov and Ivan Aivazovsky. Another guest was Nicholas Miklouho-Maclay, who, with the help of Elena Pavlovna and Anton Rubinstein, established the Russian Musical Society and the Saint Petersburg Conservatory. Classes of the Society and Conservatory sometimes took place in the palace. Thursdays became the day when statesmen, scientists, writers, and artists came to meet at the palace. Otto von Bismarck was one attendee, while serving as the Prussian envoy to Russia, and at times Emperor Nicholas I visited, as did his successor Emperor Alexander II and his wife, Maria Alexandrovna. She was also renowned at hosting balls at the palace, the equal to those of the Imperial family. The Marquis de Custine recalled that

"Grand Duchess Elena for each of the festivities she arranges, invents, as I was told, something new, original, not familiar to anyone ... Groups of trees, illuminated from above with a covered light, made a fascinating impression ... One and a half thousand tubs and pots with the rarest flowers formed a fragrant bouquet ... Luxurious palm trees, banana trees and all sorts of other tropical plants, whose roots were hidden under a carpet of greenery, seemed to grow in their native soil, and it seemed that the procession of dancing couples had been transferred from the wild north to a distant tropical forest ... It is difficult to imagine the magnificence of this picture. The idea of where you are is completely lost. All boundaries disappeared, everything was full of light, gold, colors, reflections and an enchanting, magical illusion ... This palace seemed to be created for festivity ... I have never seen anything more beautiful anywhere."

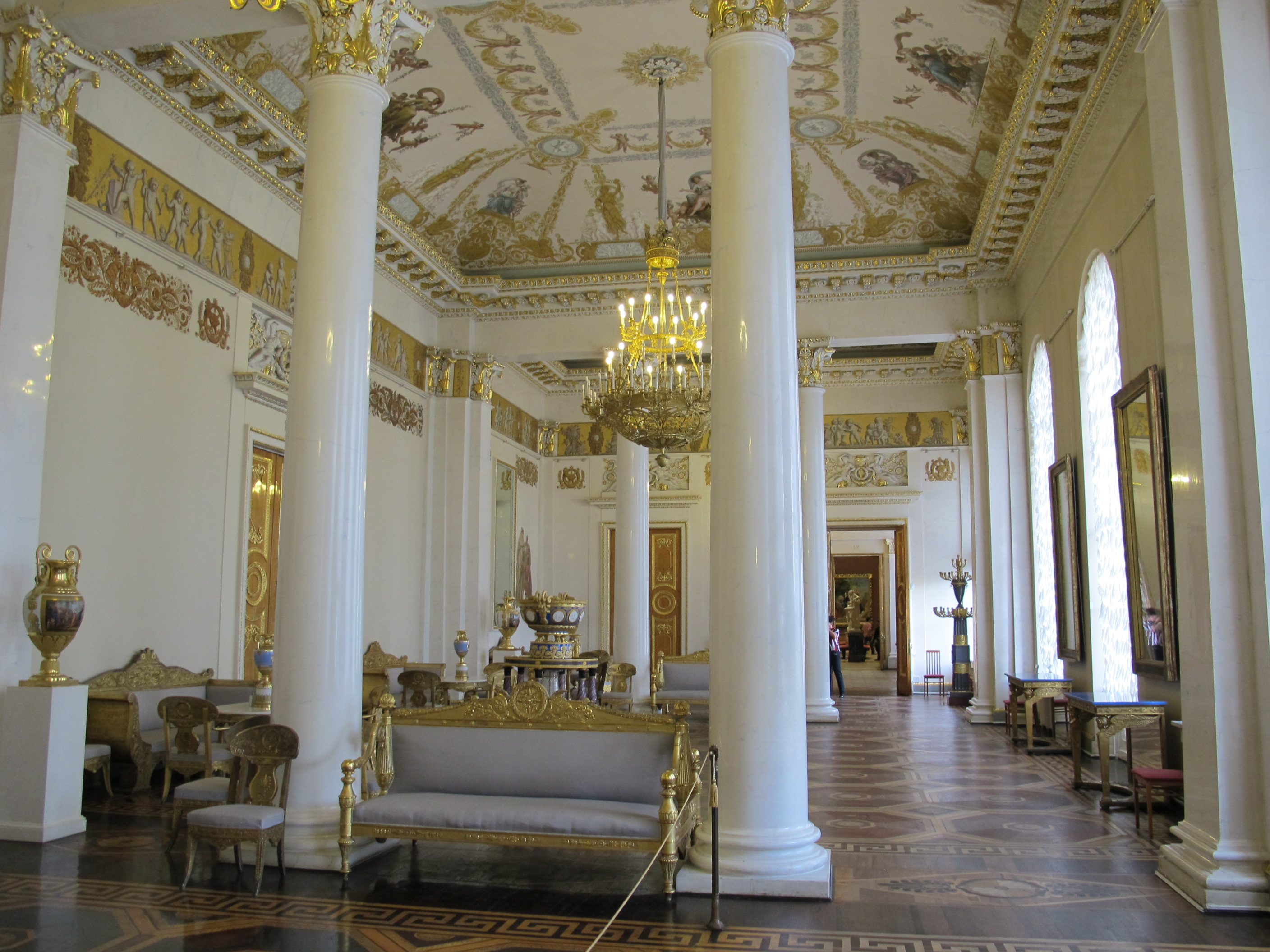
The White Hall, one of the surviving Rossi interiors

The Grand Duke's suite remained unaltered during his lifetime, though in the 1830s, Grand Duchess Elena ordered the reconstruction of her suite by Andrei Stackenschneider, in keeping with contemporary styles. The smaller staterooms were also updated over the period of her occupancy. Several famous architects were employed at different periods to carry out this work—Harald Julius von Bosse remodelled two sitting rooms and two studies of the Grand Duchess's suite in the 1840-50s, Ludwig Bohnstedt redeveloped the rooms of the couple's daughter, Grand Duchess Catherine Mikhailovna in 1850; Aleksandr Yurkevich remodelled the palace's Upper Church in 1857 and Robert Goedike the music room in 1863. Georg Preiss was appointed as architect for the palace in 1859, while I. Jogansson and Veniamin Stukkei fulfilled several commissions in the 1870s. Grand Duchess Elena died in 1873, and the palace passed to her third daughter, Grand Duchess Catherine Mikhailovna, who had married Duke Georg August of Mecklenburg-Strelitz. A new suite of eight rooms for Grand Duchess Catherine Mikhailovna and her daughter Helena was built in 1865 in the Manezhny wing, which became the main residence of the Grand Duchess Catherine until her death in April 1894. Catherine Mikhailovna's staterooms and the Freylinskiy had been renovated after Grand Duchess Elena's death. Preiss retired in 1888, passing his duties on to his son Konstantin. By the early 1890s the ducal family resided mostly in the wings of the palace, with the main staterooms largely unoccupied.

With the death of Grand Duchess Catherine Mikhailovna on 30 April 1894, the palace passed to her children, Georg, Mikhail and Helena, Dukes and Duchesses of Mecklenburg-Strelitz. This created a political quandary as while the children were technically subjects of the Duchy of Mecklenburg-Strelitz, the Mikhailovsky Palace was intended to be a possession of the Romanov family. Emperor Alexander III decided to buy the palace at public expense and establish the Kseniinsky Institute there, after his daughter, Grand Duchess Xenia Alexandrovna. Alexander died suddenly in 1894 before this could be carried, and it was his son and successor as Emperor Nicholas II who instructed Minister of Finance Sergei Witte to arrange the purchase of the Mikhailovsky Palace. A sum of four million rubles was agreed upon, and on 20 January 1895 the palace passed back into the hands of the Romanovs. The departing family was allowed to take some of the decorations relating to the family history, as a result of which, many of the chandeliers, doors and fireplaces were removed.

== Creation of the museum ==
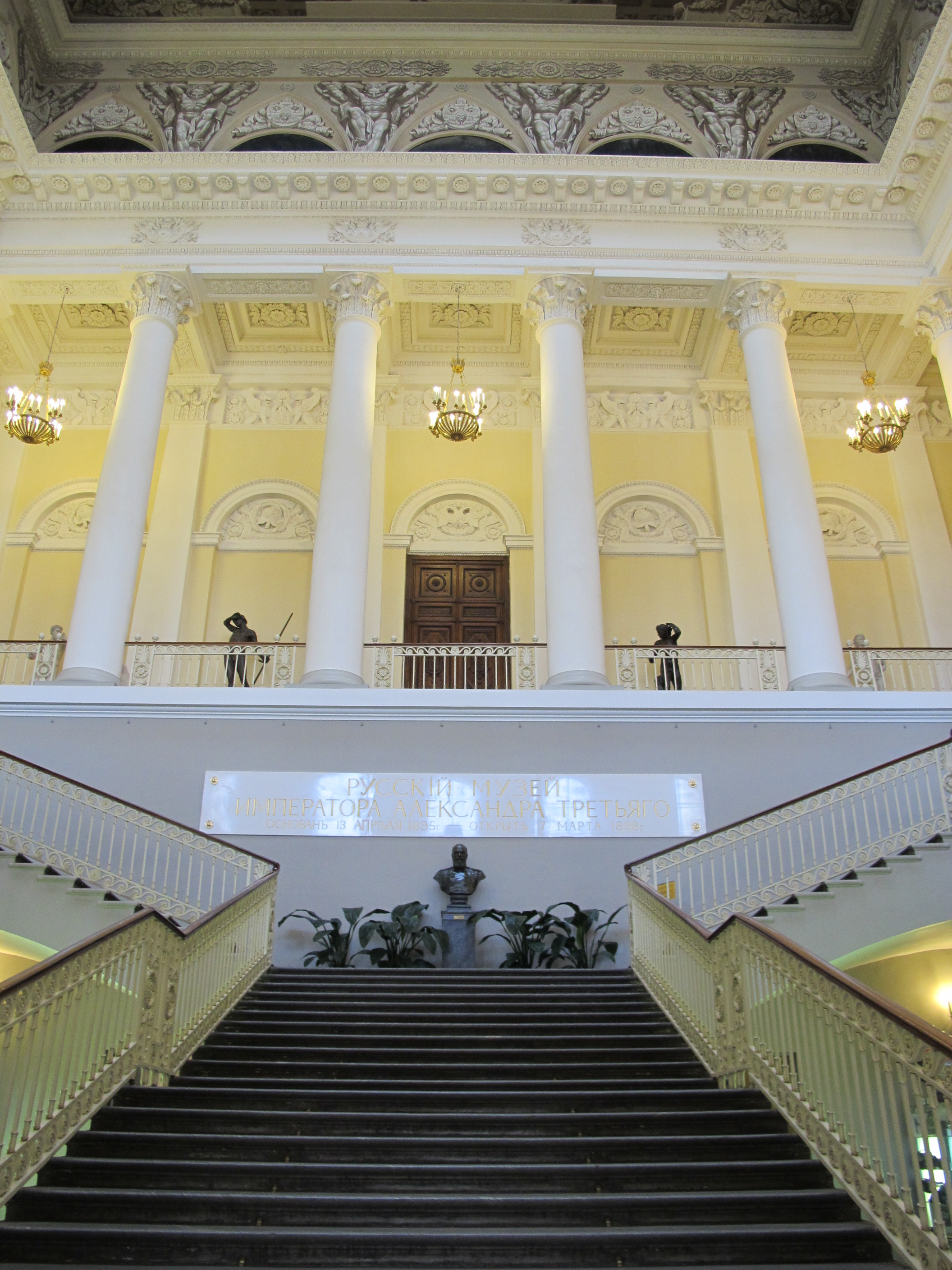
The entrance vestibule and grand staircase of the palace, with a bust and plaque to Emperor Alexander III

Witte suggested that Nicholas II might take up occupancy in the Mikhailovsky Palace, though Nicholas preferred to stay in the Winter Palace. Meanwhile, the proposed Kseniinsky Institute had already taken possession of the Nicholas Palace. Witte then suggested that the Mikhailovsky Palace would make a suitable home for a museum of Russian art in honour of Emperor Alexander III, which Nicholas agreed to. By this time the Hermitage held the works of mostly foreign artists, with only a single room allotted for domestic art. It was decided to establish a new institution dedicated to Russian art, and by personal decree on 13 April [O.S. 25 April] 1895 Nicholas II established the "Russian Museum of Emperor Alexander III" and placed the Mikhailovsky Palace complex in its possession. The museum was placed under the supervision of Grand Duke George Mikhailovich, with a committee established under Professor Mikhail Botkin to oversee the reconstruction of the palace into a museum by architect Vasily Svinin of the Imperial Academy of Arts.

The reconstruction produced considerable changes to the palace's interior. Doorways were heightened, some were blocked off, and new passageways were created. Fireplaces, mantelpieces and mirrors were removed, as were wall paintings and mouldings, and smaller rooms were combined to create larger exhibitions spaces. The dance hall and large theatre were completely reworked, with windows being filled in and replaced with skylights. Few of Rossi's interiors were retained, though the reconstruction was carried out in the neoclassic style to fit with the original designs. Concrete ceilings were also fitted to protect against attic fires, and the central heating system was overhauled, as well as measures to improve the ventilation and water supply. The main building work was completed by spring 1896, after which work began on the interiors, which involved artists N. Blinov, N. Budakov, A. Boravsky; sculptors Amandus Adamson, and cabinetmaker S. Volkovisky. The committee made a final examination of the work on 28 February 1898, and pronounced themselves entirely satisfied. The museum officially opened on 7 March 1898.

=== Benois wing ===
A detached building was constructed between the Freylinskiy wing and the Griboyedov Canal between 1910 and 1912 by architects Leon Benois and Sergei Ovsyannikov, for temporary art exhibitions. It was founded on 27 June 1914, but work was suspended for the duration of the First World War, and was only completed in 1919. It was transferred to the Russian Museum in the early 1930s, and in November 1941, during the Siege of Leningrad, the building was struck by two high-explosive bombs. A statue of Alexander III that stood in the palace courtyard was also hit by a bomb during the war, but had been covered with sand and logs, and escaped damage. Restoration work was carried out between 1947 and 1963. In 1958, a passage was built linking it to the Freylinskiy wing, by now termed the Rossi wing.

== The palace today ==
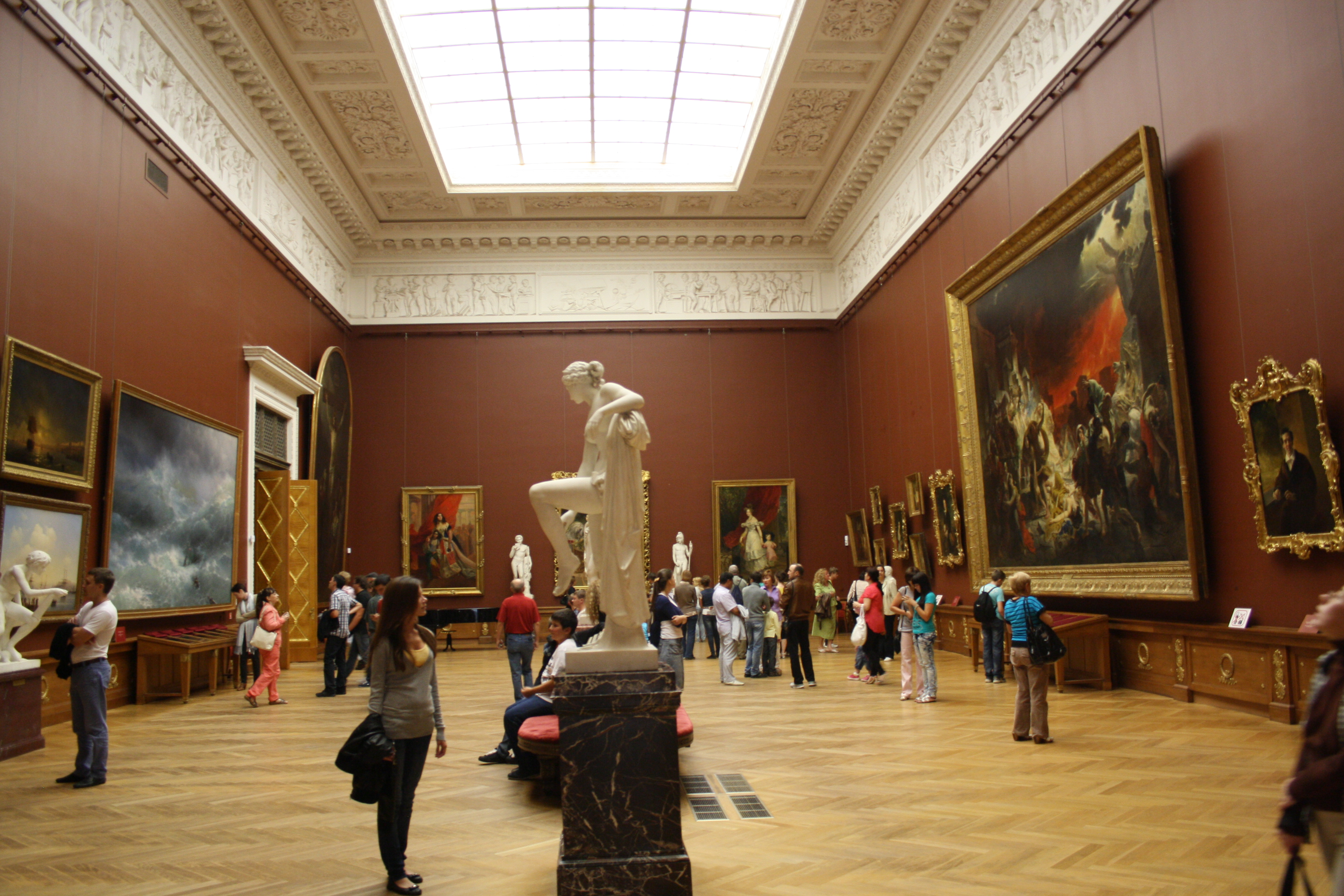
The palace as a museum. Paintings by Ivan Aivazovsky at left, and The Last Day of Pompeii by Karl Bryullov at right

The Mikhailovsky Palace houses the main building of the Russian Museum and is used to display its collections of early artworks, and those from the eighteenth and nineteenth centuries. Entrance and exits are through the lower floor, which contains the ticket offices, cloakrooms, shops, cafe, and other visitor facilities. The Rossi wing, the former Freylinskiy wing, displays nineteenth century art, and examples of Russian folk art. Twentieth century art and temporary exhibitions are displayed in the Benois wing. The former Manezhny wing was demolished by Vasily Svinin, with a new building constructed between 1900 and 1911, which now houses the Russian Museum of Ethnography, initially the Russian Museum's department of ethnography, but established as a separate museum in 1934. Between 2000 and 2002 the original decoration of the palace church was recreated.

== See also ==
- Saint Michael's Castle, constructed in 1797–1801 as a residence for Emperor Paul I.
- New Michael Palace, constructed in 1857–1861, also known as New Michael Place, an eclectic palace on the Palace Embankment, designed by Andrei Shtakenschneider for Grand Duke Mikhail Nikolayevich of Russia.

== Notes ==
a. Two dates have been identified for the laying of the foundation stone: 17 April in The River Moyka Flows by Georgy Zuev and 14 July in Great Architects of Saint Petersburg by Yuri Ovsyannikov.
