= Carlo Rossi (architect) =

Italian architect (1775–1849)

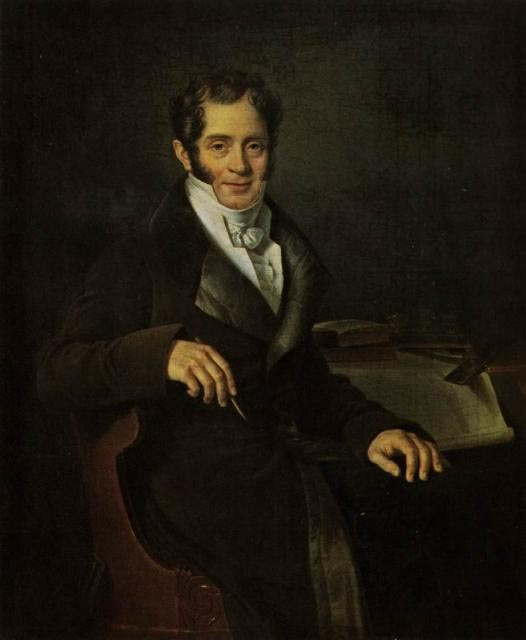
- Portrait by B. S. Mityar, 1820
- Born: Carlo di Giovanni Rossi; 18 December 1775; Naples, Kingdom of Naples
- Died: 6 April 1849; Saint Petersburg, Russian Empire
- Known for: Architecture
- Movement: Neoclassicism

Carlo di Giovanni Rossi (Russian: Карл Иванович Росси, romanized: Karl Ivanovich Rossi; 29 December [O.S. 18 December] 1775 – 18 April [O.S. 6 April] 1849) was an Italian architect, whose most notable work was in early-19th-century Imperial Russia. He was the author of many classical buildings and architectural ensembles in Saint Petersburg and its environs.

== Biography ==
Carlo Rossi was born 29 December [O.S. 18 December] 1775 in Naples (his stepfather was the famous ballet artist Charles Le Picq) and was brought to Russia in his childhood when his mother Guertroude Rossi-Le Picq, a well-known ballerina, was invited to Russia to perform. From youth he was connected with the world of the arts. He trained in the studio of architect Vincenzo Brenna. In 1795 he entered the service of the admiralty board of architecture; as the assistant to Brenna, together with whom, it is assumed, he participated in the construction of Saint Michael's Castle in Saint Petersburg. From 1802 to 1803 Rossi studied in Italy. In 1806, he obtained the title of architect and an office. In 1808, he was dispatched to the Kremlin archaeological expedition in Moscow, where he built St. Catherine's Church of the Ascension Convent and the theatre at Arbat Square, which burned to the ground during Napoleon's invasion of Russia. He was rewarded with the Order of St. Vladimir of IV degree. In 1814, he obtained the rank of Collegiate Councillor. In 1815, he returned to Saint Petersburg. In 1816, he was appointed to a position on the committee of structures and hydraulic works.

The buildings of Rossi are characteristic of the empire style, which combines grandeur with noble simplicity. These include: the Yelagin Palace with the hothouse and the pavilions (1816–1818), the Mikhailovsky Palace, General Staff Building, the buildings of the Senate and Synod (1829–1833), the façade of the Russian National Library that faces Alexandrinskaya Square, the pavilions of Anichkov Palace, the arch of the General Staff Building, the Alexandrine Theatre and the buildings of the Board of Theaters and Ministry of Internal Affairs. In Pavlovsk, Rossi built the palace library. One of Rossi's last buildings was the belfry of the Yurevskogo monastery near Velikiy Novgorod.

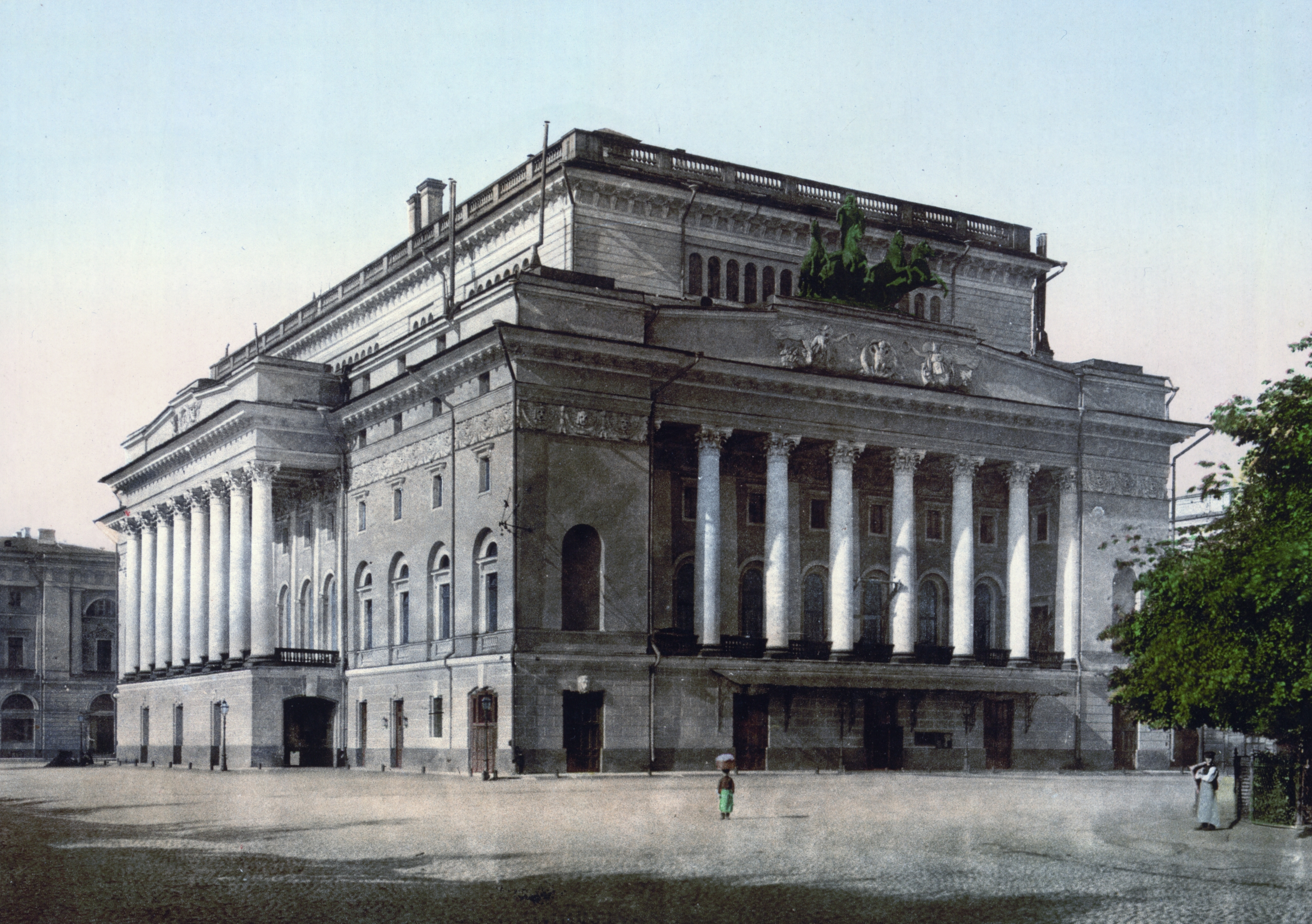
Alexandrine Theatre in Saint Petersburg.

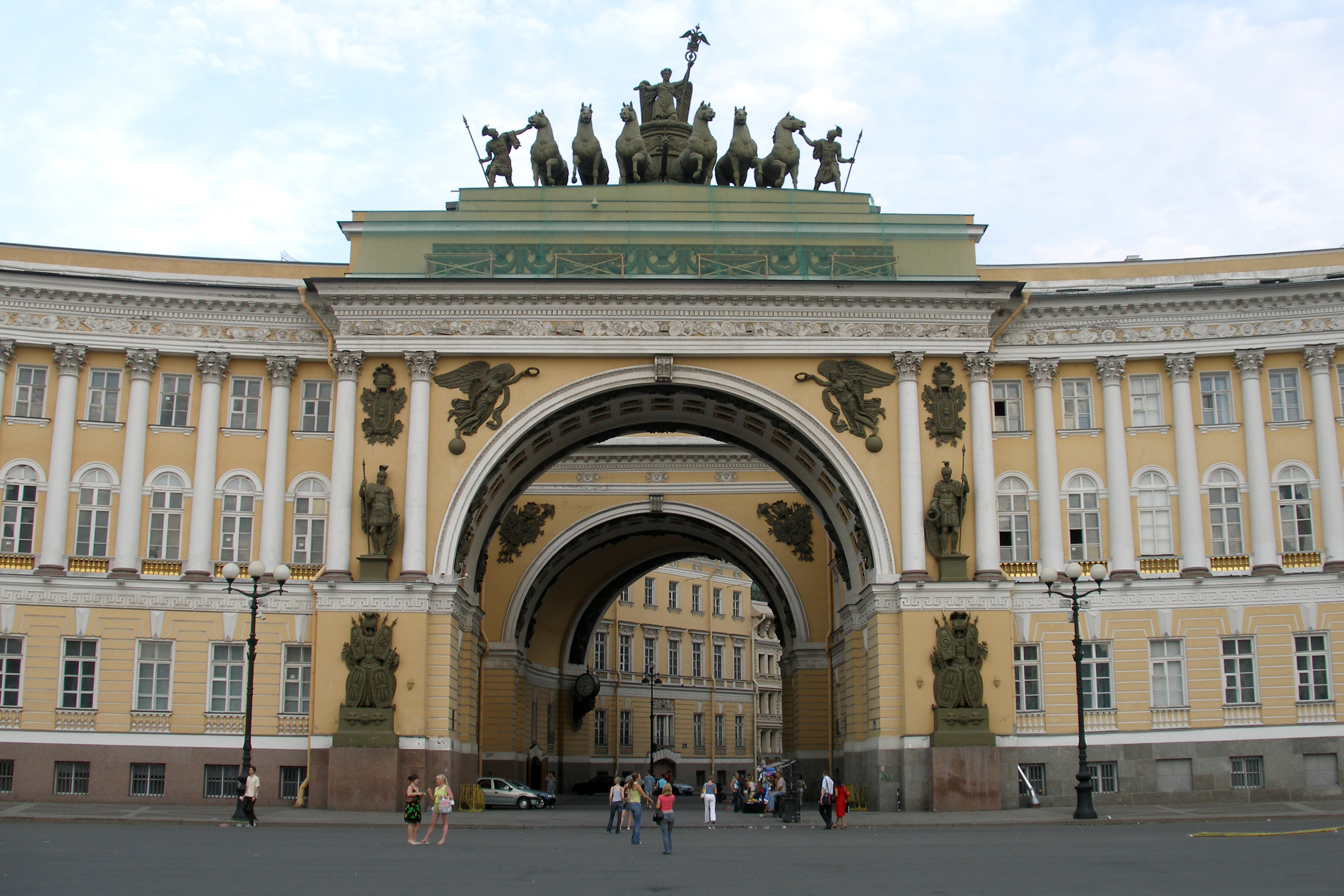
Arch of the General Staff Building in Palace Square, by Carlo Rossi.

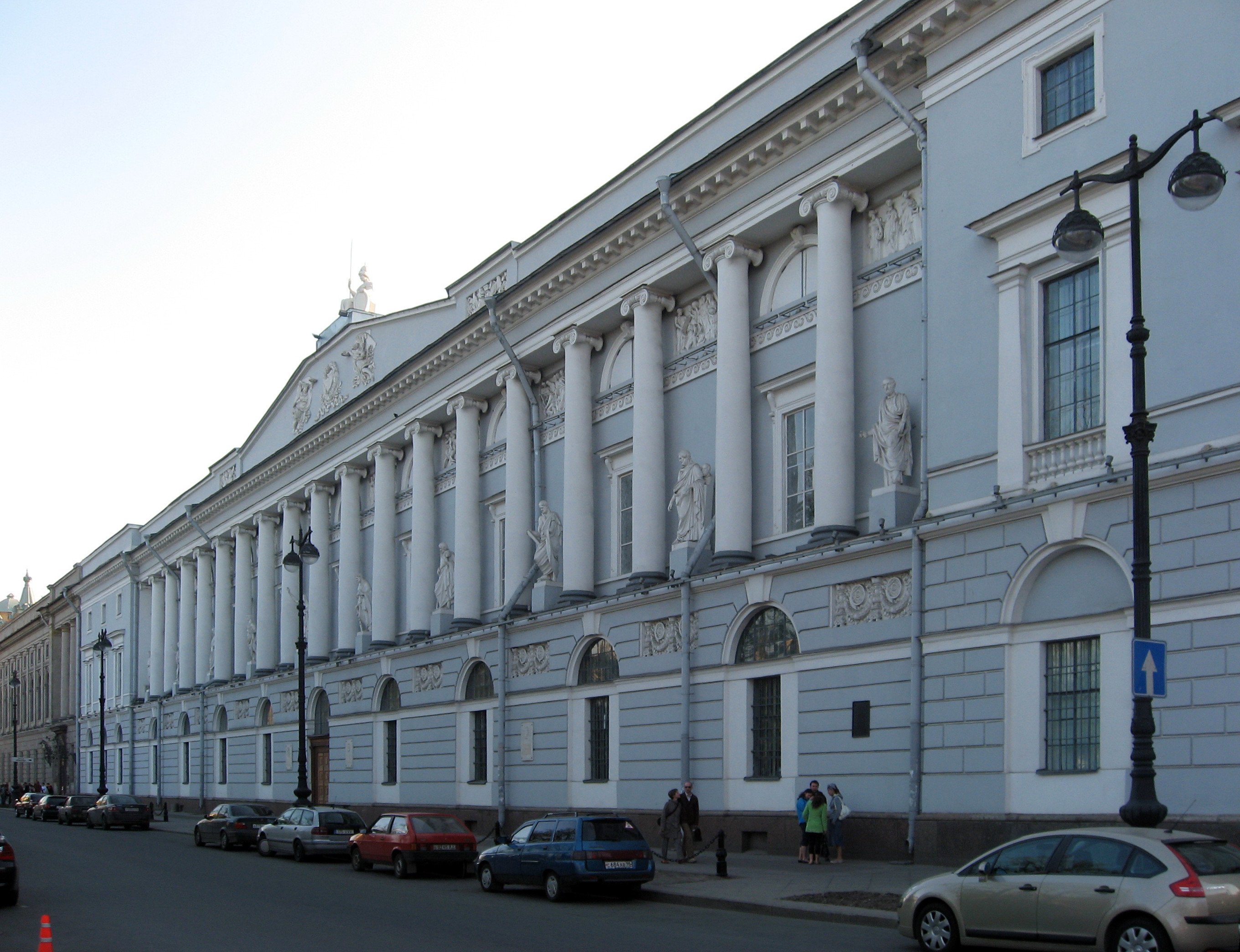
Russian National Library

On 18 April [O.S. 6 April] 1849, he died of cholera in Saint Petersburg, according to available data - in complete oblivion and in poverty. His children were left with the responsibilities of his burial and debts, which they petitioned the Tsar for help with. The Tsar gave a small sum for the funeral, and Rossi was buried in the Volkov Lutheran cemetery. During the Soviet period, he was reburied at the Lazarevskoe Cemetery of the Alexander Nevsky Monastery under the same tombstone.

== Works ==
- The Mikhailovsky Palace and adjacent buildings
- The Alexandrinsky Theater and adjacent buildings
- The Rossi Street buildings, including 2 Rossi Street
- The General Staff building
- The Senate and Synod Buildings
- A pavilion at Sobieski's Castle in Oława
- "Coffee House" pavilion in the Summer Garden
- Rossi Pavilion and Rossi Bridge in the Mikhailovsky Garden
- Pavilions in the garden of Anichkov Palace
- St. Catherine Church of the Ascension Convent and Nikolskaya Tower in Kremlin
- Military Gallery of the Winter Palace
- Yelagin Palace
- The façade of the Russian National Library, which faces Alexandrinskaya Square.
- St. Peter and St. Paul's Cathedral, Tallinn

== Honours and awards ==
- Order of St. Vladimir, 3rd class
- Order of St. Anna, 2nd class with diamonds

== Sources ==
- "Росси, Карл Иванович" . Brockhaus and Efron Encyclopedic Dictionary (in Russian). 1906.
