= Dudin =

- Pronunciation: IPA: ['dudʲin]

Origin
- Language: Russian
- Meaning: player of a pipe
- Region of origin: Russian Federation

Other names
- See also: Duda, Dudka

Dudin (Дудин ['dudʲin], with its female form Dudina (Дудина)) is a Russian surname derived from the Russian word дудка for "fife", "pipe" that is also present in the Russian diaspora.
Notable people with the name Dudin/Dudina include:

- Aleksei Dudin (born 1977), former Russian footballer
- Ann Dudin Brown (1822–1917), English philanthropist
- Mariia Dudina (born 1998), Russian handballer
- Marwan Dudin (1936–2016), Jordanian government minister
- Mikhail Dudin (1916–1993), Russian poet
- Nikolai Dudin (born 1973), Soviet-Russian serial killer
- Samuil Dudin (1863–1929), Russian ethnographer, photographer, artist and explorer
- Valery Dudin (born 1963), Soviet-Russian luger
- Yelena Dudina, Soviet-Russian canoer
