= Duda (name) =

Duda is a given name and surname.

In Slavic languages, the surname originates from a colloquial term for someone who plays the bagpipes, rooted in the word "duda", which means bagpipe. In Czech, it may also derive from "dudek", the word for a hoopoe bird, while in Hungarian, it comes either from the non-religious given name Duda or is an abbreviated version of Dudás. In Polish, the surname has archaic feminine forms: Dudzina (after husband) and Dudzianka (after father). These forms are still used colloquially.

== Given name ==
Notable people with the given name include:

- Duda Salabert (born 1981/82), Brazilian politician and teacher
- Duda Sanadze (born 1992), a Georgian basketball player
- Duda Yankovich (born 1976), a Serbian Brazilian fighter in boxing and mixed martial arts

== Mononym ==
- Duda (disambiguation) § People

== Nickname ==
- Duda Beat (Eduarda Bittencourt Simões, born 1987), Brazilian singer and songwriter
- Duda Hidalgo (born 1999), Brazilian politician
- Duda Francelino (Maria Eduarda Francelino da Silva, born 1995), Brazilian women's footballer
- Duda Lisboa (Eduarda Santos Lisboa, born 1998), Brazilian beach volleyball player
- Duda Santos (Adailma Aparecida da Silva dos Santos, born 1996), Brazilian footballer
- Duda Santos (actress) (Maria Eduarda Santos Domingues, born 2001), Brazilian actress and model

== Surname ==
=== Arts and entertainment ===
- Elisabeth Duda (born 1979), Polish writer, film and television actress
- Harry Duda (born 1944), Polish poet and publicist
- Ihor Duda (1940–2025), Ukrainian art historian, and cultural activist
- Jerzy Duda-Gracz (1941–2004), Polish painter
- John Joseph Duda (born 1977), American film actor
- Jörg Duda (born 1968), German composer
- Kelly Duda (born 1966), American filmmaker and activist
- Mariusz Duda (born 1975), Polish musician and composer
- Steve Duda, American DJ, record producer, engineer and manager

=== Politics ===
- Agata Kornhauser-Duda (born 1972), Polish former teacher and first lady of Poland
- Andrzej Duda (born 1972), president of Poland
- Joanna Duda-Gwiazda (born 1939), wife of the Polish trade unionist and politician Andrzej Gwiazda
- Piotr Duda (born 1962), Polish trade unionist
- Walter Duda (1921–2008), American politician from Nebraska

=== Sports ===
- Adam Duda (born 1991), Polish footballer
- Benedikt Duda (born 1994), German table tennis player
- Bogusław Duda (born 1953), Polish racewalker
- Brigitte Duda (born 1961), Austrian diver
- Jan-Krzysztof Duda (born 1998), Polish chess player
- Jason Duda (born 1975), Canadian ice hockey player
- Kacper Duda (born 2004), Polish footballer
- Lucas Duda (born 1986), American baseball player
- Mark Duda (born 1961), American football defensive tackle
- Ondrej Duda (born 1994), Slovak footballer
- Paul Duda (born 1943), Canadian football player
- Radek Duda (born 1979), Czech ice hockey player

=== Other people ===
- Bonaventura Duda (1924–2017), Croatian Franciscan friar, theologian and member of the Croatian Academy of Sciences and Arts
- Jarosław Duda, Polish computer scientist
- Oswald Duda (1869–1941), German entomologist
- Radu Duda (born 1960), Romanian prince
- Richard O. Duda, American professor of electrical engineering

== See also ==
- Duda (disambiguation)
- Dudka
