= Dūda (surname) =

Dūda is a Baltic surname. Notable people with the name include:

- Andrejs Dūda (born 1981), Latvian swimmer
- Rimantas Dūda (1953–2017), Lithuanian painter

== See also ==
- Duda (disambiguation)
- Duda (name)
