= Tsuda Sanzō =

Japanese policeman and attempted assassin (1855–1891)

- 津田 三蔵
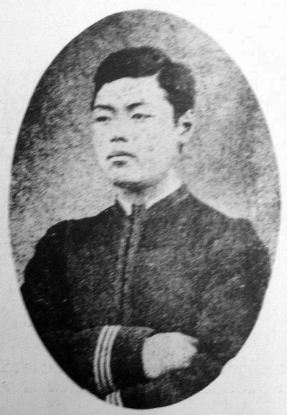
- Born: Sanzō Tsuda; February 15, 1855; Kanayama, Japan
- Died: September 30, 1891 (aged 36)
- Occupation: Policeman
- Known for: Ōtsu incident

Tsuda Sanzō (津田 三蔵, Tsuda Sanzō; February 15, 1855 – September 30, 1891) was a Japanese policeman who in 1891 attempted to assassinate the Tsesarevich Nicholas Alexandrovich of Russia (later Emperor Nicholas II), in what became known as the Ōtsu incident. He was convicted for attempted murder and sentenced to life imprisonment. He died in prison shortly after his incarceration, either from pneumonia or self-induced starvation.

== Biography ==
Born into a samurai family in the village of Kanayama, his ancestors were doctors to the daimyōs of Iga. The Tsuda clan got stipend of 130 koku. The Tsuda family lived in Yanagiwara, Shitaya, Edo (present-day Taitō Ward, Tokyo). His father was Tsuda Choan and his mother was Kino. Sanzo was the second son; his older brother Yotsugu ran away from home and was never seen again, while his younger brother Chiyoyoshi became a military police officer and then a worker at the Miyoshi Electric Factory.

When Sanzo was 7 or 8 years old (during the Bunkyū era), his father Choan got into a sword fight and was reduced in rank and moved to Iga Ueno, and placed under lifelong house arrest. In 1870, Sanzo moved to Tokyo and enlisted in the Tokyo Garrison. In March 1872, he was transferred to the Nagoya Garrison. In March of the following year, 1873, he was deployed under Major Nogi Maresuke to suppress the Echizen Goho Tai-Ikki. In July, he was transferred to the Kanazawa Sub-Army.

In 1872 he was drafted into the army. He participated as a sergeant in the suppression of the uprising of the samurai in 1877 under the leadership of Saigō Takamori. On the 9th of January 1882 he left the army, he served in the police force from March 15th 1882 onward. He served in Mie Prefecture Matsusaka police station until 1885, when he was fired for conflict with another policeman in a party. Since December 1885, he was entered as policeman in Shiga Prefecture and he was twice rewarded the Medal for Merit until the Ōtsu incident.

=== Ōtsu incident ===
In 1891, then-Tsarevich Nicholas visited Japan during his eastern journeys. As the Russian entourage traveled through Ōtsu on May 11 (April 29 in the Russian Old Style), Tsuda, who was assigned to guard the street that the distinguished guests would follow, swung his saber at Nicholas, aiming at his head. Nicholas turned and the blow grazed him, leaving a 9-centimeter scar on his head. Prince George of Greece and Denmark, who was with him in the entourage, blocked Tsuda's second blow with a cane, saving his life. Tsuda tried to escape, but was apprehended by the rikshaw drivers who were with the Tsarevitch.

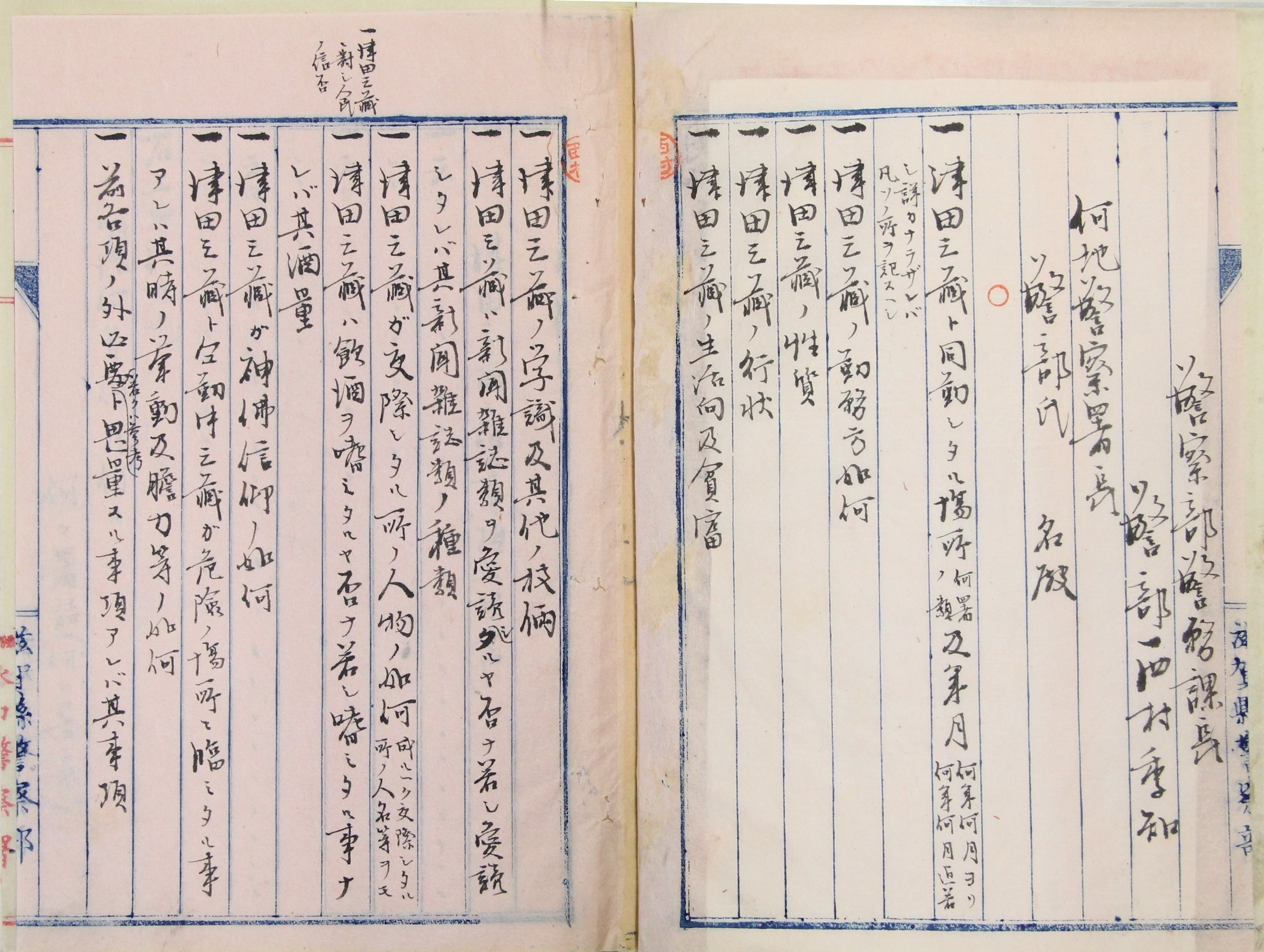
Notice of investigation into the background of Tsuda Sanzō, Japanese police record of the Ōtsu incident, 13 May 1891

At the trial, Tsuda indicated that he had attempted to assassinate Nicholas because he suspected that he was a Russian spy. Tsuda was sentenced to life imprisonment on 25 May 1891, which he had to serve in Hokkaido. However, on September 30 of that year, Tsuda died in prison from pneumonia. According to another version, he starved himself to death.

In his native village after the incident, it was forbidden to give newborn children the name Sanzo, and his family became outcasts. There were also calls to rename the city of Ōtsu because of its association with the disgraceful act.
