= Tsarevich Chapel in Mariupol =

Orthodox chapel in Mariupol, Ukraine

Chapel dedicated to the tsarevich Nicolas Alexandrovich in Mariupol
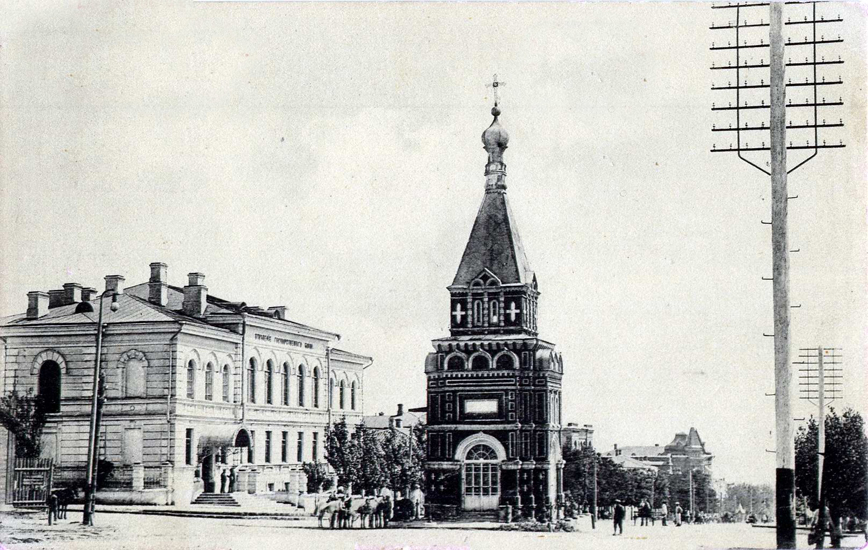
- Chapel dedicated to the tsarevich Nicolas Alexandrovich in Mariupol
- 47°05′46″N 37°32′55″E
- Country: Ukraine

History
- Status: Demolished

Architecture
- Years built: 1895
- Demolished: 1933

The Tsarevich's Chapel was a chapel on Peace Avenue (Myru Ave) in Mariupol.

== History ==
The chapel was erected by Tsar Alexander III to commemorate the rescue of his son Tsarevich Nicholas Alexandrovich of Russia (future Tsar Nicholas II) on 28 April 1891 by Prince George of Greece, Nicholas' cousin, who rescued the life of the Tsarevich (Ōtsu incident). It was consecrated on May 5, 1895.

The building stood until it was demolished in 1934 by the Bolshevik government as part of the Atheist Five-Year Plan.

== Gallery ==
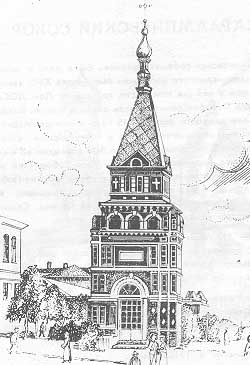

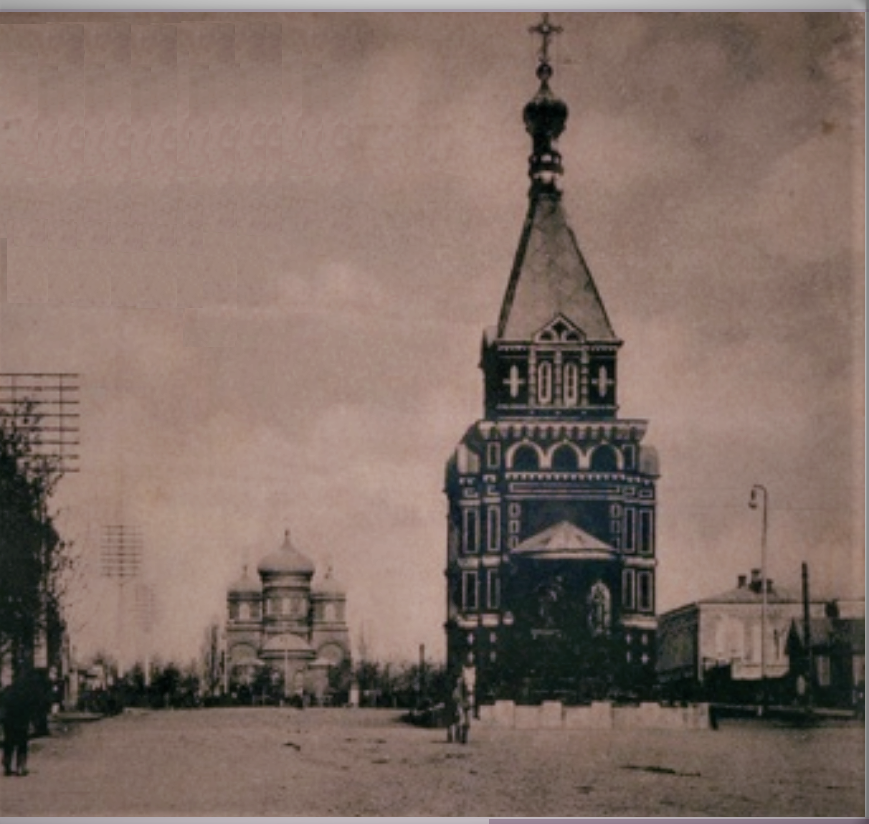

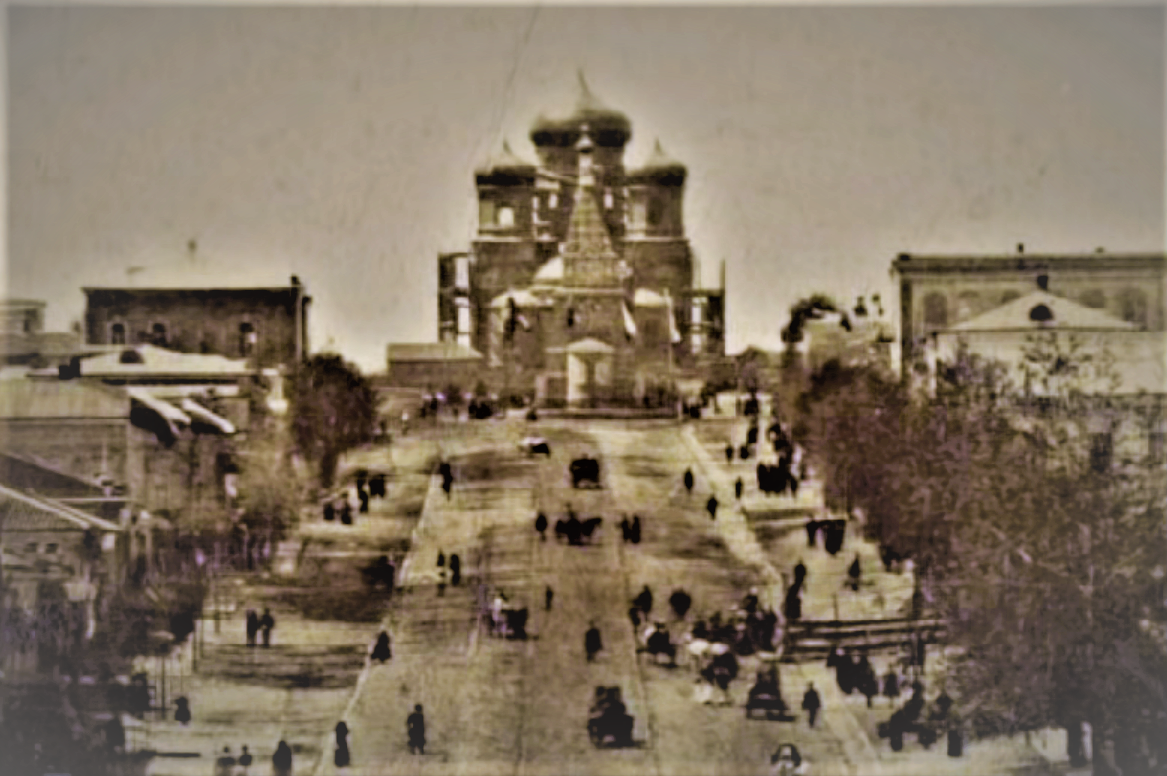

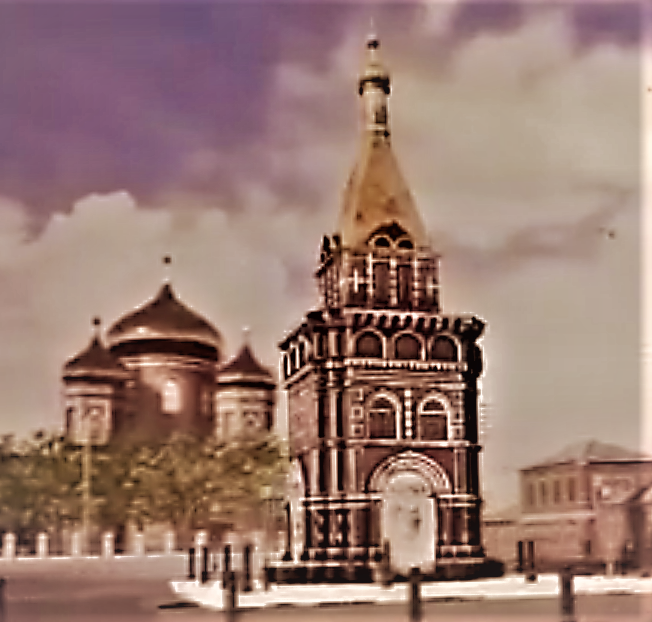

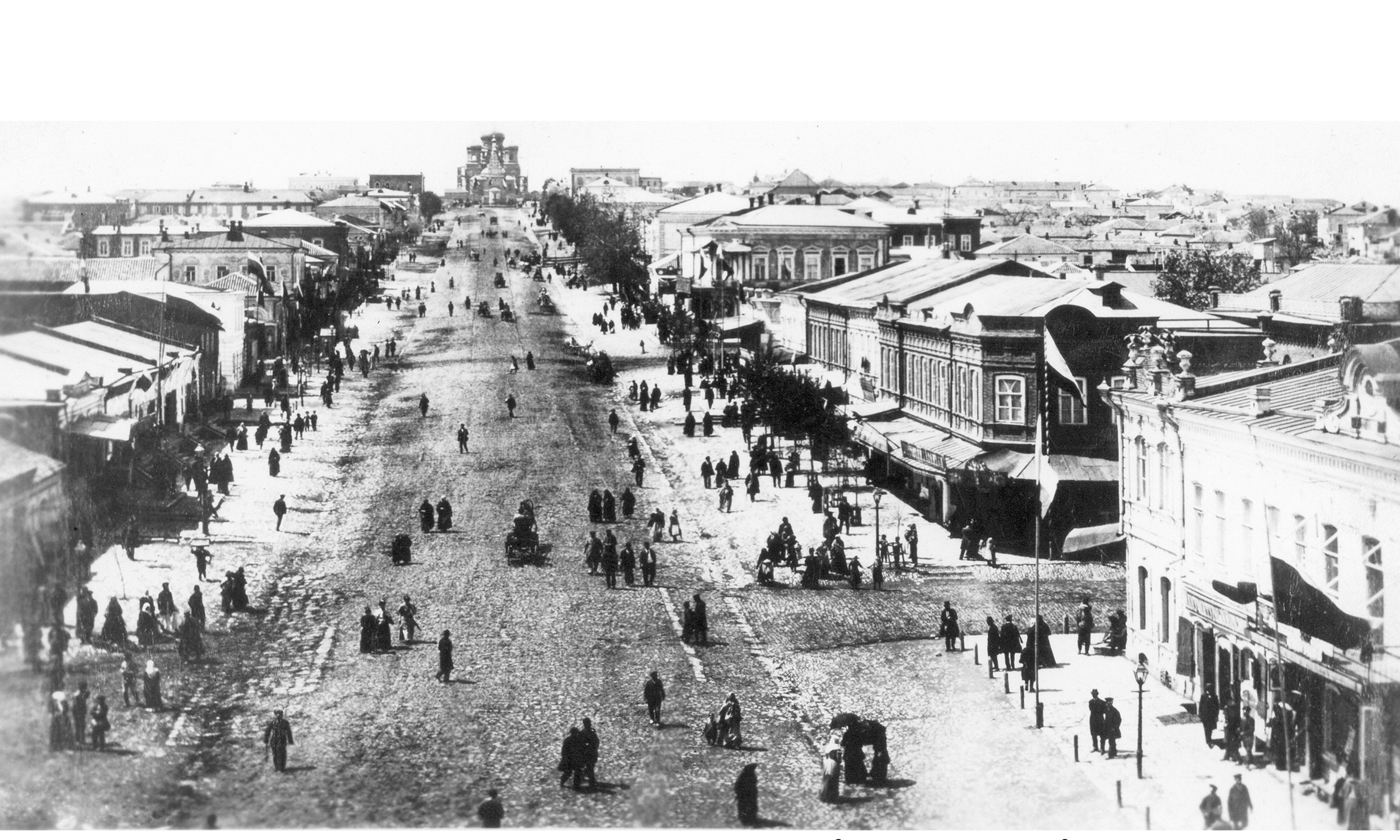
