= Košetice =

- Municipality
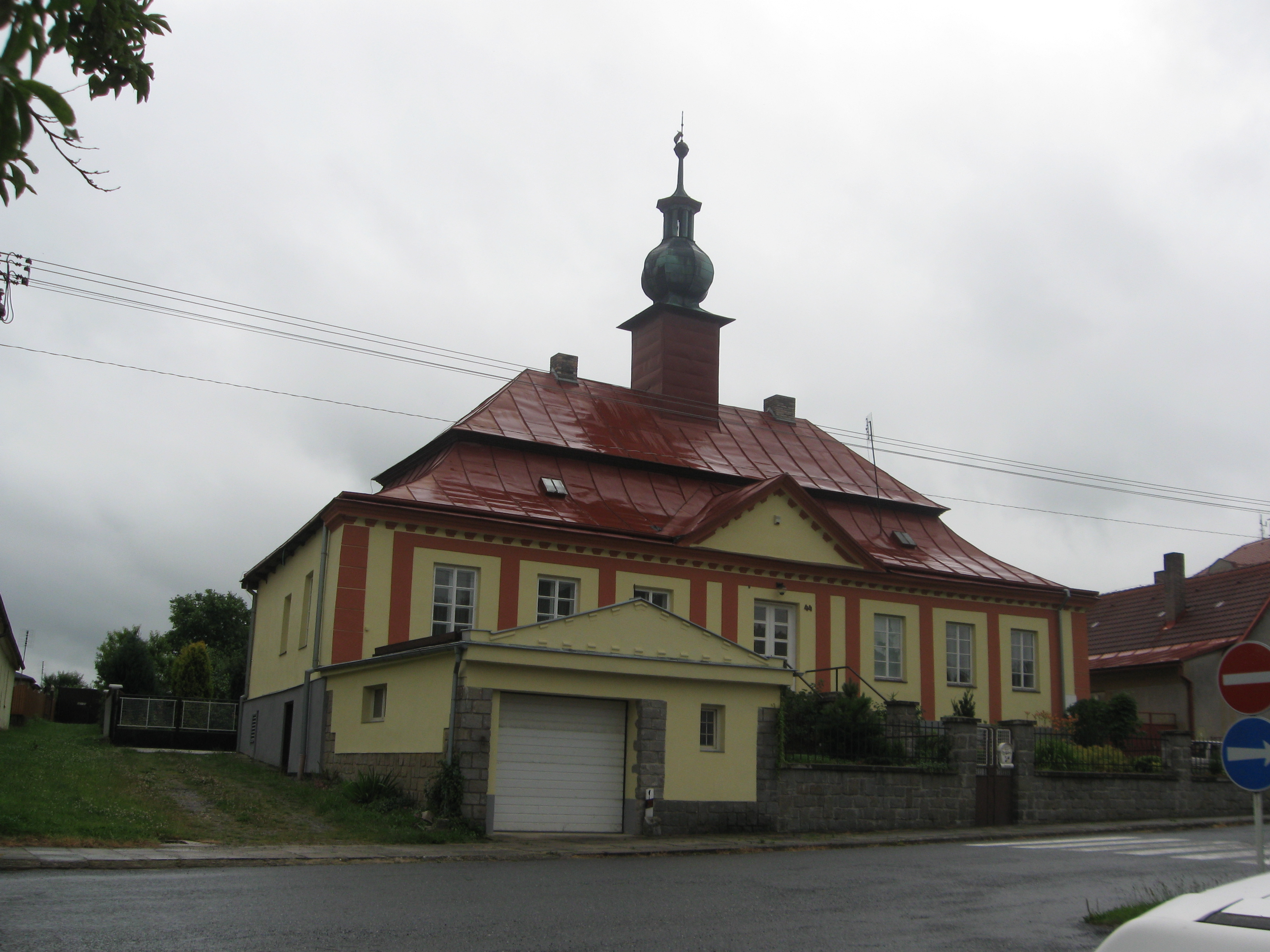
- New Castle

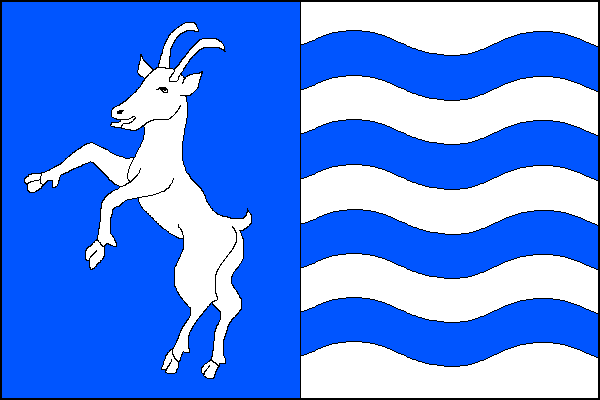
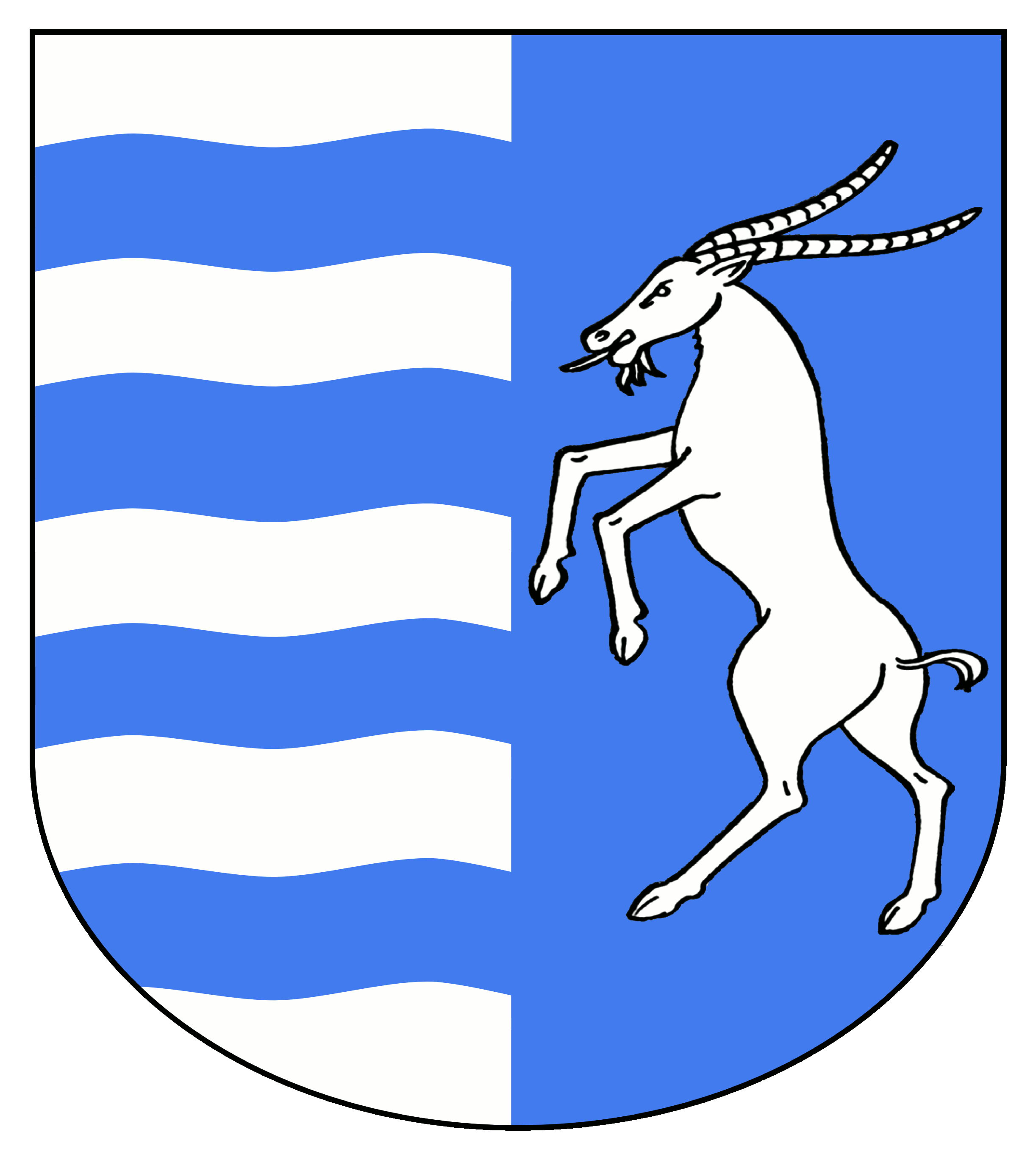
- Flag Coat of arms

- Location in the Czech Republic
- Coordinates: 49°33′30″N 15°6′59″E
- Country: Czech Republic
- Region: Vysočina
- District: Pelhřimov
- First mentioned: 1352

Area
  - Total: 12.92 km^{2} (4.99 sq mi)
- Elevation: 520 m (1,710 ft)

Population (2026-01-01)
  - Total: 760
  - Density: 59/km^{2} (150/sq mi)
- Time zone: UTC+1 (CET)
  - Summer (DST): UTC+2 (CEST)
- Postal codes: 394 22, 395 01
- Website: www.kosetice.cz

Košetice (German: Koschetitz) is a municipality and village in Pelhřimov District in the Vysočina Region of the Czech Republic. It has about 800 inhabitants.

Košetice lies approximately 17 kilometres (11 mi) north-west of Pelhřimov, 40 km (25 mi) north-west of Jihlava, and 77 km (48 mi) south-east of Prague.

== Administrative division ==
Košetice consists of two municipal parts (in brackets population according to the 2021 census):

- Košetice (681)
- Nová Ves (12)

== Demographics ==
Historical population
Year	Pop.	±%
1869	1,257	—
1880	1,189	−5.4%
1890	1,209	+1.7%
1900	1,151	−4.8%
1910	1,047	−9.0%
1921	982	−6.2%
1930	943	−4.0%
1950	768	−18.6%
1961	751	−2.2%
1970	671	−10.7%
1980	722	+7.6%
1991	757	+4.8%
2001	715	−5.5%
2011	702	−1.8%
2021	693	−1.3%
Source: Censuses

== Notable people ==
- Harry Duda (born 1944), Polish poet
