= Dudka =

- Pronunciation: IPA: [ˈdutka]

Origin
- Languages: Russian, Polish, Ukrainian
- Meaning: player of a pipe
- Region of origin: Eastern Europe

Other names
- See also: Duda, Dudin

Dudka (Дудка [ˈdutka])) is a Ukrainian, Russian and Polish surname derived from the Eastern Slavic word дудка for "fife", "pipe" that is also present in the Ukrainian, Polish and Russian diaspora.
Notable people with the name Dudka include:

- Dariusz Dudka (born 1983), Polish football player
- Mykyta Dudka (born 2000), Ukrainian football player
- Stanley Dudka (1923–2008), Canadian fishery officer
- Vyacheslav Dudka (born 1960), Russian politician.

== See also ==
- Duda
