= Russian Museum of Ethnography =

Museum in Saint Petersburg, Russia

Coordinates: 59°56′17″N 30°20′04″E

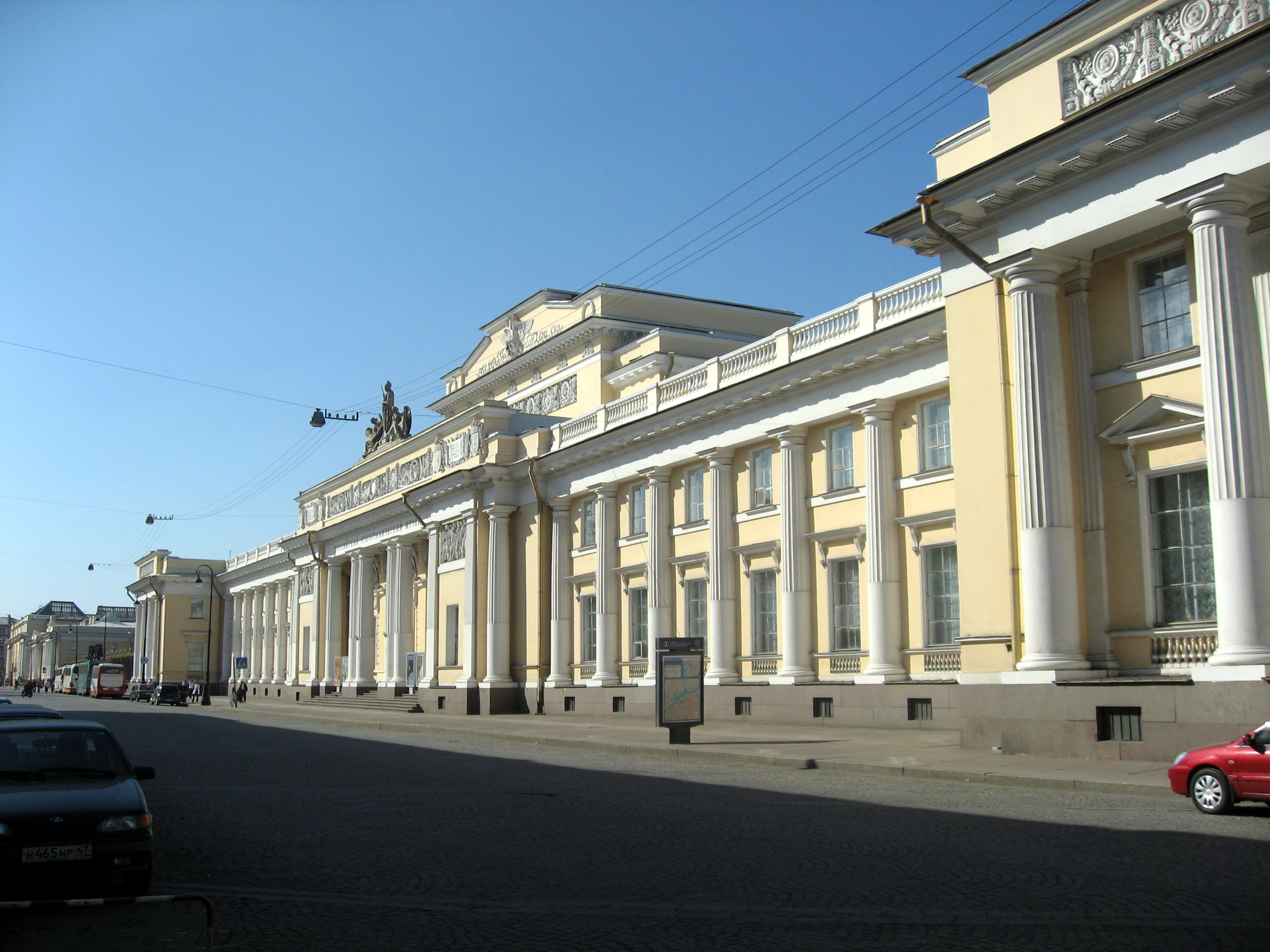
The Doric colonnade

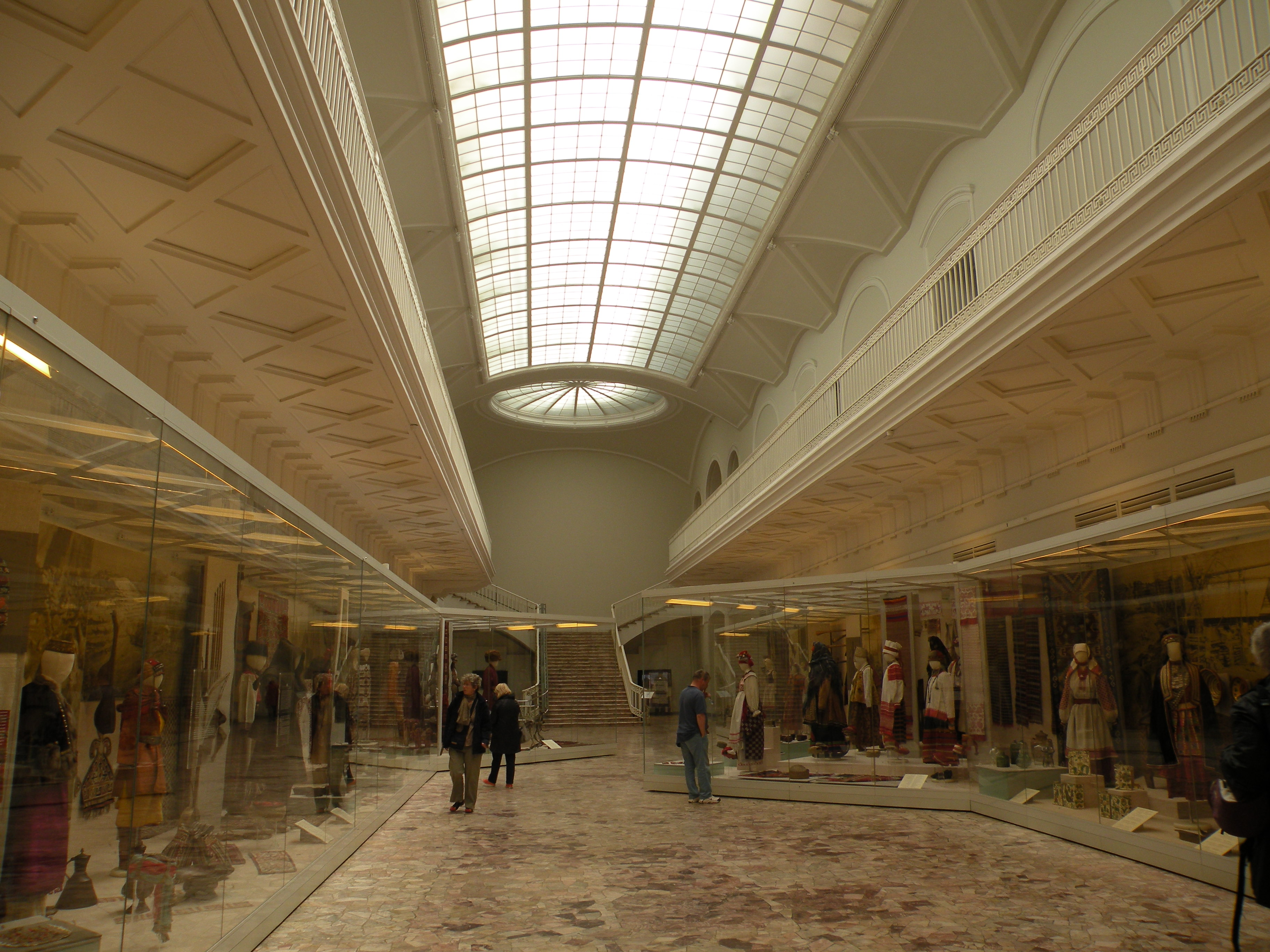
The interior

The Russian Museum of Ethnography (Russian: Российский этнографический музей, romanized: Rossiyskiy etnograficheskiy muzey) is a museum in St. Petersburg that houses a collection of about 500,000 items relating to the ethnography, or cultural anthropology, of peoples of the former Russian Empire and the Soviet Union.

The founding date of the Russian Ethnographic Museum is considered to be 1895, when a separate ethnographic department was formed at the Russian Museum on the initiative and under the leadership of Samuil Dudin. On April 13, Emperor Nicholas II, in fulfillment of the will and in memory of his father Emperor Alexander III, signed the Supreme Decree No. 11532 “On the establishment of a special institution called the “Russian Museum of Emperor Alexander III” and on the presentation for this purpose of the Mikhailovsky Palace acquired by the treasury with all the outbuildings, services and garden belonging to it.

The museum's first exhibits were the gifts received by the Russian Tsars from peoples of Imperial Russia. These were supplemented by regular expeditions to various parts of the Russian Empire which began in 1901. Further exhibits were purchased by Nicholas II of Russia and other members of his family (as state financing was not enough to purchase new exhibits). A collection of Buddhist religious objects was acquired for the museum by Prince Esper Ukhtomsky. Prince Tenishev, a wealthy industrialist, donated to the museum the archives of his private ethnographic bureau that had been documenting the life of Russian peasants since the 19th century.

The collection was not officially opened to the general public until 1923 and was not detached from the Russian Museum until 1934. When the Museum of the Peoples of the USSR in Moscow (successor to the Dashkov Museum) was shut down in 1948, its collections were transferred to the Ethnographic Museum in Leningrad. This museum should not be confused with the much older Museum of Anthropology and Ethnography, popularly known as the Kunstkamera.

== Museum departments ==
- Department of Ethnography of the Russian People
- Department of Ethnography of Belarus, Ukraine, Moldova
- Department of Ethnography of the Peoples of the North-West and Baltic States
- Department of Ethnography of the Peoples of the Caucasus, Central Asia and Kazakhstan
- Department of Ethnography of the Peoples of the Volga and Urals Region
- Department of Ethnography of Siberia and the Far East
- Children's Ethnographic Center

== Department of Ethnography of the Peoples of the Caucasus, Central Asia and Kazakhstan ==
In 1901–1902 Dudin made a large-scale expedition that covered the territory from the Caspian Sea to Kashgar, creating a fund for the culture of the peoples of Central Asia. The direction was supervised by academicians S.F. Oldenburg, V.V. Bartold, V.V. Radlov. On the initiative of Radlov, the first expeditionary trips were entrusted to Dudin, who, together with Bartold, participated in archaeological expeditions to the region. Under the leadership of Radlov, Dudin drew up a travel program that received the approval of the manager of the Russian Museum, Grand Duke Georgy Mikhailovich. During the expedition, Dudin collected more than two thousand items of everyday culture of the peoples of Uzbekistan. In addition, Dudin took many photographs. Also, the Central Asian collection in 1910-1916 was replenished with Kazakh collections (A.N. Beketov, F.F. Karavaev, V.N. Vasiliev), correspondent V.D. Peltz collected a collection from mountain Tajiks, engineer P.A. Komarov donated unique collections of folk theater dolls from Tashkent. Items were also purchased from private individuals. In the 20s of the 20th century, the department's collection was significantly expanded, including works of art from private and palace collections in St. Petersburg and its suburbs, including personal gifts from the Bukhara emirs to Alexander III, Nicholas II and members of their families.

In the 1930s, the museum received a collection of items from the traditional life of the Karakalpaks of the 19th – early 20th centuries, collected in 1927–1928. artist A.S. Melkov. In 1924–1925 F. Fielstrup formed two collections of items from the nomadic life of the Kyrgyz. D.G. Yomudskaya-Burunova was involved in the formation of the Turkmen collection. In 1934 E.N. Studenetskaya expanded the collection with household items of the Ingush. At the same time, in Khorezm V.V. Ekimova has put together an Uzbek collection on the theme of silk processing. In 1937 A.S. Morozova and M.V. Sazonov studied the Turkmen Igdyr tribe. In 2007, an exhibition on the culture of the Jewish people was created, where collections on Bukharian Jews were acquired.

In 2016, the World Society for the Study, Preservation and Popularization of the Cultural Heritage of Uzbekistan, with the participation of the Chairman of the Board of Trustees Bakhtiyor Fazylov, the Chairman of the Scientific Council Ds.C Edward Rtveladze, as well as the Chairman of the Board of the World Society and the head of the project “Cultural Heritage of Uzbekistan” PhD Firdavs Abdukhalikov published the book-album “Cultural heritage of Uzbekistan. Collection of the Russian Ethnographic Museum", which became the second volume of the project series "Cultural Heritage of Uzbekistan in Collections of the World". A documentary film was also made dedicated to the cultural heritage of Uzbekistan in the collections of the Russian Ethnographic Museum. Deputy director of the museum Alexander Mirin and deputy director for storage Natalya Prokopyeva took part in the preparation of the book and film.

== Books ==
- Студенецкая Е. Н. Осетины в Музее этнографии народов СССР (Собирательская и экспозиционная работа 1906—1983 гг.) // Археология и традиционная этнография Северной Осетии. — Орджоникидзе, 1985. — С. 151—174.
- Дудин С.М. 1900–1902. Отчет С.М. Дудина о поездках в Среднюю Азию в 1900–1902 гг.
- F. Abdukhalikov, E. Kubel, T. Emelyanenko The cultural legacy of Uzbekistan. The collection of the Russian museum of ethnography Zamon-Press-Info Nashriyot uyi» 2016
