= Dudda =

Dudda may refer to:

- Dudda, Hassan, Karnataka, India
- Julian Dudda (born 1993), German football player

== See also ==
- Duda (disambiguation)
