= Doodah =

Doo Dah, doo dahs, doodah or doodahs can refer to:

- the repeated line-ending of the lyrics of the 1850 song "Camptown Races"
  - "DooDah!", 1998 song by Cartoons, inspired by "Camptown Races"
- Doo Dah Parade, held in Pasadena, California, US
- a placeholder name for an object, also doodad and doohickey

== See also ==
- Bonzo Dog Doo-Dah Band
- "Zip-a-Dee-Doo-Dah"
- Duda (disambiguation)
