= Esper Ukhtomsky =

Russian poet, publisher and Oriental enthusiast (1861–1921)

Esper Esperovich Ukhtomsky
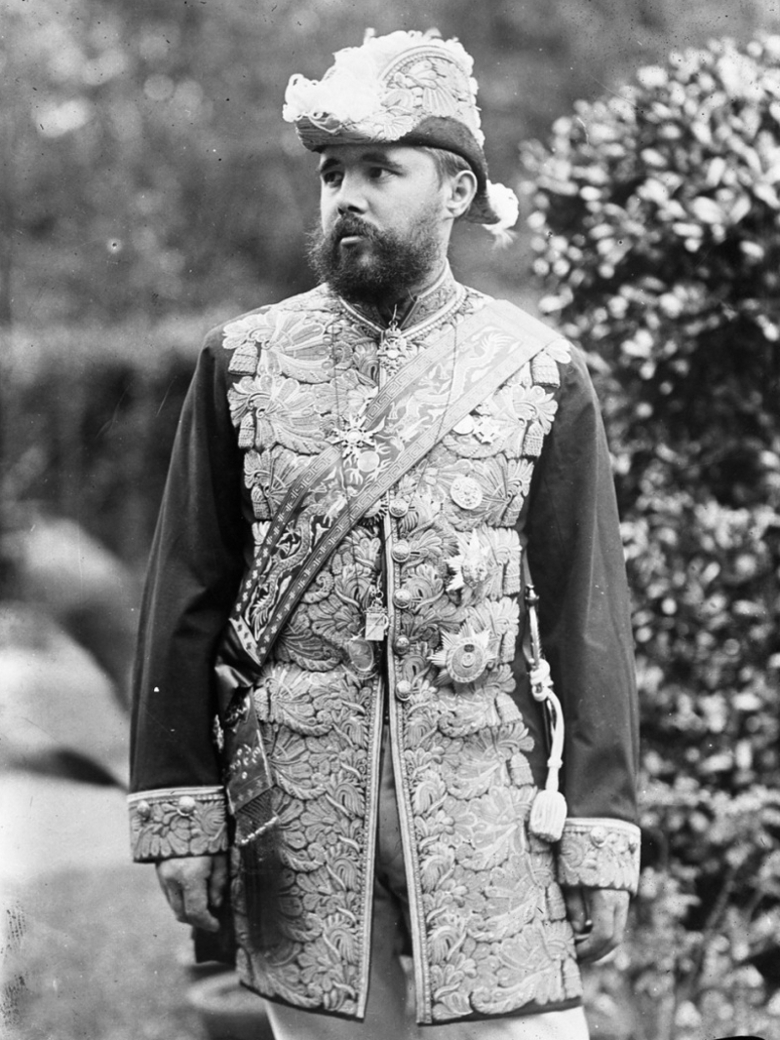
- Born: 26 August 1861; Oranienbaum, Russian Empire
- Died: 26 November 1921 (aged 60); Detskoye Selo, Soviet Russia
- Occupations: Diplomat; Courtier; Poet
- Spouse: Maria Vasilievna Vasilyeva
- Children: Dy Esperovich Ukhtomsky
- Parent(s): Esper Alekseevich Ukhtomsky; Yevgeniya Alekseevna Greig

Prince Esper Esperovich Ukhtomsky, Эспер Эсперович Ухтомский (26 August [O.S. 14 August] 1861 – 26 November 1921) was a poet, publisher and Oriental enthusiast in late Tsarist Russia. He was a close confidant of Tsar Nicholas II and accompanied him whilst he was Tsesarevich on his Grand tour to the East. He was the first significant outside collector of Tibetan art, whose collection is now in museums in St. Petersburg.

== Family ==
Ukhtomsky was born in 1861 near the Imperial summer retreat at Oranienbaum. His family traced their lineage to the Rurik dynasty, and had been moderately prominent boyars (nobility) in the Muscovite period. The Ukhtomsky family claimed to be direct descendents of Rurik the Viking, the semi-legendary founder of Russia.

His father, Esper Alekseevich Ukhtomsky had been an officer in the Imperial Russian Navy during the Crimean War, and had served during the siege of Sevastopol. He went on to establish a commercial steamship company with routes from Saint Petersburg to India and China. After the death of his first wife in 1870 when Uktomksy was only 9 years old, he married 1874 Karin Etholène, the daughter of Adolf Arvid Etholén, who was the Russian governor of Alaska. He died 1885 in Montreux, Switzerland. His mother, Yevgeniya (Dzhenni) Alekseevna Greig, was descended from the Greigs, a long line of admirals of Scottish origin, notably Samuel and Alexey Greig. One of Esper's relations, Pavel Petrovich Ukhtomsky, served as a vice-admiral of the Pacific Squadron in the Russo-Japanese War.

== Early life ==
Esper was privately educated by tutors during his early years, and travelled to Europe on numerous occasions with his parents. As a teenager, he was notably Slavophile in his politics and he published his first poem in the Slavophile journal Rus edited by Ivan Aksakov. Over the years, his poetry was published in such journals as Vestnik Evropy, Russkaia mysl’, Niva, Sever and Grazhdanin. He received his secondary education at a Gymnasium and went on to read philosophy and literature at the University of Saint Petersburg. He graduated in 1884, winning a silver medal for his master's thesis 'A Historical and Critical Survey of the Study of Free Will.' It was during this period that he began to dabble in poetry, which was published in a number of Russian periodicals. A romantic, mystical figure with a deep interest in the occult and a strong sense of aristocratic aestheticism, Ukhtomsky became interested in the subject of Asia as an young man, becoming convinced that Russia's destiny lay in the East. Ukhtomsky combined his interests in the occult, aestheticism and Asia with a very firm ultra-conservatism that was implacably opposed to any changes that might threaten the absolute monarchy presided over by the House of Romanov.

He got a job in the Interior Ministry's Department of Foreign Creeds, and travelled to Eastern Siberia to report on the Buryats. He then went on to travel as far as Mongolia and China, reporting on frictions between Russian Orthodoxy and Buddhism. Ukhtomsky became fascinated with Buddhism, declaring in a report his admiration for "the humane creed of Gautama Buddha, second only to Christianity". During his time in Buriatia, Ukhtomsky visited 20 Buddhist monasteries which all recognized the authority of the Bogd Khan in Urga (modern Ulan Bator, Mongolia) and ultimately the authority of the Dalai Lama in Lhasa, Tibet. To resolve the dispute, Uktomsky went on to visit the Bogd Khan in Urga and from there he went on to Beijing to meet senior Buddhist clerics.

== Asianist ==
He also took note of the effects of Alexander III's policies of Russification. Historically, Russianiness as defined by the Russian state was not in terms of language or ethnicity, but rather in terms of loyalty to the House of Romanov with those loyal to the Romanov family being Russian. Thus, the Russian state had been very tolerant of Buddhism with the Empress Elizabeth extending state support for the Buddhist clergy of the Kalmyks and the Buryats in 1741 in exchange for their loyalty. During the reign of the Emperor Alexander III Russianness started to be redefined in terms of the Russian language and culture together with the Orthodox faith, which stained the loyalty of previously loyal peoples such as the Kalmyks and the Buryats. Ukhtomsky would later write reports criticising the overzealousness of the local Orthodox clergy in attempting to win converts, and expressed tolerant views regarding Russia's non-Orthodox faiths. Ukhtomsky had mystical notions about Buddhism, which he combined with his belief in the myth of the "White Tsar", which led him to the original definition of Russianness that saw those as loyal to the Russian state as Russian, regardless of what their language or religion was. In one of his reports, Ukhtomsky argued that Buddhist peoples such as the Buryats and the Kalmyks "instinctively" had "an inner link with the people of far-away North". Ukhtomsky criticised the policy of Russification and argued for the loyalty of the Buddhist clergy towards the Russian empire, blaming all of the difficulties in Buddhist-Orthodox relations on the Orthodox Archbishop of Irkutsk, Veniamin. Ukhtomsky had a very strong state-centric version of Russian nationalism that saw the loyalty to the monarchy as the epitome of Russianness, and his vision of a tolerant Russian empire was intended to strengthen the empire, not weaken it as his reactionary critics contended.

Ukhtomsky's Asianist ideology was grounded in a type of romantic conservatism common among the Russian upper classes at the time. As one historian noted: "In an age when Tsarist prerogatives were perennially under siege by calls for European style reforms such as parliaments and constitutions the Asianist ideology provided an attractive argument for maintaining the autocratic status quo". Uktomsky sincerely believed that in Asia the Russian Emperor would finally find subjects worthy of him unlike much of the Russian intelligentsia, peasantry and working class who were forever challenging the status quo. Ukhtomsky believed in the notion originating in Russian folklore of the "White Tsar" as the natural ruler of Asia who would unite the East against the West.

== Rising fame and the Grand Tour ==
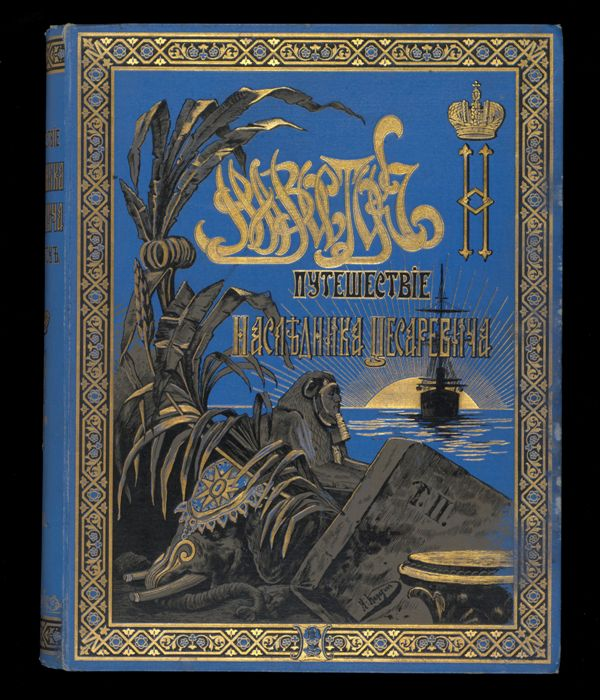
Ukhtomsky's book, detailing his journey to the east with Nicholas

Ukhtomsky's activities attracted the attention of the Oriental establishment active in Saint Petersburg, and he was elected to the Imperial Geographical Society and began to advise the Foreign Ministry on East Asian matters. The Emperor Alexander III selected him to be one of his tutors to the Tsararevich Nicholas. Ukhtomsky came to be the leader of a faction known as the vostochniki ("Easterners") who promoted the ideology of Eurasianism, arguing that Russia had a special bond with Asia. In common with other vostochniki, Ukhtomsky argued that the military conquest of Asia was unnecessary as he believed that common cultural values already linked Asia to Russia. Ukhtomsky wrote: "Asia, strictly speaking in the full sense, was Russia itself".

His expertise in Eastern matters and his high social standing led to him being selected to accompany the Tsesarevich Nicholas on his Grand tour to the East. Nicholas took a liking to Esper Ukhtomsky, writing to his sister that "the little Ukhtomskii...is such a jolly fellow". Instead of visiting Europe on his "Grand Tour", Nicholas advised by Ukhtomsky decided to take his "Grand Tour" mostly in Asia. The "Grand Tour" of 1890-1891 began in Vienna, going on to Trieste, the principle port of the Austrian Empire. From Trieste the Imperial party sailed to Greece and from there they travelled to Egypt. From Egypt, they travelled via the Red Sea and the Indian Ocean to India, Ceylon (modern Sri Lanka), Singapore, French Indochina (modern Vietnam, Cambodia and Laos), China, and Japan. From Japan, they sailed to the port city of Vladivostok, the "star of the East", where in March 1891 Nicholas formally opened the construction of the Trans-Siberian Railroad to link Moscow to Vladivostok. From Vladivostok they travelled across Siberia to finally return to St. Petersburg. After returning to Russia in 1891, Ukhtomsky was appointed to the role of court chamberlain, and served on the Siberian Railway Committee. He also began work on his account of the grand tour, entitled Travels in the East of Nicholas II.

The book was written in close consultation with Nicholas II, who personally approved each chapter. It took six years to complete, and was published in three volumes between 1893 and 1897 by Brockhaus, in Leipzig. Despite being expensive at 35 roubles, it still ran to four editions. Empress Alexandra Fyodorovna bought several thousand copies for various government ministries and departments, and a cheaper edition was subsequently printed. The work was translated into English, French, German and Chinese, with a copy being presented to the Chinese Emperor and Empress in 1899 by the Russian envoy.

Ukhtomsky became a close confidant and adviser to the Tsar on matters of Eastern policy and was made editor of the Sankt-Peterburgskie vedomosti (Saint Petersburg Gazette) in 1895. He used the paper to promote and emphasise the importance of Russian expansionism in the East as a basis of Russian foreign policy, an approach which sometimes drew fire from right-wing colleagues, and those advocating Westernisation. Ukhtomsky turned the Sankt-Peterburgskie vedomosti, previously a liberal newspaper, into a conservative paper that glorified autocracy, which alienated many readers. Under his editorship, the Sankt-Peterburgskie vedomosti took a markedly anti-Western line as he warned in one editorial that to "follow slavishly the scientific road of the West [which will only lead] to catastrophes of a revolutionary nature." At the same time, his advocacy of his pan-Asian ideas and his defense of the empire's minorities against the policy of Russification won him many critics on the right. Konstantin Pobedonostsev, the reactionary chief procurator of the Holy Synod, censured the Sankt-Peterburgskie vedomosti several times for its criticism of the Russification policy that he favored and for the editorials Ukhtomsky wrote in defense of the Jews and the Poles.

He continued to converse with Nicholas and used his position to advocate Russian intervention in East Asia, but by 1900 Ukhtomsky's influence was waning. In 1893, Ukhtomsky introduced the court in St. Petersburg to Petr Alexanderovich Badmayev, who despite his Russian name was a Buryat. Badmaev was considered in St. Petersburg to be one of the leading Asian experts, but the Finance Minister Count Sergei Witte who initially consulted him came to distrust him, regarding Badmaev as a schemer who was forever seeking the support of the Russian state for his business interests in Asia. By 1895, Badmaev had opened the trading post of Badmaev & Co in Chita with the support of the Russian state, but Ukhtomsky had by this point disallowed him, complaining that Badmaev was more interested in enriching himself than anything else. The War Minister, Marshal Aleksei Kuropatkin wrote in his diary: "I think that one of the most dangerous features of the sovereign is his love of mysterious countries and individuals such as the Buriat Badmaev and Prince Ukhtomsky. They inspire in him fantasies of the greatness of the Russian tsar as the master of Asia. The Emperor covets Tibet and similar places. All this is very disquieting and I shiver at the thought of the damage this would cause to Russia". Ukhtomsky believed that a policy of economic penetration was sufficient to bring the Chinese empire into the Russian sphere of influence and he besides for the Trans-Siberian Railroad, Ukhtomsky sponsored the Chinese Eastern Railroad that linked Manchuria to the Trans-Siberian Railroad and the Russo-Chinese bank.

In his writings, Ukhtomsky frequently criticised European imperialism in Asia, writing of his disgust with Western "mercantile" colonialism and the "insidious" promotion of Christianity by Western missionaries which he saw as damaging Asia's spiritual heritage. By contrast, he felt that Russia had a natural "inherent" unity with Asia based on common cultural and historical traditions. Ukhtomsky had ambiguous views about race, most notably putting the inverted commas around the phrases "white race" and "yellow race", which was his way of suggesting that the categories were constructs as opposed to reflecting reality. Ukhtomsky argued that Russia and India had a common racial heritage, arguing that the Russians and the Indians were both the products of a fusion between the Aryan and Turan races, but in his writings on China and Japan, he argued for common spiritual and historical heritage, but never a racial one. As it became apparent after 1895 that Russia and Japan were locked into rivalry over spheres of influence in Manchuria and Korea, his writings on Japan became more hostile as he wrote about a "yellow Asia" that stretched from Japan to Vietnam, and he called the Japanese a "foreign race". The Russian historian Alexander Bukh wrote about Ukhtomsky having "...an almost mystical conception of the Russian monarchy as being revered and respected by all the peoples of Asia". Bukh noted when Ukhtomsky argued for the "sameness" of Russia and China, it was always in juxtaposition to the West. On one hand, Uktomsky argued that it was a common sense of "Asianness" that brought Russia and China together in opposition to the West, but at the same time he argued that "Aryan Russia" was the senior partner to its junior partner "yellow China".

== China and the Trans-Siberian Railway ==
As chairman of the Russo-Chinese Bank, Ukhtomsky was involved in negotiations with the Chinese regarding the route of the Trans-Siberian Railway, and escorted Chinese statesman Li Hongzhang for negotiations in St Petersburg in 1896. The Russians were keen to secure a route through Manchuria. Ukhtomsky travelled to the Chinese court in 1897 and presented gifts to the emperor, as well as large bribes to officials; he later became the chairman of the Chinese Eastern Railway.

When the Boxer Rebellion broke out in 1900, it stoked fears of the "Yellow Peril" throughout the world, but Ukhtomsky used the occasion to repeat in a memo to the Emperor Nicholas II his long held beliefs about Asia, arguing that the Boxer Rebellion was fundamentally directed against the Western powers, and that Russia's relationship with China was different in his view. Ukhtomsky concluded: "There are in essence no borders for us in Asia, and there cannot be any, other than the immeasurable blue sea freely lapping at her shores, as unbridled as the spirit of the Russian people". Ukhtomsky was dispatched to Beijing to offer Russian support against the Western powers who might seek to take advantage of the situation and push into China. By the time he arrived in Shanghai, he was too late. The Western powers had lifted the Siege of Peking a month earlier and had occupied the city. Despite offering to represent the Chinese to the occupying armies he was recalled to Saint Petersburg.

== Decline and legacy ==
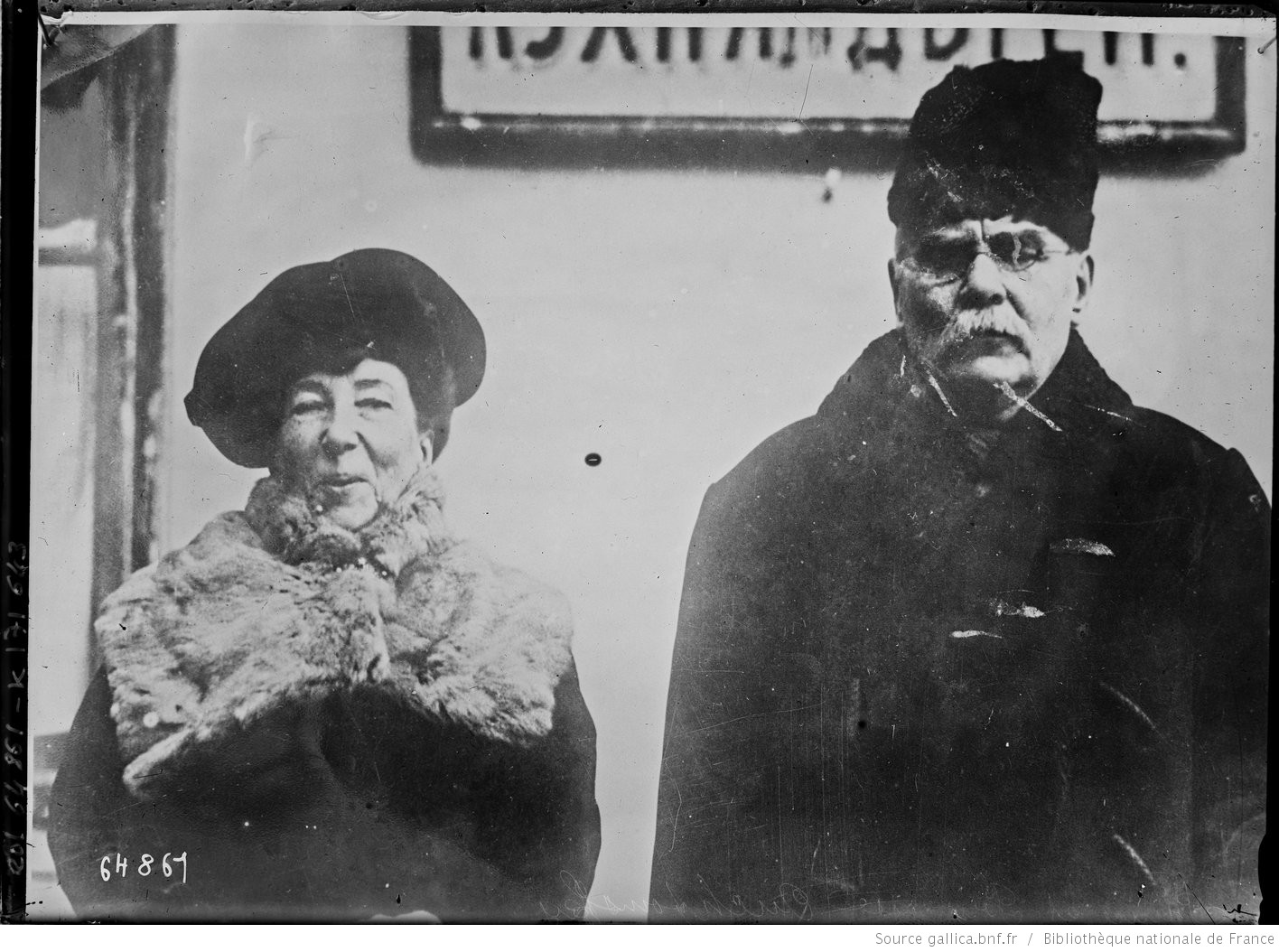
With his wife in 1921

Following the dismissal of his patron, Sergei Witte from the government, from 1903 Ukhtomsky found himself increasingly isolated. He continued to editorialise about the East for a few more years, taking an especially assertive viewpoint that the Russia should continue the war against Japan until it achieved complete victory. Although he remained active within Saint Petersburg's orientalist community, he mainly concerned himself with editing his paper, which he did until the fall of the Romanov dynasty in 1917.

He would remain an important social figure far beyond Eastern affairs and his editor's duties, becoming a household name in the house of Leo Tolstoy, and through him establishing ties with Doukhobor leader Peter Vasilevich Verigin. He would publish the works of his University teacher Vladimir Solovyov, and after the latter's death, became one of key figures of Solovyov Society that would among other issues discuss the necessity of equal rights for repressed Jews, Armenians, and Spiritual Christians, especially the Doukhobors.

He survived the revolution, and having lost his son in the First World War had to support himself and his three grandchildren by working in a number of Saint Petersburg's museums and libraries, as well as by odd translation jobs before dying in 1921. Ukhtomsky is primarily remembered for his account of Nicholas's Grand Tour and for his role in promoting Eastern affairs in Russian society in the later years of the Russian empire, as well as his art collection.

== Art collection ==
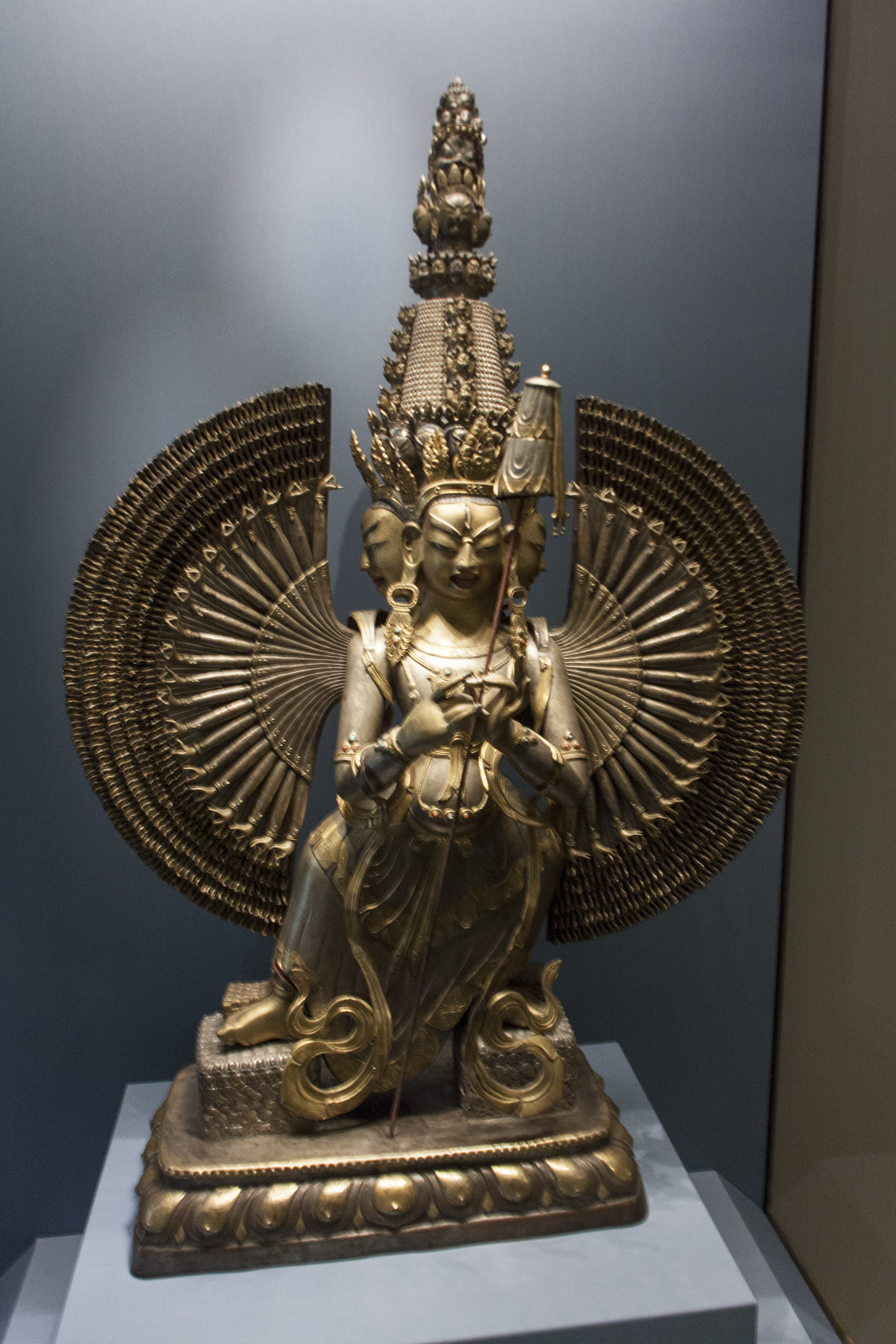
Usnisasitatapatra, Mongolian, 18th century, Hermitage Museum, from the Ukhtomsky collection

Ukhtomsky was also passionate about Oriental culture and arts. Ukhtomsky was strongly attracted to Asian art on aesthetic grounds, finding the sort of beauty that he craved. He was the standalone figure in Russian establishment to proclaim himself Buddhist. During his journeys he amassed a large collection of Chinese and Tibetan art, that eventually numbered over 2,000 pieces. They were displayed in the Alexander III Museum in Moscow (now the State Historical Museum), and were also exhibited at the Exposition Universelle in Paris in 1900, earning Ukhtomsky a gold medal.

In 1902 the collection was given to the Ethnographical Department of the Russian Museum in St. Petersburg. In 1933 it was divided between the Hermitage Museum, who received the largest and best share, and the Museum of the History of Religion, both in what was then Leningrad. The Hermitage's share remains the basis of "one of the world's largest collections of Tibetan art". Unlike most Western museums, whose collections tend to be stronger in objects from southern and western Tibet, the Ukhtomsky collection is strongest in objects from northern and eastern Tibet, making it especially valuable.

== Family ==
Ukhtomsky married Maria Vasilievna Vasilyeva, the daughter of a peasant. They had one son, Dy Esperovich Ukhtomsky (1886 - 1918), who became a Fellow of the Russian Museum in 1908. Dy Ukhtomsky married Princess Natalia Dimitrieva Tserteleva (1892–1942), daughter of philosopher and poet Prince Dimitri Nikolaevich Tsertelev (30 June 1852 - 15 August 1911) and had three children: Dmitri, Alexei (1913–1954), and Marianne (1917–1924). Dmitri (1912–1993) served as a foreign intelligence officer in Iran during World War II and later became a noted photographer and photojournalist.

== Books and articles ==
- Bukh, Alexander (2012). "National Identity and Race In Post-Revolutionary Russia: Pil'niak Travelogues From Japan and China". In Rotem Kowner & Walter Demel (eds.). Race and Racism in Modern East Asia: Western and Eastern Constructions. Leiden: Brill. pp. 177–198. ISBN 978-9004237292.
- Laruelle, Marlene L (January 2008). ""The White Tsar": Romantic Imperialism in Russia's Legitimizing of Conquering the Far East". Acta Slavica Iaponica. 25 (1): 113–134.
- Prince E. Ukhtomskii, Travels in the East of Nicholas II, Emperor of Russia When Cesarewitch 1890–1891, 2 vols., (London, 1896), II.
- E. Sarkisyanz, "Russian Attitudes towards Asia" in Russian Review, Vol. 13., No. 4 (Oct., 1954), pp. 245–254.
- D. Schimmelpenninck van der Oye, Toward the Rising Sun: Russian Ideologies of Empire and the Path to War with Japan, (Illinois, 2001)
- Khamaganova E.A. Princes Esper and Dii Ukhtomsky and Their Contribution to the Study of Buddhist Culture (Tibet, Mongolia and Russia) // Tibet, Past and Present. Tibetan Studies. PIATS. 2000: Proceedings of the Ninth Seminar of the International Tibetan Studies. Leiden, 2000. Brill, Leiden-Boston-Koln, 2002, pp. 307–326.
- Lim, Susanna Soojung (2013). China and Japan in the Russian Imagination, 1685–1922: To the Ends of the Orient. London: Routledge. ISBN 978-0415629218.
