= Samuil Dudin =

Russian ethnographer, photographer, artist and explorer

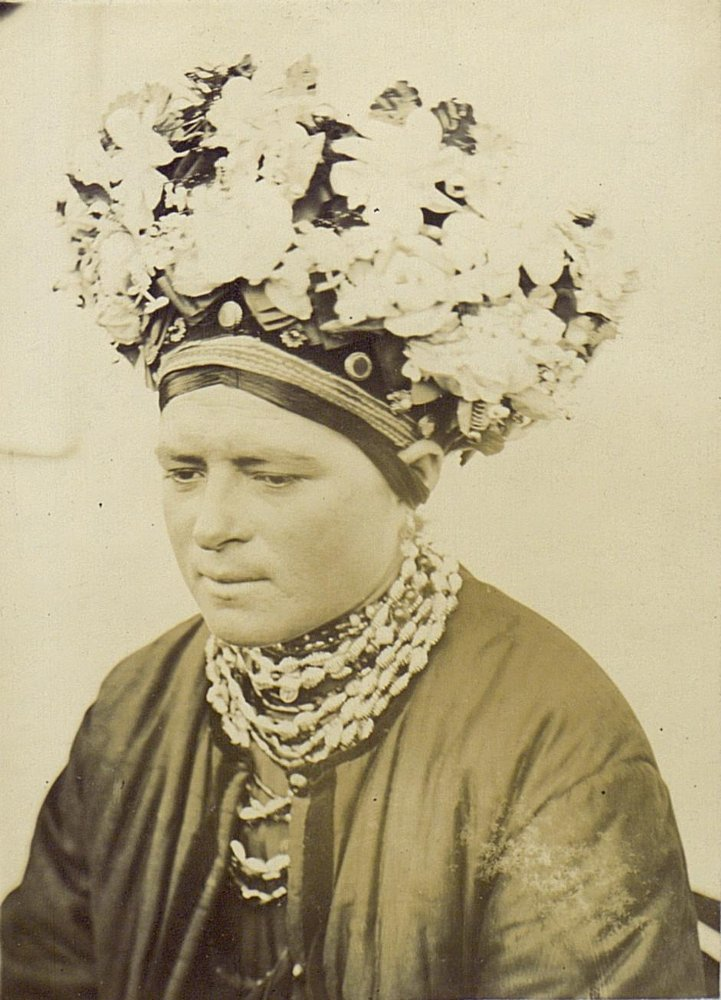
Samuel Dudin in Young

Samuil Martynovich Dudin (Russian: Самуил Мартынович Дудин, 1863–1929) was an ethnographer, photographer, artist and explorer. He was a founder of the Ethnographical Department of the Russian Museum in St. Petersburg and a member of several expeditions.

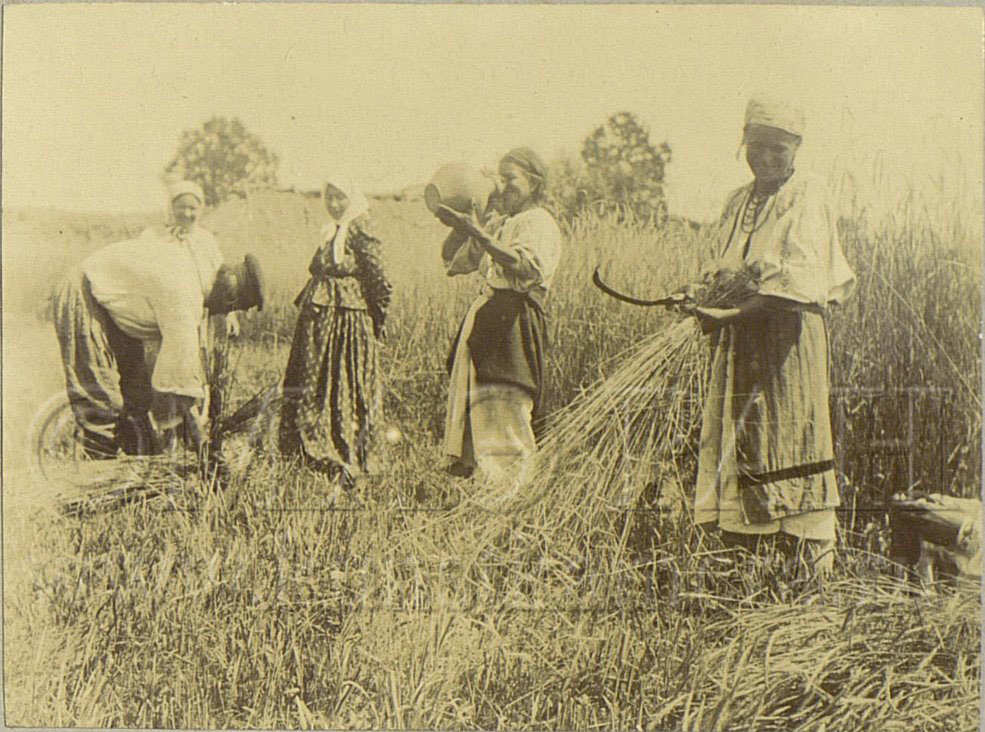
Dudin Harvesting in Poltava region, Ukraine

== Early life ==
Dudin was born in 1863 in Rivne in the Kherson Governorate of the Russian Empire (nowadays in Ukraine). His father was a village teacher and, like many other young people at that time, he became a member of a political group connected to the People's Liberty Revolution Party. He was arrested in 1884 and exiled in 1887 to Selenginsk, after which he abandoned his revolutionary activity for ever.

== Ethnographic work ==
While living in exile in Siberia, he began to collect ethnographical materials (which he later gave to the local museum) and to study photography. In 1891, he joined the Orkhon expedition led by Vasily Radloff and after his work there he was pardoned and allowed to return to St. Petersburg.

There he became a student in the Academy of Arts in the class of the painter Ilya Repin, graduating in 1898. Before this, in 1893, he had started a job in the Anthropological and Ethnological Museum in which he remained until the end of his life. At the same time, however, he worked in many other organisations connected to the museum and was a member of several expeditions – such as that led by Vasily Bartold in 1893 and by Sergey Oldenburg to Turfan in 1909-10 and Dunhuang in 1914–15. He was expedition leader of others (to Ukraine in 1894; to Samarkand in 1895; to Kazakhstan in 1899; and again to Samarkand in 1905 and 1908). From 1914 until his death in 1929, he was a keeper in the museum's Department of Antiquities of the Orient and Western Turkestan. He produced a great amount of material from each expedition – photographs of the finds and sketches of ethnographical and archaeological objects. This material is now in the collections of many St. Petersburg museums, but is still only partially published.

The photographs are especially interesting. Of particular importance are his photographs of Central Asia taken in the Samarkand region between 1900 and 1902. On Oldenburg's expedition to Dunhuang, Dudin took about 2,000 photographs, sketches and paintings. Many of these materials, classified by Dudin himself, have been published by the Shanghai Ancient Books Publishing House.

As well as acting as photographer on the expeditions, Dudin also researched and published on the architectural remains and art of Central Asia.

In 1902, Dudin founded the Ethnographical Department of the Russian Museum in St. Petersburg (now an independent museum). The dedication in an issue of the museum's bulletin to his memory reads:

Dudin was the first collector of material for the Ethnographical Department and also donated a large number of artefacts from his own collections, especially in its early days. Between 1900 and 1909, he aimed at making a collections of archaeological, ethnographical and photographic records of the peoples of Central Asia, including the Turks, Uzbeks and Kirghiz.

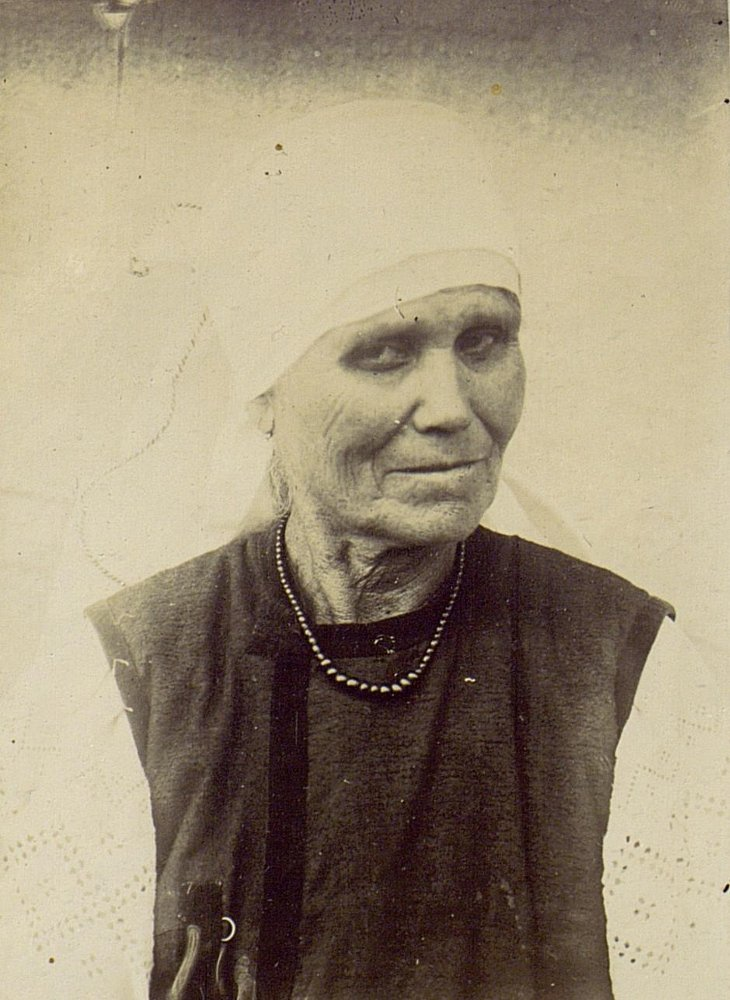
Dudin Old Woman from Poltava region

In the same volume Bartold said of Dudin:

In general ... S. M. [Dudin] was prepared to fulfill his task [his expedition work], even more so than myself. When I prepared my expedition account, I not only used his photographs, rubbings, drafts and other materials, but also repeated descriptions of many relics from his own records which were placed by him at my full disposal. This even included descriptions of relics seen by us both. The main object of S. M.'s thoughts was really the art. In his opinion, acceptance of a painter's work for the Itinerant Exhibition must be the first step on the path to fame, and he did not rate the ruling school of the Russian Academy of Arts. When the 'Itinerant School' became prominent in the Academy he became a student of the famous studio of Ilya Repin. I remember that Academician W. W. Radlov was delighted with S. M.'s actions in choosing to continue of his own free will at the studio for over a year after finishing his formal education and receiving his degree.

And Oldenburg wrote:

Samuil Martynovich Dudin holds a particular place in the history of Central Asian research. He was a perspective artist, attentive observer, archaeologist and ethnographer ... His large collections joined our museum's exhibition material and, at the same time, with his pen, pencil, brush and camera he created a most valuable and plentiful archive of extremely accurate reproductions of archaeological and ethnographical objects. Therefore, it is not an overstatement to assert that, without Dudin's materials, then many of the decisive results in Central Asian research would not have been made.

Dudin's numerous collections are to be found in many museums in Russia, Siberia and Ukraine.
