= Dūda =

Latvian bowed string instrument

The dūda is a Latvian bowed string instrument made out of a thin wooden board pulled into a crescent shape by 2 to 3 catgut strings. A pig bladder is fixed between the board and the strings, acting like a resonator.
