= Ōtsu incident =

Failed assassination attempt on Nicholas II

Coordinates: 35°00′25″N 135°51′53″E

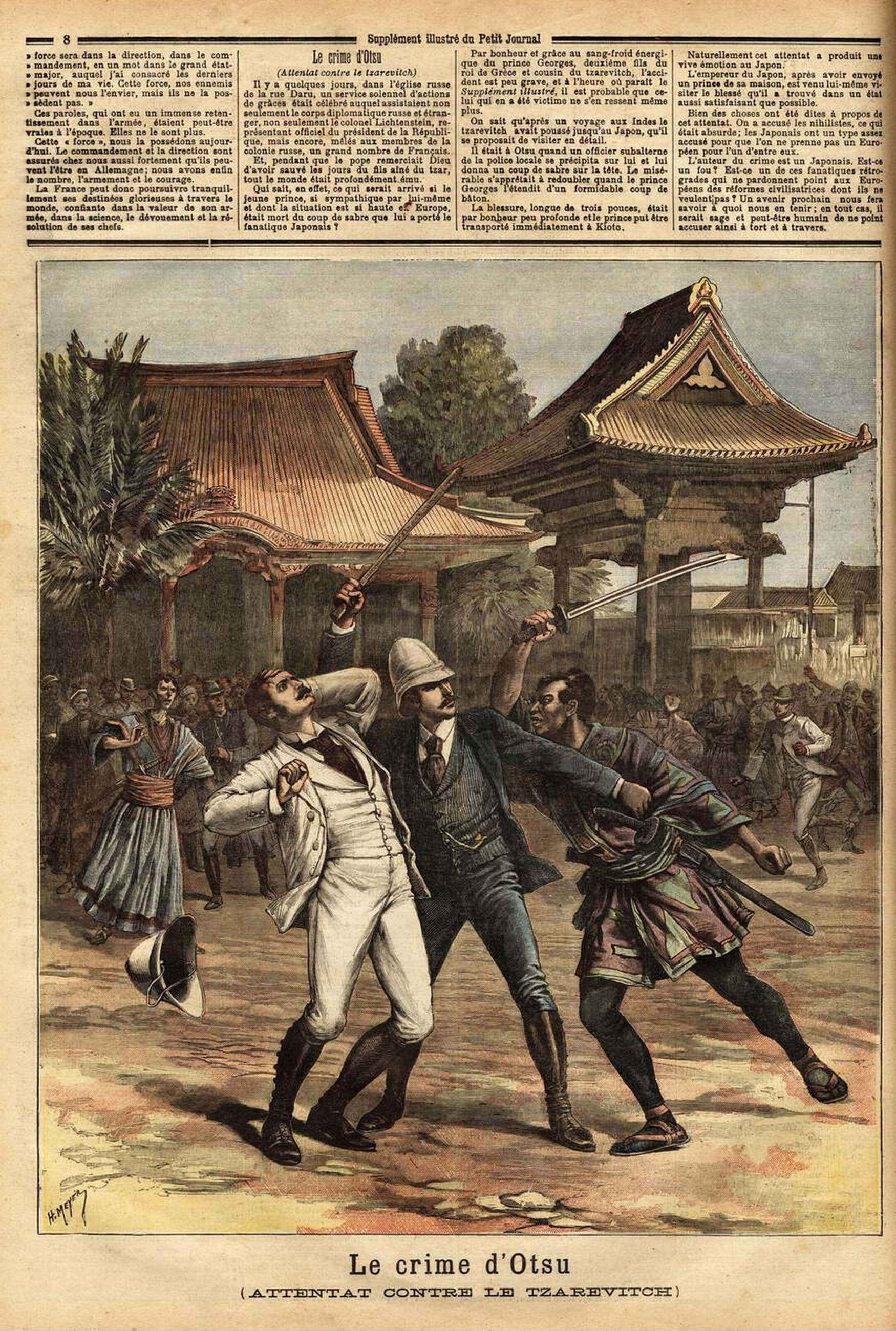
Gravure depicting the attempted assassination of Nicholas II of Russia in Ōtsu, Japan, by Henri Meyer, Paris, Le Petit Journal, 30 May 1891 issue

The Ōtsu incident (Japanese: 大津事件, Hepburn: Ōtsu Jiken) was an unsuccessful assassination attempt on Nicholas Alexandrovich, Tsarevich of Russia (later Emperor Nicholas II of Russia) on 11 May [O.S. 29 April] 1891, during his visit to Japan as part of his eastern journey.

== Background ==
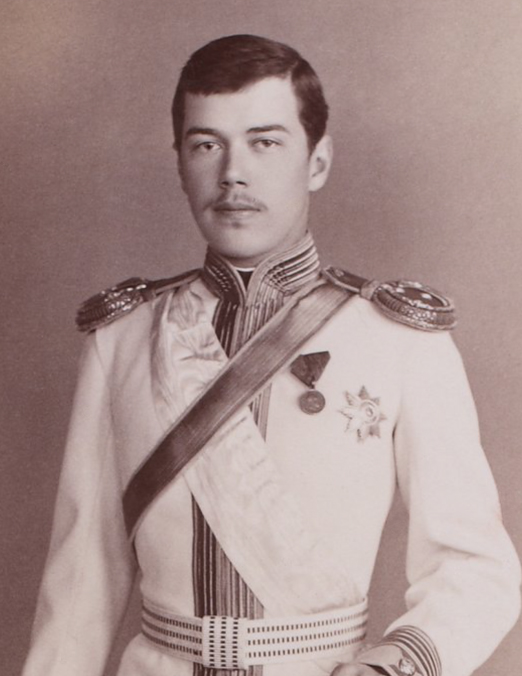
Nicholas Alexandrovich, Tsarevich of Russia

Tsarevich Nicholas had traveled by sea to Vladivostok in Far Eastern Russia for ceremonies marking the start of construction of the Trans-Siberian Railroad. A visit to Japan formed part of this trip. The Russian Pacific Fleet, with the Tsarevich on board, stopped in Kagoshima, then Nagasaki, and then finally Kobe.

From Kobe, the Tsarevich journeyed overland to Kyoto, where he was personally met by a high-level delegation spearheaded by Japanese Prince Arisugawa Taruhito. This was the first visit to the region by such a figure since Prince Heinrich of Prussia visited in 1880, and the British Princes George and Albert in 1881. At the time of the Tsarevich's visit, the military influence of the Russian Empire was growing rapidly in the Far East, viewed as the catalyst responsible for prompting the Japanese government to place heavy emphasis on this visit, principally to foster better Russo-Japanese relations.

Nicholas showed interest in the Japanese traditional crafts and reportedly received a dragon tattoo on his right arm. Nicholas had read Pierre Loti's Madame Chrysanthème before arriving in Nagasaki, and in imitation of a character in that text, Loti also had a dragon tattooed on his right arm. Nicholas is also thought to have bought an ornamental hairpin for a Japanese girl of unknown status.

== Attack ==
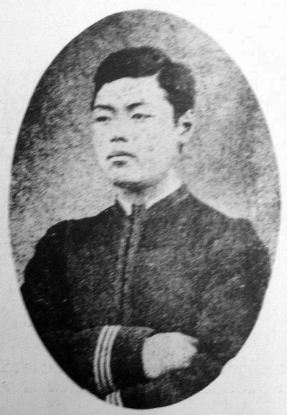
The Tsarevich's attacker, the policeman Tsuda Sanzō

The assassination attempt occurred on 11 May [O.S. 29 April] 1891 while Nicholas was returning to Kyoto after a day trip to Lake Biwa in Ōtsu, Shiga Prefecture. He was attacked by Tsuda Sanzō (1855–1891), one of his escorting policemen, who swung at the Tsarevich's face with a sabre. The quick action of Nicholas' cousin, Prince George of Greece and Denmark, who parried the second blow with his cane, saved his life. Tsuda then attempted to flee, but two rickshaw drivers in Nicholas's entourage chased him down and pulled him to the ground. Nicholas was left with a 9 cm scar on the right side of his forehead. His wound was not life-threatening but caused excruciating headaches for the rest of his life.

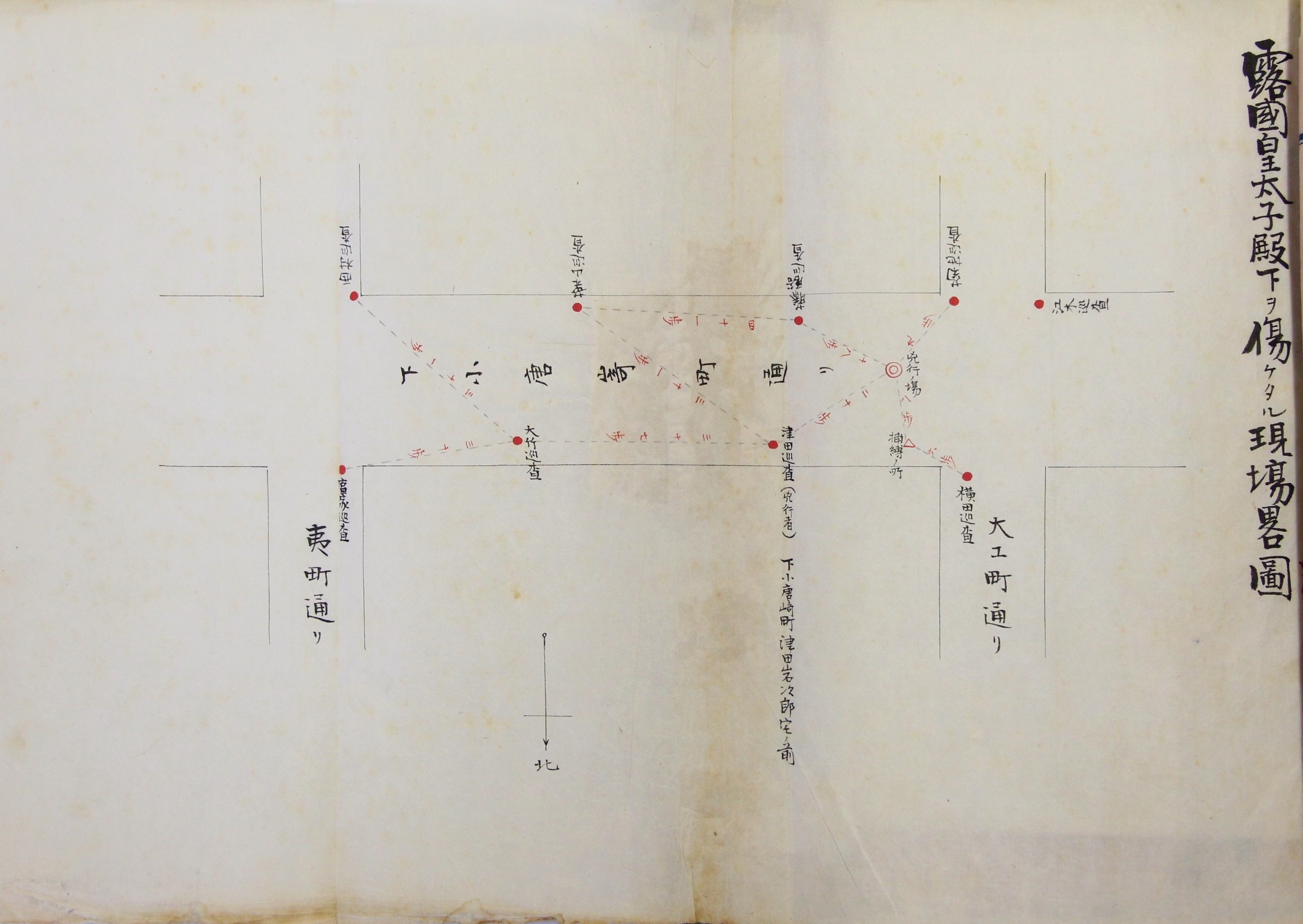
Sketch map of the scene of the wounding of the Crown Prince of Russia, Japanese police record of the Ōtsu incident, May 1891

Nicholas was rushed back to Kyoto, where Prince Kitashirakawa Yoshihisa ordered that he be taken into the Kyoto Imperial Palace to rest, and messages were sent to Tokyo. Fearful that the incident would be used by Russia as a pretext for war, and knowing that Japan's military was no match for Russia at the time, Prime Minister Matsukata Masayoshi advised Emperor Meiji to go immediately to visit the Tsarevich. Meiji boarded a train at Shimbashi Station and traveled through the night to reach Kyoto the following morning. The following day, when Nicholas expressed a desire to return to the Russian fleet at Kobe, Meiji ordered Prince Kitashirakawa and Prince Arisugawa Takehito to accompany him.

== Aftermath ==
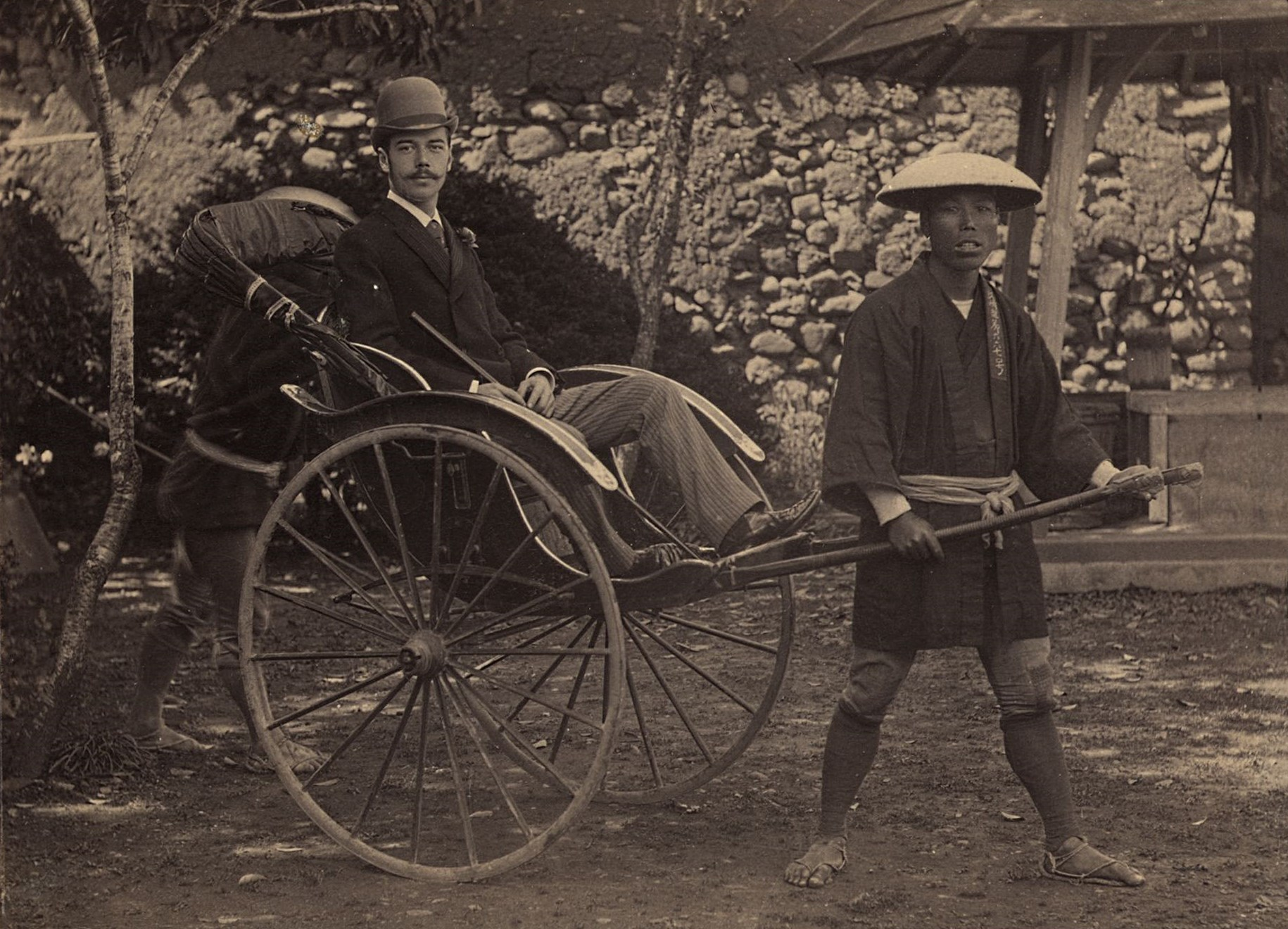
Tsarevich Nicholas in Nagasaki.

Emperor Meiji publicly expressed sorrow at Japan's lack of hospitality towards a state guest, which led to an outpouring of public support and messages of condolences for the Tsarevich.

More than 10,000 telegrams were sent wishing the Tsarevich a speedy recovery. Sanzō's home town in the Yamagata Prefecture even legally forbade the use of the family name "Tsuda" and the given name "Sanzō". When Nicholas cut his trip to Japan short in spite of Emperor Meiji's apology, a young seamstress, Yuko Hatakeyama (畠山勇子), slit her throat with a razor in front of the Kyoto Prefectural Office as an act of public contrition, and soon died in a hospital. Japanese media at the time labeled her as "retsujo" (lit. valiant woman) and praised her patriotism.

=== Justice ===
The government applied pressure to the court to try Tsuda under Article 116 of the Criminal Code, which demanded the death penalty for acts against the emperor, empress or crown prince of Japan. However, Chief Justice Kojima Korekata ruled that Article 116 did not apply in this case, and sentenced Tsuda to life imprisonment instead. Although controversial at the time, Kojima's decision was later used as an example of the independence of the judiciary in Japan.

Accepting responsibility for the lapse in security, Home Minister Saigō Tsugumichi and Foreign Minister Aoki Shūzō resigned.

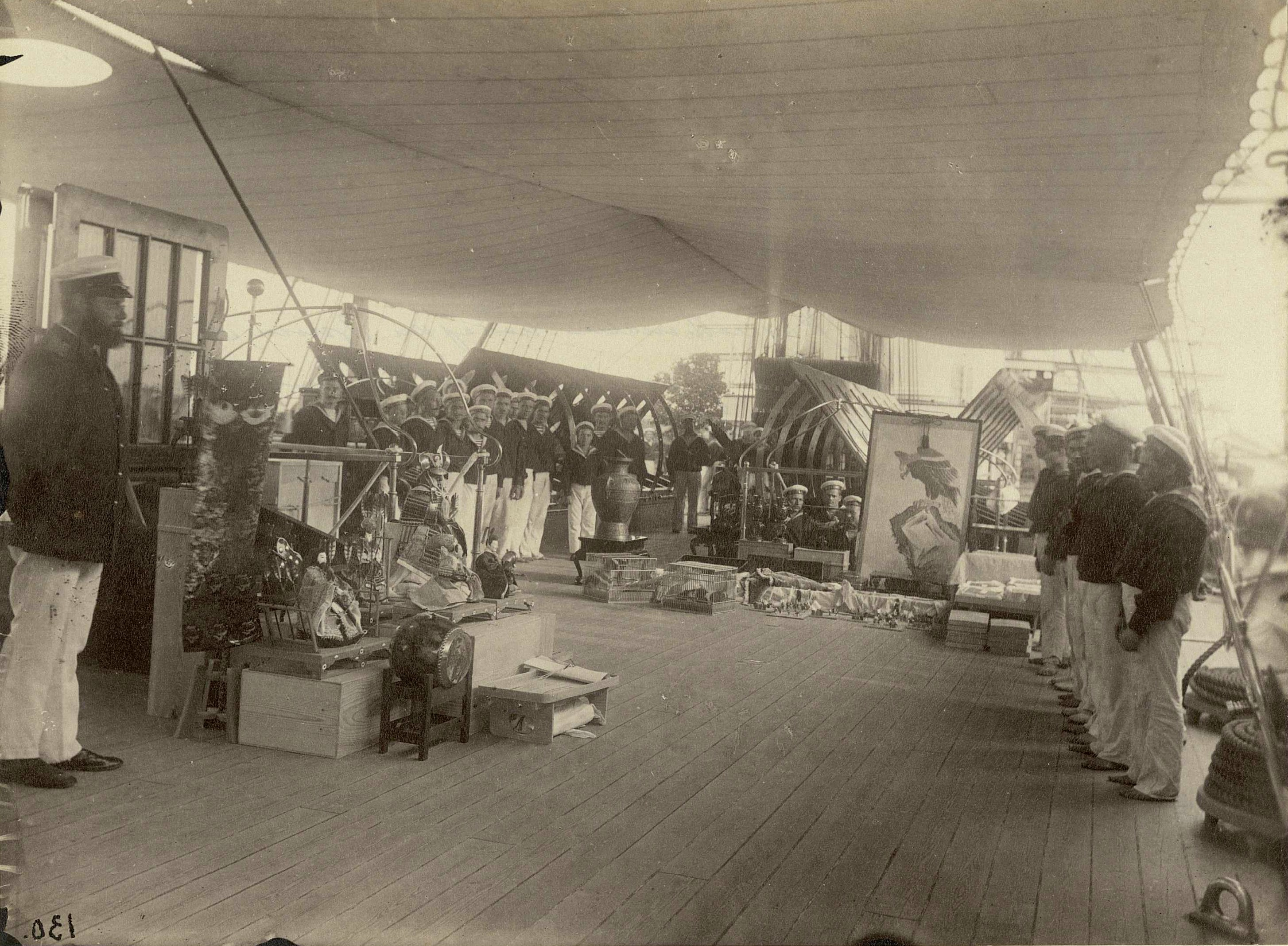
Japanese gifts for Nicholas II, loaded aboard the Pamiat Azova

The Russian government officially expressed full satisfaction in the outcome of Japan's actions, and indeed formally stated that had Tsuda been sentenced to death, they would have pushed for clemency. Later historians have often speculated on how the incident, which left the Tsarevich Nicholas permanently scarred and also gave him painful headaches, may have later influenced Nicholas's opinion of Japan and the Japanese. As a result, this may have influenced his decisions in the process up to and during the Russo-Japanese War of 1904–1905.

The former policeman was sent to Abashiri Prison, in Hokkaidō, and died of an illness in September of the same year. Tsuda's motivation for the attack remains unclear, with explanations ranging from mental derangement to hatred of foreigners.

== Later events ==
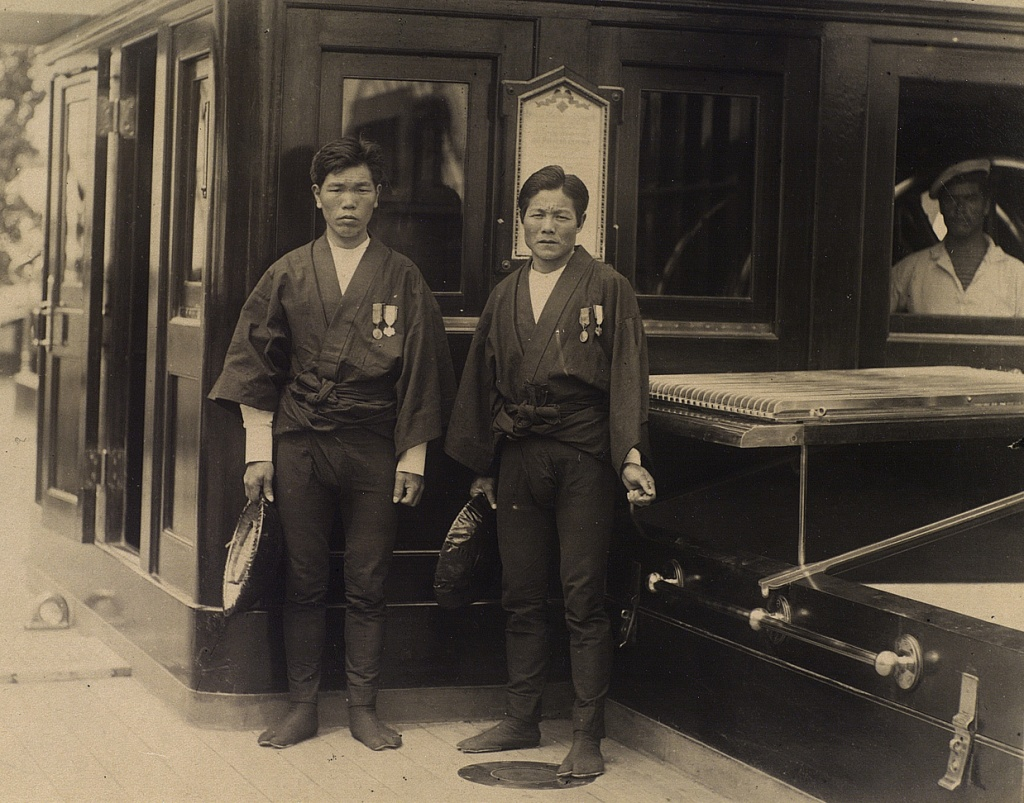
The two Japanese rickshaw drivers who saved Nicholas from death during the Ōtsu incident, flashing their medals awarded for apprehending the would-be assassin.

- The rickshaw drivers who captured Tsuda, Mukaihata Jizaburo (1854–1928) and Kitagaichi Ichitaro (1859–1914) were later called to the Russian fleet by the Tsarevich, where they were feted by the Russian marines, given medals, and a reward of 2,500 yen plus an additional 1,000 yen pension, which was a tremendous sum for the time. They were celebrated in the media as national heroes. However, during the Russo-Japanese War, the admiration of their friends and neighbors turned sour, they lost their pensions, were accused of being spies, and had to suffer harassment from the police.
- In 1993, when the Russian government was attempting to verify whether or not bone fragments recovered from the Ipatiev House belonged to Tsar Nicholas II, a sample of the Tsar's DNA was required. Relics from the Ōtsu incident were examined to see if enough blood stains were present to make a positive identification possible, but the results were not conclusive.
