= Duda =

Duda may refer to:

== Arts and entertainment ==
=== Musical instruments ===
- Duda (bagpipe), a Hungarian bagpipe
- Dūda, a Latvian bowed string instrument
- Dūdas, a Latvian bagpipe instrument

=== Film and television ===
- La duda, a Mexican telenovella
- La duda (1967 TV series)
- The Doubt (Spanish: La duda), a 1972 Spanish drama film

== People ==
- Duda (name), a unisex given name and surname, including a list of people with the name and nickname
  - Duda (footballer, born 1947), born José Francisco Leandro Filho, Brazilian forward
  - Duda (footballer, born 1968), born Edmilton Conceição dos Santos, Brazilian forward
  - Duda (footballer, born 1974), born Carlos Eduardo Ventura, Brazilian football forward
  - Duda (footballer, born 1980), born Sérgio Paulo Barbosa Valente, Portuguese football midfielder
  - Duda (footballer, born 1988), born Carlos Eduardo Schneider, Brazilian football forward
  - Duda (footballer, born 1994), born Eduardo Haas Gehlen, Brazilian football defender
- Dūda (surname), a Baltic surname, including a list of people with the name

== Places ==
- Duda, a village in Subcetate Commune, Harghita County, Romania
- Duda, a village in Duda-Epureni Commune, Vaslui County, Romania
- Duda Mică and Duda Mare, tributaries of the Brătei river in Romania

== See also ==
- Doodah (disambiguation)
- Dudda (disambiguation)
