= Paul Duda =

Canadian football player (born 1943)

No. 20, 28
- Position: Halfback

Personal information
- Born: December 8, 1943 (age 82)
- Listed height: 5 ft 11 in (1.80 m)
- Listed weight: 196 lb (89 kg)

Career information
- High school: Watertown (Watertown, New York)
- College: Cortland State

Career history
- Hamilton Tiger-Cats (1965); Norfolk Neptunes (1965–1969); Orlando Panthers (1970)

Paul Leroy Duda (born December 8, 1943) is an American former professional football player who played for the Hamilton Tiger-Cats. He played college football at Cortland State University. He played in one game for the Tiger-Cats in 1965 and finished the season with the Norfolk Neptunes of the Continental Football League. Duda continued to play for the Neptunes through the 1969 season. He ended his pro career with the Orlando Panthers of the Atlantic Coast Football League in 1970.
