= Eastern journey of Nicholas II =

1890–1891 tour of Eurasia

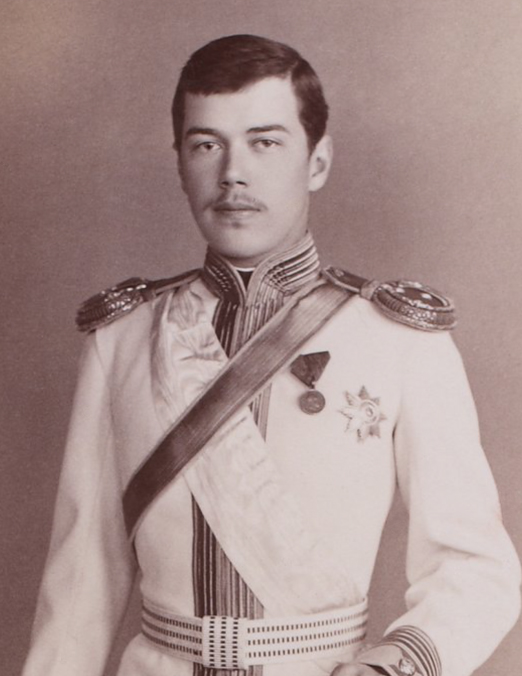
Nicholas Alexandrovich, Tsesarevich of Russia

The Eastern journey of Nicholas II in 1890–1891 was a journey made by Nicholas Alexandrovich–then Tsesarevich of Russia–around the greater part of the Eurasian continent.

The total length of the journey exceeded 51,000 kilometres, including 15,000 km of railway and 22,000 km of sea routes. During his visit to the Empire of Japan, Nicholas was the target of a failed assassination attempt.

== Background ==
After the Grand Embassy of Peter the Great, a long trip for educational purposes became an important part of training for the state activity of the members of the Russian Imperial house. In 1890, Emperor Alexander III of Russia decided to establish the Trans-Siberian Railway and his heir Tsesarevich Nicholas took part in the opening ceremony.

== Voyage ==
Cruiser "Memory of Azov"

On 23 October, after a church service in Gatchina, the Tsesarevich went by train via Vienna, Austria to Trieste, Italy where he boarded the cruiser Pamiat Azova (Memory of Azov). This route was selected because of probable diplomatic difficulties with the Ottoman Empire, which wanted to keep the straits of Bosporus and Dardanelles closed.

From Trieste the expedition came to the port Piraeus, where Nicholas met his uncle King George I of Greece and his godmother Queen Olga of Greece, born a Grand Duchess of Russia. Their son Prince George of Greece and Denmark was included into the flagship's crew as an officer. From Greece the Tsesarevich sailed to Port Said in Egypt. While his ship passed through the Suez Canal, Nicholas with his retinue travelled along the Nile, going upriver to Aswan.

From Suez, they went to Aden. On 11 December, they arrived in Bombay where Nicholas started a long trans-Indian trip, which ended in Colombo, Ceylon. In India, Nicholas visited many important places, including the Taj Mahal and the Harimandir Sahib (Golden Temple) and bought numerous exotic works of art, later transferred to several Russian museums.

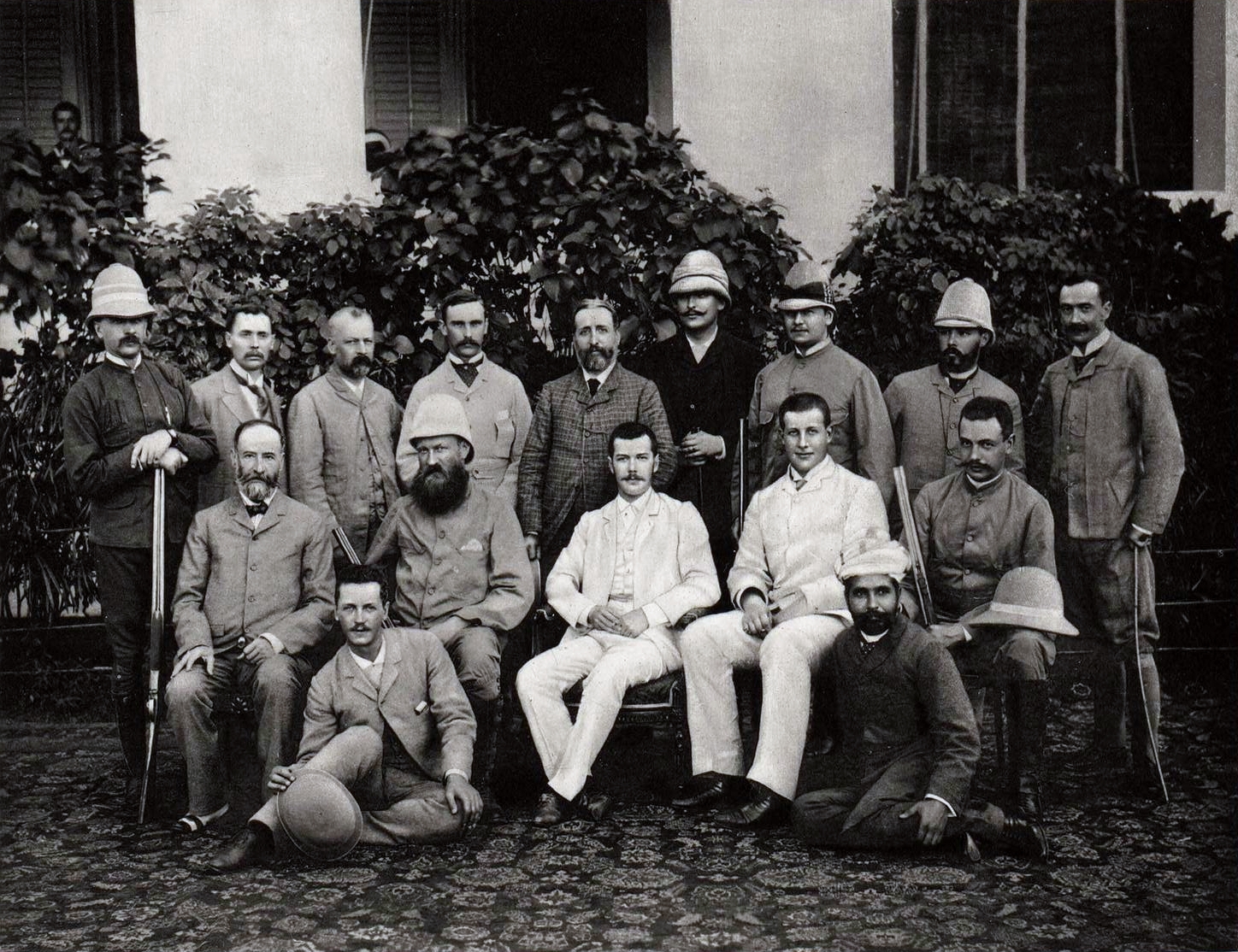
Nicholas II in Madras, India, 1890.

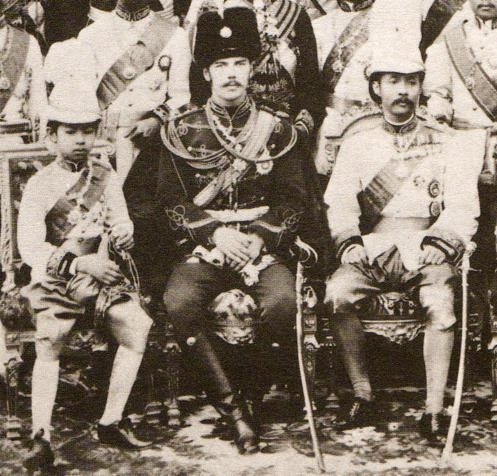
Tsesarevich Nicholas Alexandrovich in Siam with Crown Prince Maha Vajirunhis (left) and King Chulalongkorn (right), March 1891

Leaving Ceylon on 31 January, the expedition continued to Singapore, the island of Java in Dutch East Indies and Bangkok. In Siam the future Emperor spent a week as a guest of King Rama V. Nicholas received an Order and precious gifts. On 13 March, he reached Hankow in China, where he visited tea plantations and factories.

On 15 April 1891, accompanied by six ships of the Imperial Russian Navy, Nicholas arrived in the Empire of Japan. The Russian Pacific Fleet with the Tsesarevich first called on Kagoshima, then Nagasaki, and then Kobe. From Kobe, the Tsesarevich went to Kyoto, where he was met by a delegation headed by Prince Arisugawa Taruhito. Prince Nicholas showed interest in the Japanese traditional crafts, had a dragon-shaped tattoo on his right forearm, and bought an ornamental hairpin for a Japanese passer-by. On 29 April, in Ōtsu, he was attacked by one of the Japanese police escort. The Japanese government apologised profusely, and Emperor Meiji himself came to accompany Nicholas back to the Russian ships.

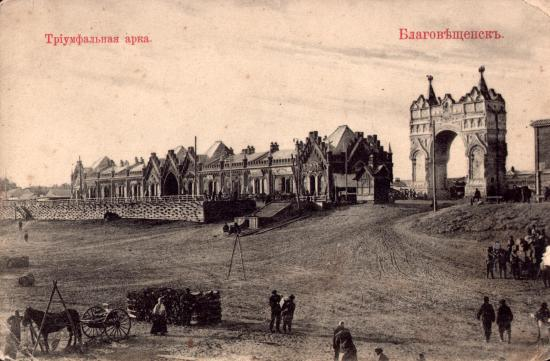
Triumphal Arch erected in Blagoveshchensk in 1891, in honour of the visiting Tsarevich

On 7 May Nicholas left Kobe, and four days later arrived in Vladivostok, where he accomplished the official part of his mission. This leg of the journey was on the steam yacht St George of the Royal Yacht Squadron in the company of its owner, Ernest Wythes, of Copped Hall. He then returned across the entire length of Russia back to Saint Petersburg. He travelled overland and by river boat via Khabarovka, Blagoveshchensk, Nerchinsk, Chita, Irkutsk, Tomsk, Surgut, Tobolsk, Tara, Omsk, and Orenburg, and then returned by train to St. Petersburg. A number of Siberian cities erected triumphal arches to celebrate the visit of the future emperor.

=== Timeline ===
- 4 November [O.S. 23 October] 1890: departure from Gatchina;
- 7 November [O.S. 26 October] 1890: departure from Trieste;
- 22 November [O.S. 10 November] 1890–10 December [O.S. 28 November] 1890: visiting of Egypt;
- 23 December [O.S. 11 December] 1890: arrival to Bombay;
- 23 December [O.S. 11 December] 1890–12 January 1891 [O.S. 31 December 1890]: voyage in India
  - Bombay;
  - Agra;
  - Lahore;
  - Amritsar;
  - Benares;
  - Calcutta;
  - Bombay;
  - Madras;
- 11 January 1891 [O.S. 30 December 1890]: arrival to Ceylon;
- 11 February [O.S. 30 January] 1891: departure from Colombo;
- 19 March [O.S. 7 March] 1891: arrival to Bangkok;
- 25 March [O.S. 13 March] 1891: departure from Bangkok;
- 4 April [O.S. 23 March] 1891: arrival to Hong Kong;
- 21 April [O.S. 9 April] 1891: arrival to Wuhan
- 27 April [O.S. 15 April] 1891: arrival to Nagasaki, Japan;
- 11 May [O.S. 29 April] 1891: Otsu Scandal;
- 18 May [O.S. 6 May] 1891: celebration of the 23rd birthday of Nicholas in Osaka;
- 19 May [O.S. 7 May] 1891: departure from Kobe;
- 23 May [O.S. 11 May] 1891: arrival to Vladivostok;
- 2 June [O.S. 21 May] 1891: departure from Vladivostok;
- 16 August [O.S. 4 August] 1891: arrival to St. Petersburg;

== Significance ==
Prince Esper Ukhtomsky also took part in the journey, and collected important ethnographic notes about the places he visited. Later he published an illustrated three-volume story of this voyage. More than 200 photos were taken by Vladimir Mendeleyev, a son of Dmitry Mendeleyev, who was a member of the Memory of Azov crew.

== Commemoration ==
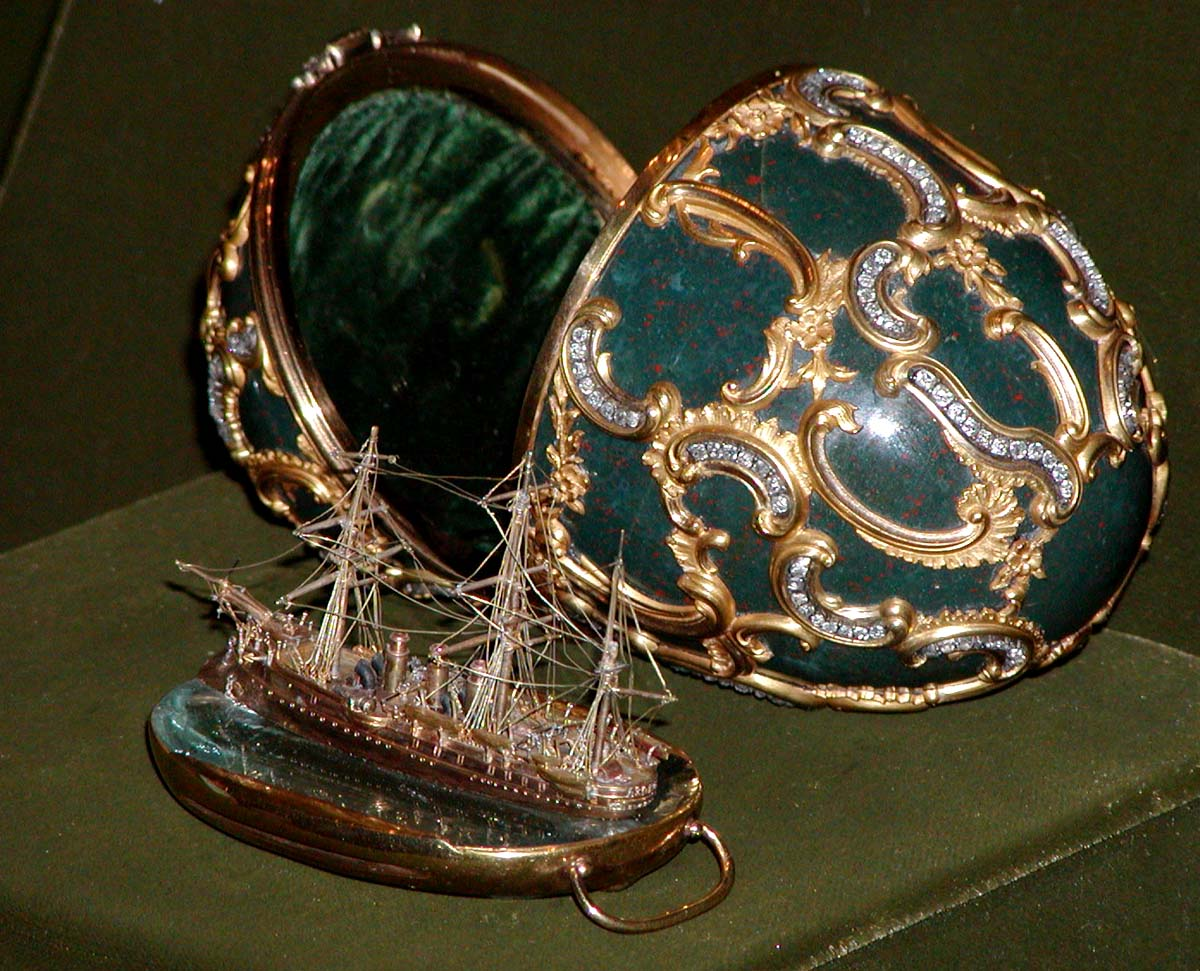
Memory of Azov Egg

- The Memory of Azov (Fabergé egg) has a miniature replica of the cruiser Memory of Azov.

== See also ==
- Grand Tour

== Bibliography ==
- (in Russian) E. E. Ukhtomsky Eastern journey of His Imperial Majesty Tsarevich in 1890–1891, 1893–1897. (translated into English, French, and German shortly afterwards, English translation title is Hesper Ookhtomsky (Ukhtomskii). Travels in the East of Nicholas II, emperor of Russia when cesarewitch, 1890-1891 / Written by order of His Imperial Majesty; and tr. from the Russian by R. Goodlet; edited by Sir George Birdwood. Westminster: Constable 1900.
