= Harry Duda =

Polish writer

Harry Alfred Piotr Duda (born 29 October 1944) is a Polish poet and publicist. He is Master of Polish Philology and a retired captain of the Polish Army (Infantry Commander).

== Biography ==
Harry Alfred Piotr Duda was born in Košetice on 29 October 1944. He attended the Elementary School No. 3 and Adam Mickiewicz Secondary School in Prudnik (1962). In 1962, he began his superior studies in Opole, Poland, where he lives to this day and owns the title of Meritorious Citizen of the City of Opole.

Being an editor of student monthly Fama (at Superior School of Pedagogy) and a participant of the March Events 1968, he became a victim of a contemporary press campaign and other trouble in his later professional life.

In 1968 he graduated from the Superior School of Pedagogy in Opole, and the subject of his thesis was the science-fiction literature of Stanisław Lem. Five years later, he graduated from the College of Nature's Protection at the Academy of Agriculture in Kraków, Poland (1973).

After his graduation he worked for two years as an educator in a boarding-school, then for four years in the Polish Economic Society, and the League for the Preservation of Nature social organizations. For the next 36 years, he was employed in the teachers' system of improvement in Opole (the Centre of Improvement had various names, their abbreviations were: IKNiBO, IKN-ODN, ODN, WOM) as an editor of educational publications; he started as a secretary of the editorial staff of Opole Teacher's Quarterly (1970–1990) and then became editor-in-chief of New School Bulletin (1992–2008).

As of 2017, he is a retired teacher with diploma.

== Work ==
He made his debut in 1964 as a poet in Radio Opole and in the newspaper Trybuna Opolska, and as a journalist in Słowo Powszechne, for which he was a field correspondent from 1964 to 1966. He contributed to the next papers and magazines: Słowo Powszechne, Trybuna Odrzańska, Trybuna Opolska, Gazeta Raciborska (its editor-in-chief, 1991–1992), Opole, Wczoraj, Dzisiaj, Jutro; member of editorial staff of Opole Calendar. He collaborated steadily with Radio Opole for 17 years altogether: from 1977 to 1981 he worked for the Music Section – together with editors Stanisław Śmiełowski (died in 2008) and Edward Spyrka – and from 1994 to 2005 he directed with Ewa Lubowiecka (died in 2011) his original programme Glossatorium; so he was an author and co-author of about one thousand radio programmes.

His works (included in more than 130 papers and magazines and in complete editions) contain about 1700 publications and there are over 800 publications of other authors treating about him and his creation. He wrote and edited a monumental work (almost ten thousand verses) entitled Jesus Christ. Poetical Vision of Four Gospels, dedicated to Pope John Paul II for the second Millennium of Christianity and gave him in Rome on 22 December 1999. The second edition was published by Wydawnictwo Cywilizacji Miłości (with the acceptance of Church authority) in Opole in 2012.

Moreover, he published St. John's Apocalypse Versified based on New Testament. He also writes poetical versions of Old Testament books. He rendered in this way all didactic (i. e. the sapiential) books, including the Book of Psalms, and moreover Genesis and Exodus. Some of these works were printed. The total volume of his versified biblical books contains about fifty thousand verses.

Duda was also engaged in the popularization of sciences, such as protection of nature, ecological ethics, philosophy of medicine and medical deontology. He collaborated for many years with world famous haematologist, professor of medicine Julian Aleksandrowicz (died in 1988) from Kraków – they were joint authors of the book On the Threshold of the Future Medicine (1st edition by Państwowy Zakład Wydawnictw Lekarskich, Warsaw 1988). He was active together with professor of psychology Stanisław Rogala form Opole (died in 2015) in the comprehensive field of gerontology – as a lecturer during scientific conferences set up at the Superior School Management and Administration in Opole, and as a co-author of subsequent publications; he was also a co-author of the complete works edited by professor of soft sciences Adam A. Zych from Wrocław.

As an Opole Katyń Family's associate he travelled in June 1992 to the places of the Poles' martyrdom in Russia (Twer, Ostashkov, Miednoje, Katyń) and wrote three books about Katyn massacre: Following the Route of Crime – Ostashkov, Twer, Miednoje (literary report); Following the Route of Crime II. Opole's Inhabitants in the Katyń Cause (literary report and essays, with the preface written by Prelate Zdzisław J. Peszkowski); Chopped off the Trunk (poems published for the 70th anniversary of the Katyń Crime, the preface by the Marshal of Opole Voivodeship). The text of his Katyń prayer is written on the commemorative plaque (engraved by Marian Nowak) placed in Opole Cathedral (in the Chapel of John the Good).

Duda's poem entitled Katyń Triptych is included in the international poetical anthology Katyń in Literature (1st edition by Norbertinum, Lublin 1995). As an associate the Chaplain of the Katyń Families and the Murdered in the East Prelate Zdzisław Aleksander Jastrzębiec Peszkowski (died in 2007) Harry Duda wrote the charters of foundations for the Polish war cemeteries in Katyń and Miednoje (1995) and the epitaphs on the plates covering the corner stones – consecrated by Pope John Paul II – of these cemeteries.

In June 1995 he participated in the ceremony in Katyń – the laying of the foundation stone of the local Polish War Cemetery.

In September 2000 he took part in the opening ceremony of the Polish War Cemetery in Mednoye – as a guest member of the Polish Parliament and Government's delegation. Invited by the Marshal of Polish Parliament on 28 September 2006 he participated in the international conference dealing with the Katyń subject. As a publicist he popularized the Katyń Crime in many local press and radio publications, he did it abroad, too, in 2000 and 2003, during meetings with Polish emigrants in the states of New York (in Polish Consulate in New York City in 2000), New Jersey and Pennsylvania, as well as many times among the Poles living in the region of Trans-Olza (Czech Republic), in Székesfehérvár in Hungary (in 1998 during the visit of the Opole writers' delegation) and in Germany (Saarbrücken, 1993).

He was a member of the Honorary Committee Commemorating the 60th Anniversary of the Katyń Crime in 2000.

A member of the Polish Writers' Union since 1977. Many times its secretary and vice-chairman in the space of 25 years, from 1990 to 2002 chairman of the Opole Section of the Union (three tenures); member of the Head Board of the Union from 1997 to 2000. He is a member of the Warsaw Section of the Polish Writers' Union since 2002.

He published and edited more than sixty literary books of Opole authors in the Publishing House Wers which he founded and directed (as a volunteer) at the Opole section of the Polish Writers' Union from 1989 to 2002 (it was a unique so expansive enterprise of strictly literary kind in the history of Opole). A charter member of the Upper Silesia Literary Society in Katowice (1991) and a member of its Board for one tenure.

For many years he belonged to the Artistic Associations' Club in Opole (no more existing), was a member of the board and of the Revisory Commission and a vice-chairman for artistic matters from 1990 to 1993. For many years he was a member of the Board of the Opole Cultural and Educational Society (no more existing) and a chief of its Commission for the Nature's Protection. He was secretary and vice-president of the Voivodeship Board of the League for the Preservation of Nature from 1972 to 1994. A member of the Voivodeship Commission for the Preservation of Nature at Opole Voivode (three tenures since 1994). The Voivodeship Inspector of Nature's Guard in Opole from 1978 to 1986.

He initiated and organized twenty so-called poetical plein-airs (from 1973 to 1990), also in Polish national parks. His poems resulting from them were printed later in the richly illustrated publications edited by the National Parks in Ojców and in Wolin, moreover they were included to the files of other national parks.

Duda focused his poetry also on the martyrdom of the prisoner of war in Opole Silesia. As a many years' precursor and organizer of the mentioned above so-called poetical plein-airs he arranged XXth Poetical Plein-Air Opole-Łambinowice in July 1998 (together with the Central Museum of the Prisoners of War in Opole - Section in Łambinowice). This event resulted in poems (his own too) printed afterwards in the book entitled Patience at the Cross-roads. These are very few contemporary poetical texts about the former POW camp in Łambinowice (besides so-called camp poetry written by prisoners).

He edited significant poetical anthology Against Violence published by the Central Museum of the Prisoners of War in Opole and Łambinowice; the book contains mainly Opole writers but also from abroad, and the poems are strongly based on the memory of the Poles' battles and martyrdom.

He made a literary adaptation of Apolinary Oliwa's diary entitled When the Knives Were Consecrated (published by the Opole Cultural and Educational Society, 1973) that describes the history of self-defence in the village Rafałówka and in the district of Kiwerce in Volhynia Region on Ukraina (A. Oliwa was a commander of the self-defence unit) where Polish community had to be protected against crimes of the Ukrainian nationalists in time of II World War. It was the first publication of this kind (in respect of subject) in Opole voivodship and one of the first in Poland.

== Awards ==
He received: twice Artistic Award of Opole Voivode (in 1987 and in 1994); Mark Jodłowski's Literary Award (2000); Artistic Award of the Mayor of the City of Opole; Award of the Marshal on Opole Voivodeship – for the creation as a whole but with special regard to the Katyń subject (2006); Artistic Award "Friends of Art Association" in Trenton, New Jersey, US (2007). Moreover, he won the Prize together with prof. Julian Aleksandrowicz (posthumously) in the 28th Competition for the Creation Popularizing Science and Technology (this Prize was awarded for the book "On the Threshold of the Future Medicine" by the papers Kurier Polski and Problemy).

The winner of prizes and awards in more than 20 literary competitions, such as Opole Spring, Łodź Poetical Spring, Icarian Wing's Prize and in the contests set up by Radio Szczecin. For many years, since his student times, he carried on welfare work, mainly in the circles of literature and art, as a protector of nature, and to commemorate the Katyń Crime.

Duda's creation was a subject of four Master's and three Licentiate theses (in Częstochowa and in Słupsk) and his poetical-biblical works became the main subject of a habilitation thesis in 2015 (Małorzata Nowak: "Versified Bible Today", published by: KUL, Lublin 2015).

He was awarded: Knight Cross of the Order on Poland's Revival (I2002); Medal of the Commission of National Education (1999); Golden Medal of the Protector of the National Memory's Places (2011); Golden Medal “For the Merits of in Protection of the Environment and Natural Resources (1990); Award of Honour "Meritorious for Polish Culture" (2006); Golden Award of Honour "Meritorious for Nature Protection" – given by the League for the Preservation of Nature (1990); Commemorative "Cross of the Protection of the South-Easterly Borderland" (2010); Combatant Commemorative Cross "Victors 1945" (2010); Medal "Pro Memoriam" (2011); Award of Honour "Meritorious for Opole Voivodeship" (2010); award "meritorious for the Regional Activity".

In 2010, he received the "Karol Miarka Award", a prestigious award in Opole Silesia and in Upper Silesia.

== Bibliography ==
1. "Gropingly" (poems). In: "Pondering over Place" (poetical casket). Opole poetical sheets. Opole Literary Library vol. 13. "Śląsk", Katowice 1967.
2. "The Test of Silence" (poems). "Śląsk", Katowice 1973.
3. Apolinary Oliwa: "When the Knives Were Consecrated" (literary adaptation by Harry Duda). OTK-O, Opole 1973.
4. "The Smell of Smoke" (poems). "Śląsk", Katowice 1976.
5. "Empty Zenith" (poems). "Śląsk", Katowice 1980.
6. "The Hour of Light" (poem). Afterword by Bogusław Żurakowski. Wyd. Łódzkie, Kielce 1985.
7. Julian Aleksandrowicz, Harry Duda: "On the Threshold of the Future Medicine". Państw. Zakład Wyd. Lekarskich, Warsaw 1988, 1st edition.
8. Julian Aleksandrowicz, Harry Duda: "On the Threshold of the Future Medicine". STON, Radom 1991, 2nd edition.
9. "Notes of Illusions" (poems). Miniatura, Kraków 1990.
10. "If We Abide by Truth" (poems). "Wers", Opole 1992.
11. "Drawings of Nature" (poems). "Wers", Opole 1992.
12. Wilhelm Przeczek: "Smoke under Finger-nails" (selected poems). Edited by Harry Duda. "Wers", Opole 1992.
13. "David's Psalms Versified. Collection I (1-25)". "Wers", Opole 1991.
14. "David's Psalms Versified. Collection II (26-50)". "Wers", Opole 1992.
15. "David's Psalms Versified. Collection III (51-75)". Published by: "Wers", Opole 1994.
16. "David's Psalms Versified. Collection IV (76-100)". "Wers", Opole 1994
17. "David's Psalms Versified. Collection V (101-125)". "Wers", Opole 1995.
18. "David's Psalms Versified. Collection VI (126-150)". Author-publisher. "Wers", Opole 1996.
19. "Following the Routes of Crime: Ostashkov, Twer, Miedonje" (Literary report, nonfiction). Published by: Opolskie Koło Dolnośląskiej Rodziny Katyńskiej we Wrocławiu and MW, Opole 1994.
20. "Dictationmachy or the Colonel's History Written in Heroic-comical Way with Elocution, Spelling and Rhymes (poetical burlesque)". Bibliophilic edition 40 copies, Opole 1996.
21. "The Abyss of Needle's Eye" (poems). "wers", Opole 1997.
22. "Following the Route of Crime II. Opole Inhabitants in Katyń Cause" (literary report, nonfiction, essay). Introduction: Prelate zdzisław J. Peszkowski. Edited by Tadeusz Podkówka, Opole 1998.
23. "Jesus Christ. Poetical Vision of Four Gospels". Foreword: bishop Adam Dyczkowski. Preface: prof. Zbyszko Bednorz. Afterword: doctor Zdzisław Kempf. 1st edition. Author-publisher. Bibliophilic edition, Opole 1999.
24. "Jesus Christ. Poetical Vision of Four Gospels". Foreword: bishop Adam Dyczkowski. Preface: professor Zbyszko Bednorz. Afterword: professor Zdzisław Kempf. Published by: Wydawnictwo Cywilizacji Miłości, Opole 2012, 2nd edition ("With permission of Church Authority on the 29 of August 2012, No 876/12/I").
25. "With Pen around America" (poems). Bibliophilic edition 150 copies. Published by: Ryszard Druch Art Studio, Trenton, NJ, US 2000.
26. "Patience at the Cross-roads" (poems). "Wers" Opole 2000.
27. "Against Violence". Selected poems compiled by Harry Duda. Published by: The Central Museum of the Prisoners of War in Opole and Łambinowice, Opole 2001.
28. "Practical Publishing Instructions". Published by: WOM, Opole 2001.
29. "The Book of Job Versified". STON 2, Kielce 2001.
30. "Shir Hashirim or Salomon's Song of Songs Versified". Published by: Wojewódzka Biblioteka Publiczna w Opolu, Opole 2004.
31. Tadeusz Soroczyński: "Selected Poems". Selected and edited by Harry Duda. Woj. Bibl. Publ., Opole 2005.
32. "Threnodes to Mother" (poems). Afterword: Stanisław Nyczaj. Woj. Bibl. Publ., Opole 2006.
33. "Jeremiah's Threnodes or Complaints, Grievances and Lamentations Versified". Oficyna Wydawnicza LEKSEM, Łask-Łódź 2008.
34. "American Poems". Published by: Friends of Art Association, Trenton, NJ and by Woj. Bibl. Publ. w Opolu, Opole 2010.
35. "Without Correctness" (poems). Opole 2009.
36. "Chopped off the Trunk" (Katyń poems). Woj. Bibl. Publ., Opole 2010.
37. "My Previous Worlds" (poems). Oficyna Konfraterni Poetów (Confraternity of Poets); Jubilee Series for the 25th Anniversary of the Confraternity of Poets, Kraków 2010.
38. "St. John's Apocalypse Versified". Oficyna Konfraterni Poetów - 1986, Kraków 2012.
39. "The Dead Cast Shadows" (poems). Ofic. Konfr. Poetów – 1986, Kraków 2012.
40. "The Book of Ecclesiastes Versified". Woj,. Bibl. Publ., Opole 2014.
41. "Non-return Capsule" (poems). Woj. Bibl. Publ., Opole 2014.
42. "The Barking of Last Dog" (poems). Woj. Bibl. Publ., Opole 2015.
