= Peterhof landing stage =

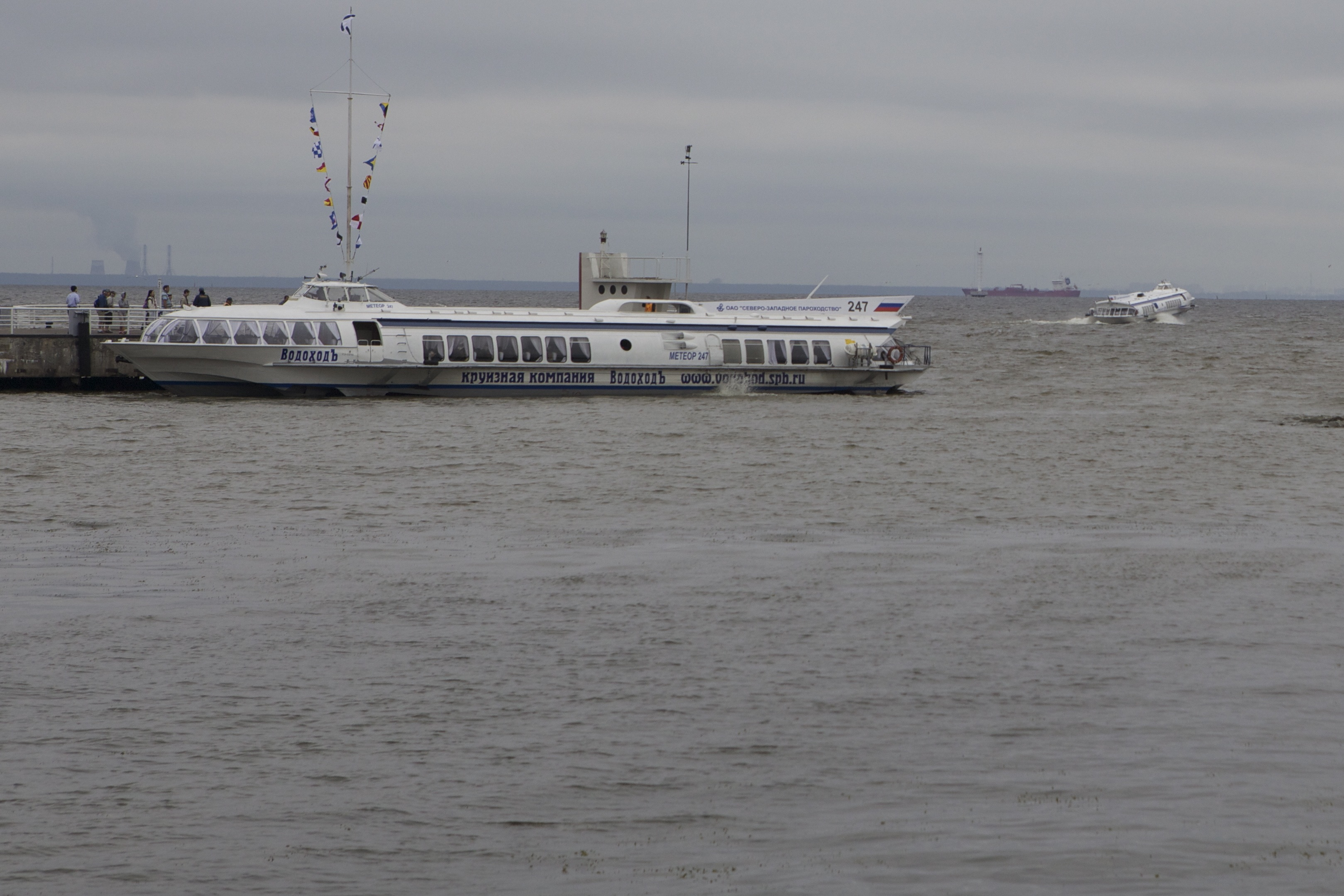
- Type: Hydrofoil boats lines Pier
- Carries: Pedestrian
- Spans: Gulf of Finland
- Location: Petergof, suburb of St. Petersburg
- Coordinates: 59°53′26″N 29°54′47″E
- Official name: Passenger mooring Peterhof; Russian: Пассажирский причал Петергоф
- Owner: Peterhof Palace museum

Characteristics
- Construction: Pile structure
- Total length: 136.5 m (448 ft)
- Width: 8 m (26 ft)

History

Peterhof landing stage is a mooring for hydrofoil boats, of the type Meteor, in the Lower Gardens of Peterhof Palace. It is located in northern end of the Samsonovsky Canal (Sea Canal). The exit from it is directed away of St. Petersburg.

The mooring and foot platform are located at the open coast of Gulf of Finland. It has a length of 136.5 metres (448 ft), width of 8 metres (26 ft).

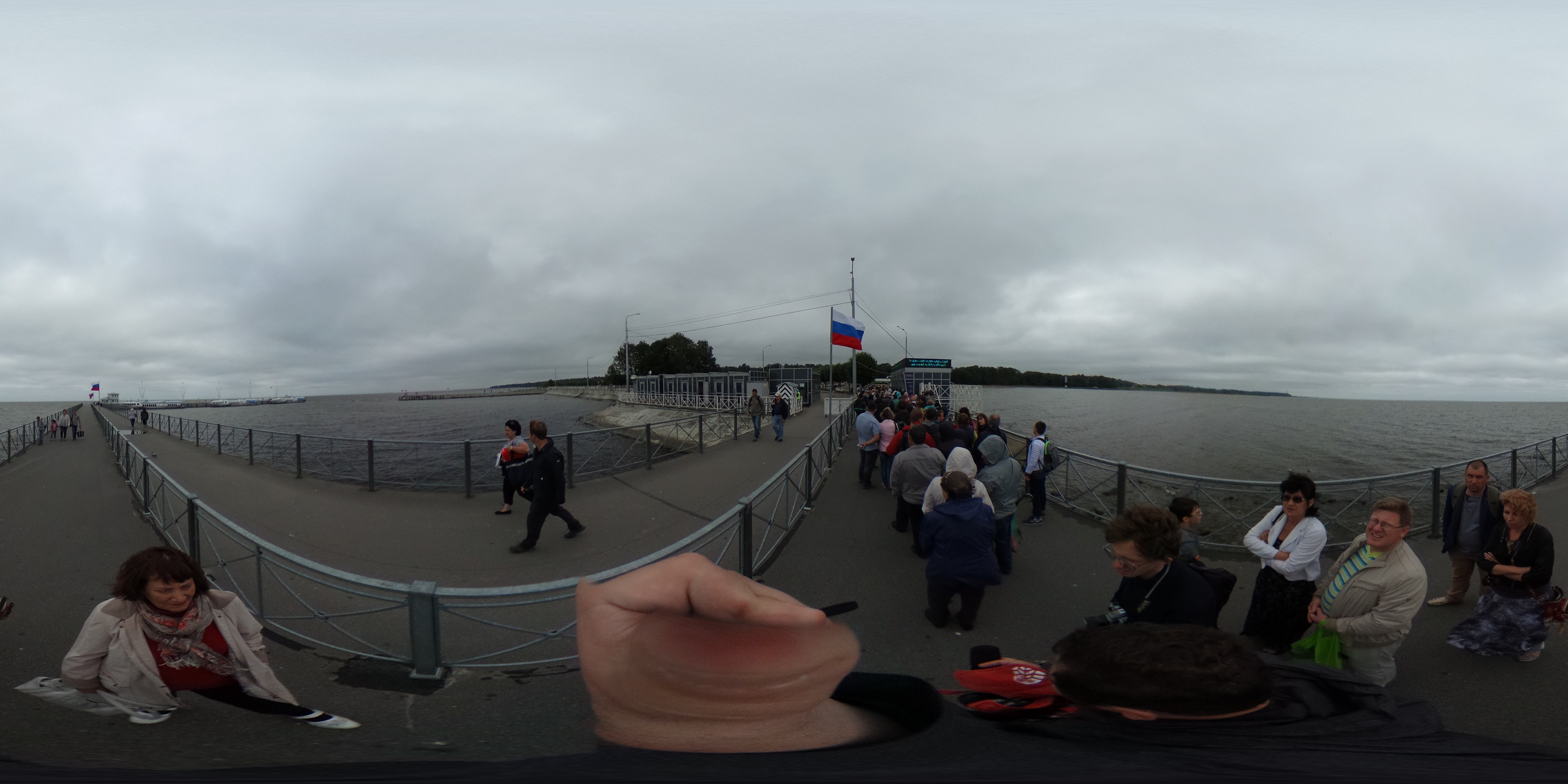
Peterhof pier at cloudy day after arriving of hydrofoil (view as a 360° interactive panorama)
