= Farm Palace =

Coordinates: 59.8791°N 29.9336°E

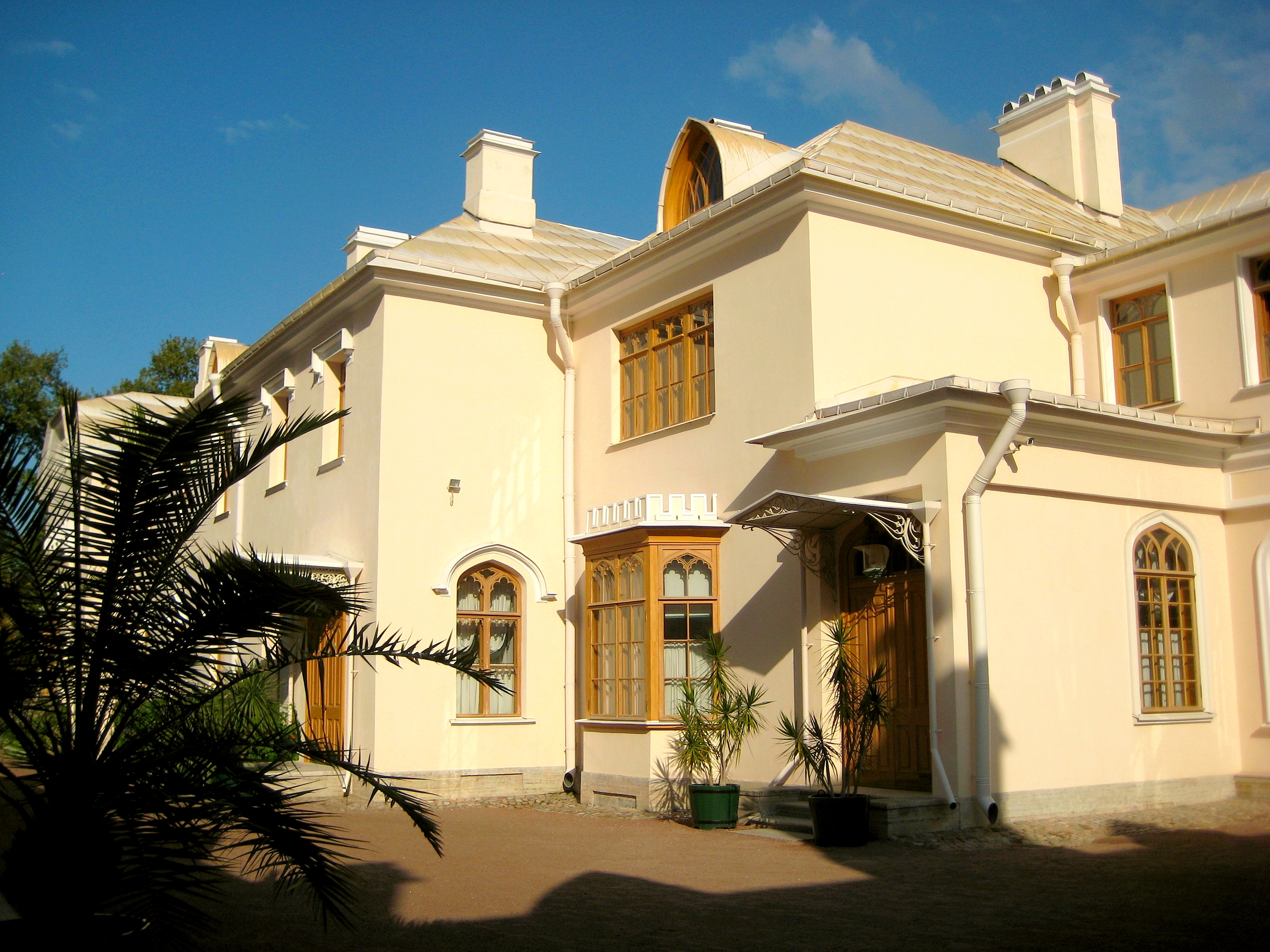
The house in 2018

The Farm Palace (Russian: Фермерский дворец) is a pavilion in the Alexandria Park of Peterhof, close to the Cottage Palace and Gothic Chapel. It was later expanded into a summer residence for the family of Tsesarevich Alexander Nikolaevich of Russia. The house has been open to visitors since 2010.

The original pavilion was built in 1828–1831 to designs by Adam Menelaws. It was scored to resemble a pastoral farm with a row of household buildings. In 1838–1839 architect Andrei Stackenschneider added a two-story house with habitable rooms for the tsesarevich. The palace became the favorite summer residence of Alexander II and his family. After many reconstructions, the house was named "The Farm Palace" in 1859.

After the death of Alexander II, his son Tsar Alexander III chose to remain at the Cottage Palace, whereas his son Tsar Nicholas II and his family lived in the New Palace.

The two-story, fifty-five roomed palace included the tsar's study and sitting room, the imperial bedroom and bathroom, the sitting room and dressing room of the Empress Maria Alexandrovna of Russia, the Blue and Floral Drawing Rooms, the bedrooms of the imperial children, and the dining room. The palace grounds had a formal garden with several statues, a well and a fountain, and a white marble outdoor tub and a wood and rock bridge that was over a creek.

Empress Alexandra Feodorovna of Russia, the wife of Nicholas II, and her sister-in-law Grand Duchess Xenia Alexandrovna of Russia, the eldest daughter of Alexander III, gave birth at the palace to her daughters Grand Duchess Tatiana Nikolaevna of Russia on June 10, 1897, and Princess Irina Alexandrovna of Russia on July 15, 1895.
