= Adam Menelaws =

Scottish architect (1748/1756–1831)

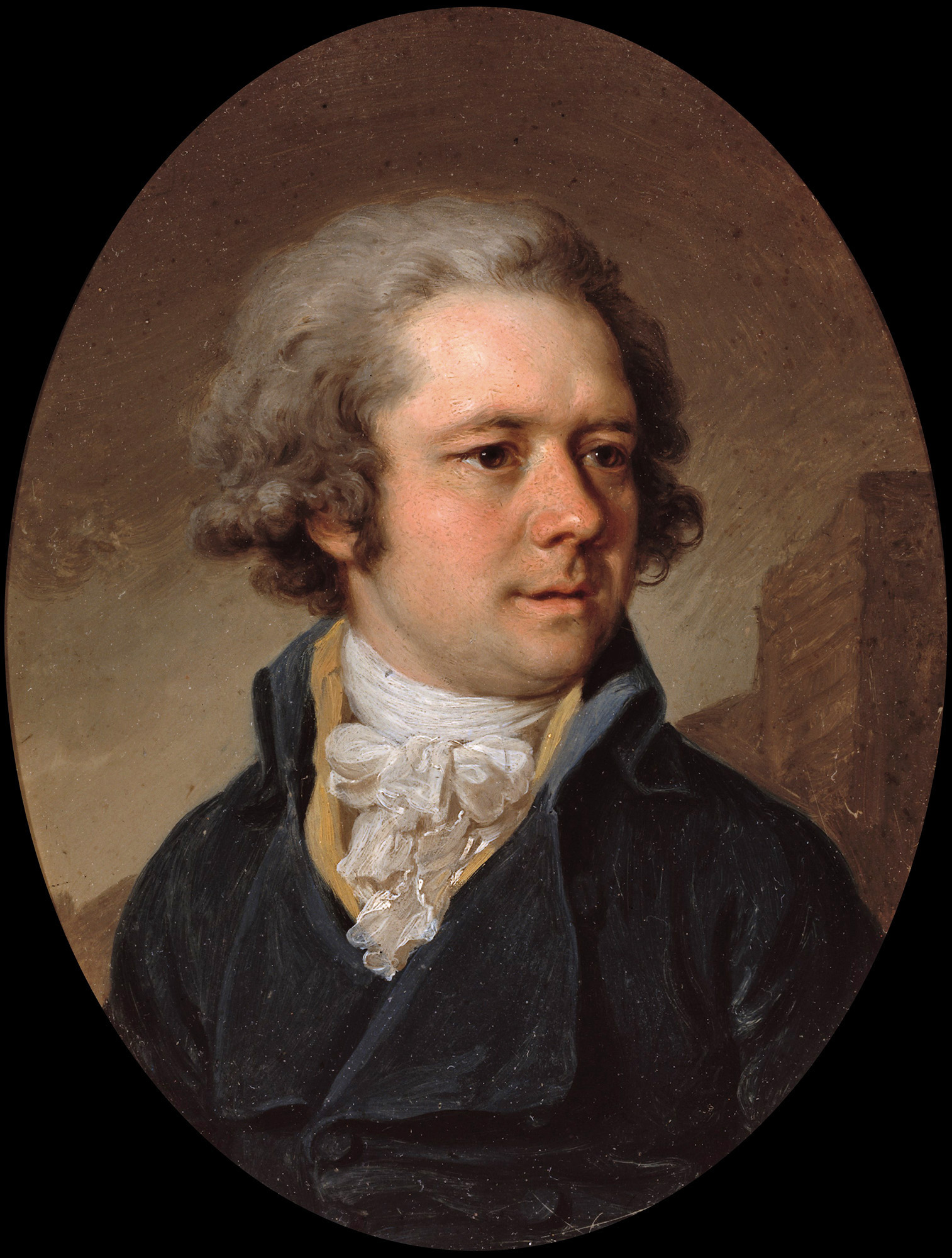
- Portrait by Vladimir Borovikovsky, 1790s
- Born: 1748–1756 presumably Edinburgh, Scotland
- Died: 31 August 1831 (aged 74–83); Saint Petersburg, Russia
- Occupation: Architect
- Projects: Alexandria Park, Petergof

Adam Menelaws (also spelled Menelas; Russian: Адам Адамович Менелас, romanized: Adam Adamovich Menelas; between 1748 and 1756 – 31 August 1831) was an architect and landscape designer of Scottish origin, active in the Russian Empire from 1784 to 1831. Menelaws achieved success in the first two decades of the 19th century as the designer of town and country residences and parks of Razumovsky and Stroganov families, and later worked for emperor Alexander I, specializing in Gothic Revival architecture. From 1825 to 1831, Menelaws, then in his seventies, became the first house architect of Nicholas I and the de facto leading architect in Russia. Except for this final, properly evidenced, stage, life story of Adam Menelaws remains scarcely documented and has been reconstructed by biographers based on sketchy archive data and circumstantial evidence; Menelaws still "belongs to the category of almost unknown".

== Biography ==
The Scottish origin of Menelaws was confirmed by the architect himself to A. B. Granville, an English traveler who published a report of his journey in London in 1828. There is no other reliable evidence of his early years, education and experience prior to arriving in Russia in 1784. Members of Menelaws family were construction contractors in Argyll; Howard Colvin and Dmitry Shvidkovsky suggest that Adam Menelaws belonged to the same family, but this opinion has not been reliably confirmed by archive research. Historians split over the year of his birth: a 1784 immigration record suggests that he arrived in Russia at the age of 35, i.e. born in or around 1748, while the funeral records of the English church in Saint Petersburg state the year of his birth as 1756. In 1803 Menelaws asserted that he hails from a noble English family, but Russian authorities refused to honour his claim.

In early 1780s Charles Cameron, an architect employed by Catherine II since 1779, published a job offer in Edinburgh Evening News, signed Catherine of Russia, inviting skilled construction workers to join his Tsarskoye Selo project. 73 craftsmen, including Adam Menelaws, agreed to move to Russia (many took their families with them), causing a futile protest of the Foreign Office. All were sufficiently qualified to become professional architects or at least architect's trainees in Russia; Cameron ranked Menelaws as the one of two best stonemasons – the "vaulting master". Menelaws signed for a three-year contract to build the Cold Baths near Saint Petersburg, agreeing also to train a class of Russian craftsmen. Apparently the number of Scottish professionals was too big for Cameron, and one year later Menelaws left him and joined the service of Nikolay Lvov.

Lvov, an amateur composer, poet and Palladian architect was at that time aide to statesman Alexander Bezborodko. Historians divide over his role in Menelaws career: tradition held it that Lvov promoted Menelaws, introducing him to the Crown projects, while later researchers assert that, on the contrary, Lvov's influence slowed down Menelaws career. Instead of architecture, in May 1785 Lvov engaged Menelaws and William Heste in search for coal fossils (at that time Russian metallurgy was dependent on either charcoal or imports from England and Wales). In 1786 Menelaws found commercial-grade ("not inferior to that of Newcastle") coal near Borovichi; by 1790 the coal research team increased to 10 professionals. It is quite likely, however, that Lvov used the state-sponsored quest for coal as a cover to extract a talented architect for his own use: in 1785–1794 Menelaws was regularly involved in Lvov's construction projects. Another Scot, Walter Irving, was employed by Lvov to construct his idealist Sun Temple, a country estate in Tver Oblast; its circular arcade, resembling the henges of Britain, was later recreated in Menelaws' own designs. The rotunda motive, common to Menelaws later works, was most likely inspired by Lvov.

Menelaws married Elizabeth Cave in 1792; the ceremony was attended by Lvov, Alexey Olenin (president of the Imperial Academy of Arts) and numerous members of the English and Scottish diaspora. In 1795 Menelaws began gradually separating from Lvov's service after the construction of the Saint Joseph cathedral in Mahilyow, but the two remained in contact until Lvov's sudden death in 1803. Meanwhile, Menelaws remained a Russian state servant of a small rank since his arrival. After Lvov's death he attempted to retire immediately, but, faced with refusal in pension benefits, preferred to remain in service until 1806. According to Anthony Cross, "the late burgeoning of Menelaws talent" probably occurred only after Lvov' death, during his work for the Razumovsky family.

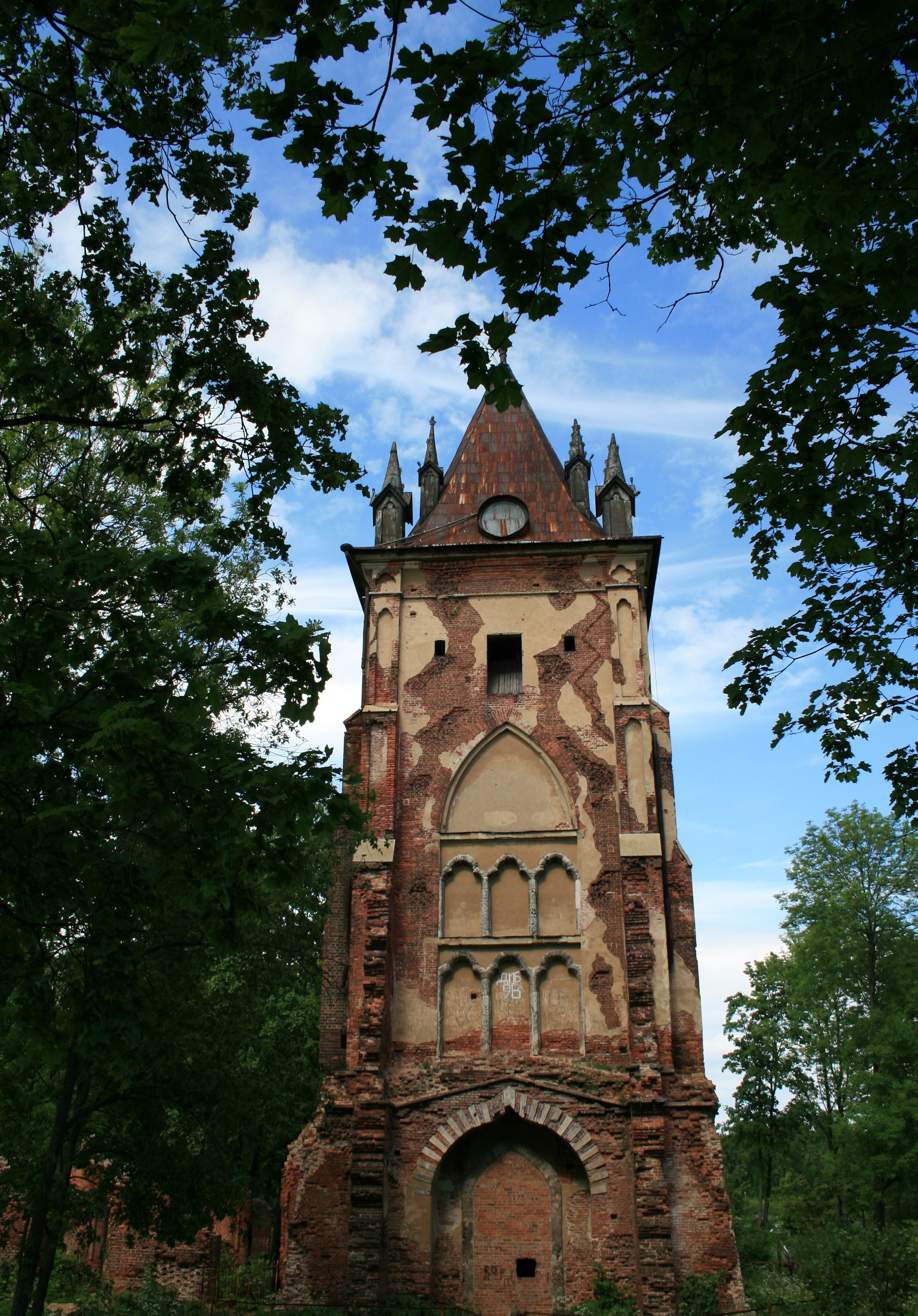
The Chapel in Tsarskoye Selo provided living quarters to the chaplain of Nicholas I

In the 19th century Menelaws created a string of English gardens for the Razumovskys; the best known, in Gorenki (present-day Balashikha), was included in John Claudius Loudon's An Encyclopedia of Gardening for its landscaping and a private botanical garden. Historians split on the issue whether Gorenki was designed primarily by Menelaws or by Lvov. In 1801–1802 Menelaws designed and built the Razumovsky Palace in Basmanny District of Moscow; the palace was destroyed by the Fire of 1812 and later reconstructed by Afanasy Grigoriev. Another large park, Stroganov's Maryino Estate, was laid down near Saint Peterburg in 1813. All these landscaping projects perished by the end of 19th century. Menelaws park designs always employed a Gothic ruin as a visual anchor. Menelaws was instrumental in operations of the Maryino school established by the Golitsyns in 1819, teaching the peasants the craft of cob construction. Introduction of cob technology in Russia is usually credited to Lvov, but may also be linked directly to Menelaws's Scottish experience. Dmitry Shvidkovsky suggested that Menelaws, not Cameron, was the designer of the Razumovsky palace in Baturin, but other historians reject this opinion.

In the 1810s Alexander I invited Menelaws to redesign the Alexander's Park in Tsarskoye Selo, starting with an old dilapidated menagerie. The new plan proposed by Menelaws created an illusion of a completely novel design, yet carefully preserved the structure of a regular park shaped in the previous century; according to Lvov, Menelaws "merged the art of Kent and Le Nôtre". Menelaws designed and built 12 structures, including the Egyptian Gates and three park pavilions: the large Arsenal (1819–1834) built on the site of Mon Bijou built by Francesco Bartolomeo Rastrelli in 1750s, the White Tower (1821–1827), a house for the young Grand Dukes and the Chapel (1825–1828), a folly providing living quarter to the palace chaplain. Use of an eclectic, pan-European romanticism was justified as a symbol of the New Europe shaped at the Congress of Vienna, but was also a sign of Alexander's turn to mysticism. Alexander's Park was occupied by Nicholas I, then heir presumptive, who also leaned to eclecticism and medieval legacy, as would be evidenced later by his reign.

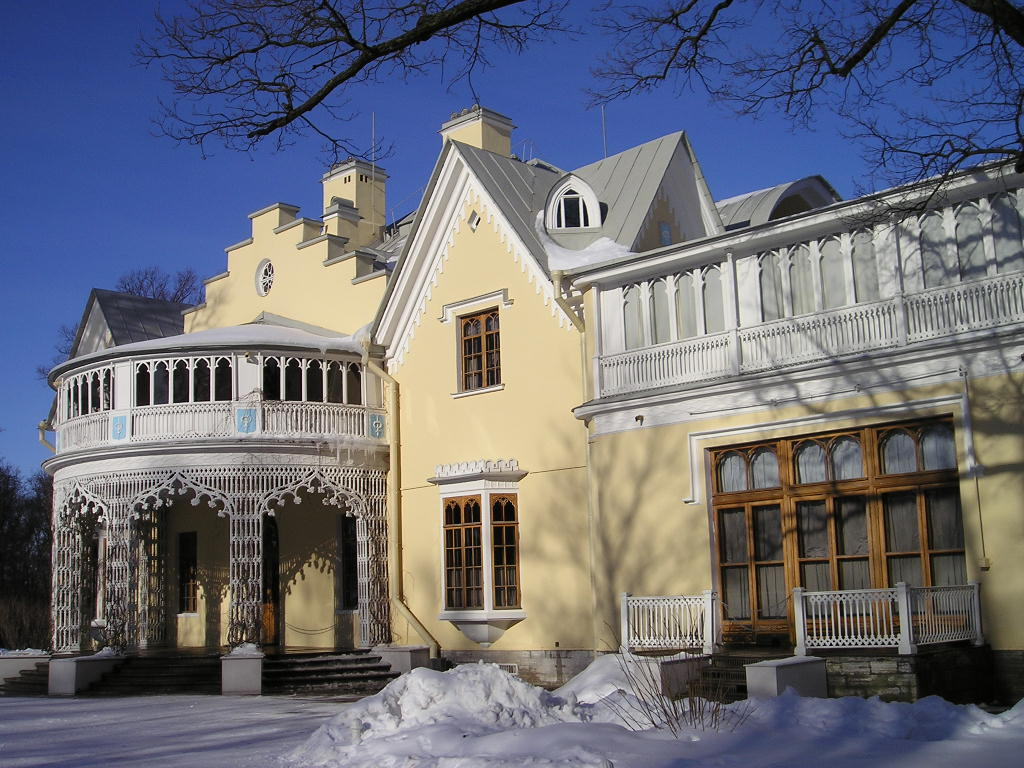
The Cottage in Alexandria Park, Petergof.

Nicholas became Menelaws' "most appreciative patron who provided him with the opportunity at a very advanced stage of life". Indeed, his most important commission, the Alexandria Park, was started when the architect was at least around 70 years old.

Shortly before his death in 1824, Alexander I granted a 285-acre (1.15 km^{2}) lot of land on the coast of Gulf of Finland, east of Petergof, to Nicholas I. The new Alexandria Park, commissioned to Menelaws, became the last, and best preserved of the architect's projects. The work started with landscaping the territory and digging two large artificial pools; after Alexander's death, Nicholas commissioned Menelaws to build his summer residence, the asymmetrical Cottage. Externally, it was more English than Gothic; Gothic influence was more obvious in the interiors designed by Menelaws. The park, laid down in English style, featured winding walkways around ponds, and had a Gothic Chapel (private church of the House of Romanov, designed by Karl Friedrich Schinkel) as its focal point (it was completed by Ludwig Charlemagne three years after Menelaws' death). It was suggested that Nicholas actually planned to relocate the remains of Alexander Nevsky into the chapel. The park also had facilities of the lesser rank: an animal sanctuary for old horses retired from the palace service, a farm and a menagerie with llama and elephant pavilions. Elephants lived in Alexandria until 1911 and were allowed to roam free in the summer.

Menelaws died in Saint Petersburg during the cholera epidemic of 1831.
