= Peterhof Palace =

Series of palaces and gardens located in Petergof, Saint Petersburg, Russia

UNESCO World Heritage Site
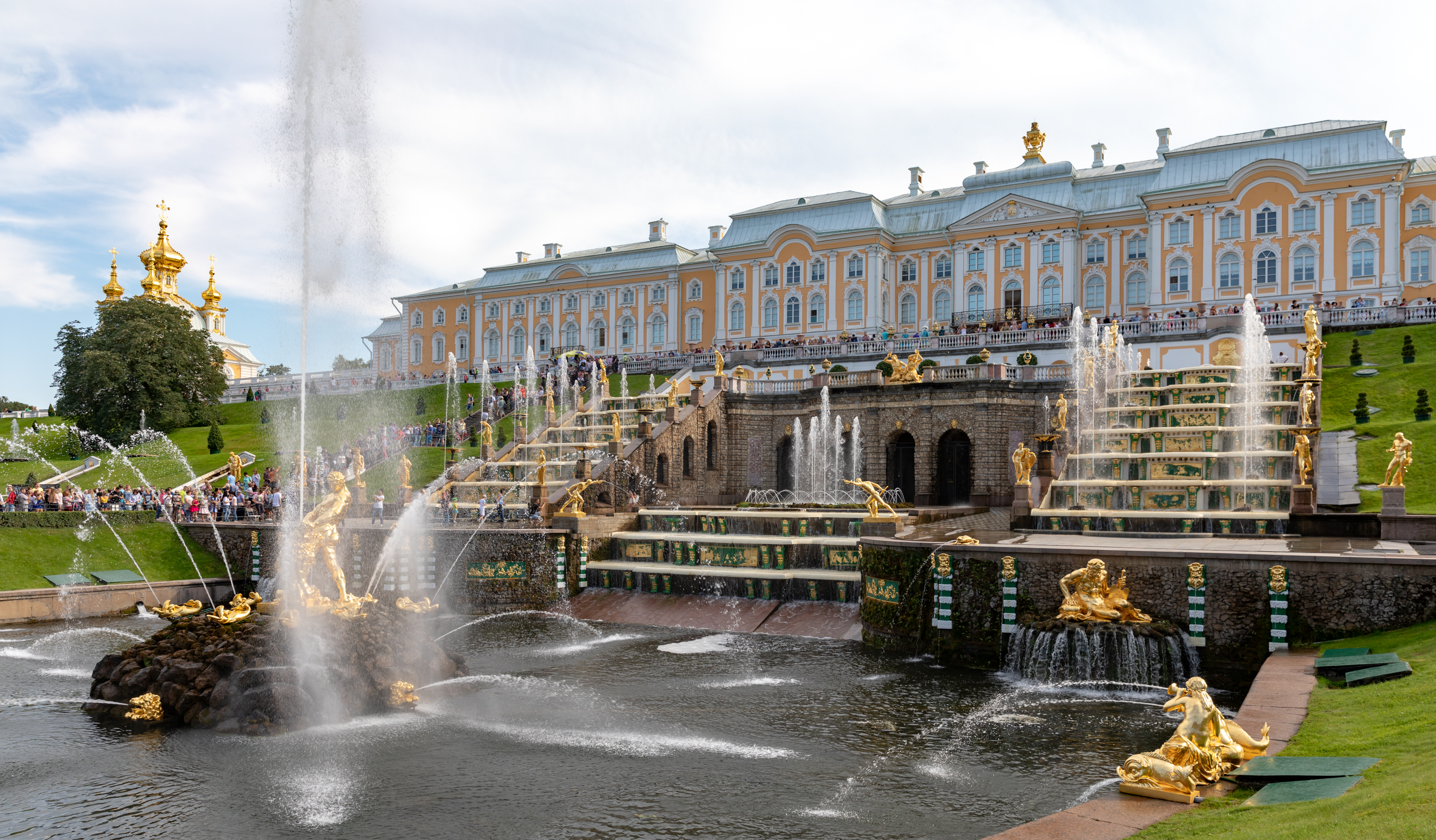
- Interactive map of Peterhof Palace
- Official name: Historic Centre of Saint Petersburg and Related Groups of Monuments
- Criteria: Cultural: (i)(ii)(iv)(vi)
- Reference: 540bis
- Inscription: 1990 (14th Session)
- Area: 3,934.1 ha (9,721 acres)
- Coordinates: 59°53′04″N 29°54′32″E

The Peterhof Palace (Russian: Петерго́ф, romanized: Petergóf, IPA: [pʲɪtʲɪrˈɡof]; an emulation of German "Peterhof", meaning "Peter's Court") is a series of palaces and gardens located in Petergof, Saint Petersburg, Russia, commissioned by Peter the Great as a direct response to the Palace of Versailles by Louis XIV of France. Originally intending it in 1709 for country habitation, Peter the Great sought to expand the property as a result of his visit to the French royal court in 1717, inspiring the nickname of "The Russian Versailles". The architect between 1714 and 1728 was Domenico Trezzini, and the style he employed became the foundation for the Petrine Baroque style favored throughout Saint Petersburg. Also in 1714, Jean-Baptiste Alexandre Le Blond, likely chosen due to his previous collaborations with Versailles landscaper André Le Nôtre, designed the gardens. Francesco Bartolomeo Rastrelli completed an expansion from 1747 to 1756 for Elizabeth of Russia. The palace-ensemble along with the city center is recognized as a UNESCO World Heritage Site.

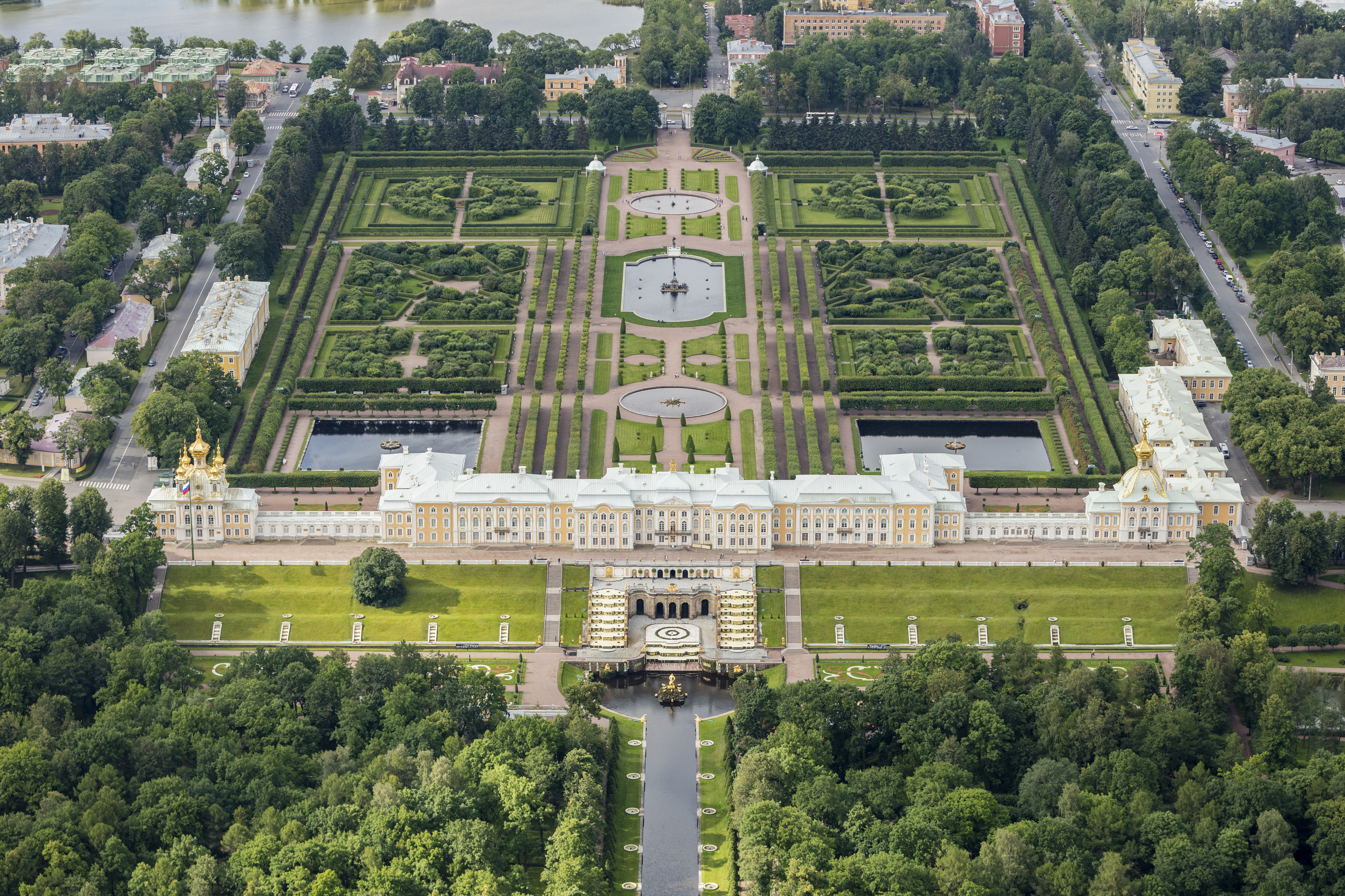
Aerial view of Peterhof Palace (main building) and the upper garden

== Construction ==
The end of the Great Northern War resulted in the Treaty of Nystad in 1721, ceding much of the Swedish Empire's claim to the Baltic Sea to the rising Tsardom of Russia. Peter the Great already began construction of his new capital St Petersburg in 1703 after successfully capturing Swedish provinces on the eastern coast. This strategic location allowed Russian access to the Baltic Sea through the Neva River that flowed to the Gulf of Finland. The island of Kotlin and its fortress Kronstadt west of St Petersburg provided a gateway and commercial harbor access owing to the shallowness of water closer to the city.

Throughout the early 18th century, Peter the Great built and expanded the Peterhof Palace complex as a part of his goal to modernize and westernize Russia.

=== Monplaisir Palace (1714–1723) ===
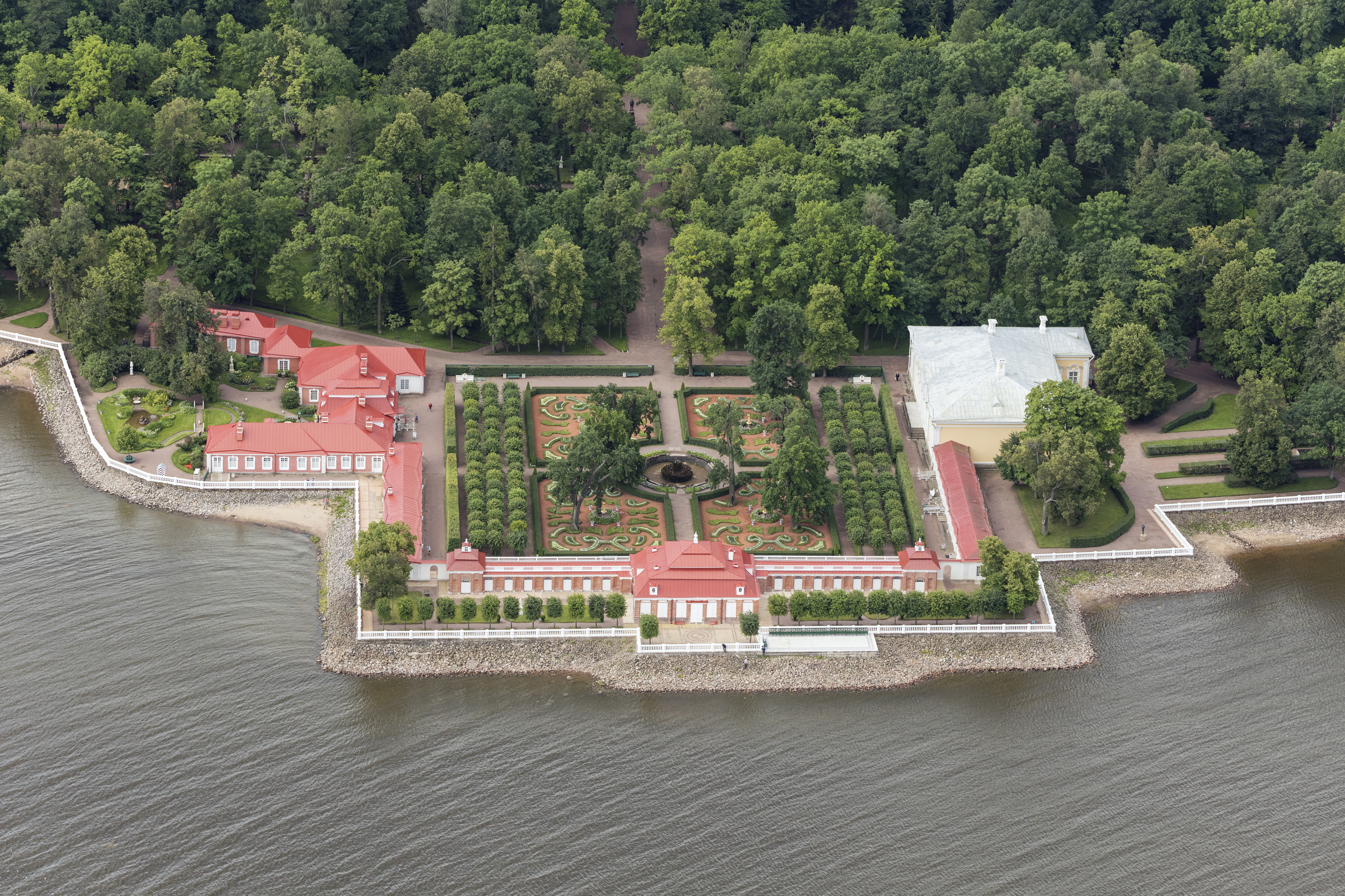
Aerial view of Monplaisir Palace and gardens

In 1714, Peter began construction of the Monplaisir Palace based on his own sketches. He "chalked out not only the site but also the inside layout, some elements of the decorative finish, etc". Later, he expanded his plans to include a vaster royal château of palaces and gardens further inland, on the model of Versailles which would become Peterhof Palace. The initial design of the palace and its garden was done by the French architect Jean-Baptiste Le Blond.

== Layout ==
The dominant natural feature of Peterhof is a 16-m-high bluff lying less than 100 m from the shore. The so-called Lower Gardens (Nizhny Sad), at 1.02 km^{2} comprising the better part of Peterhof's land area, are confined between this bluff and the shore, stretching east and west for roughly 200 m. The majority of Peterhof's fountains are contained here, as are several small palaces and outbuildings. East of the Lower Gardens lies the Alexandria Park with 19th-century Gothic Revival structures such as the Kapella.

Atop the bluff, near the middle of the Lower Gardens, stands the Grand Palace (Bolshoi Dvorets). Behind (south) of it are the comparatively small Upper Gardens (Verhnyy Sad). Upon the bluff's face below the palace is the Grand Cascade (Bolshoi Kaskad). This and the Grand Palace are the centrepiece of the entire complex. At its foot begins the Sea Channel (Morskoi Kanal), one of the most extensive waterworks of the Baroque period, which bisects the Lower Gardens.

=== The Grand Cascade and Samson Fountain ===
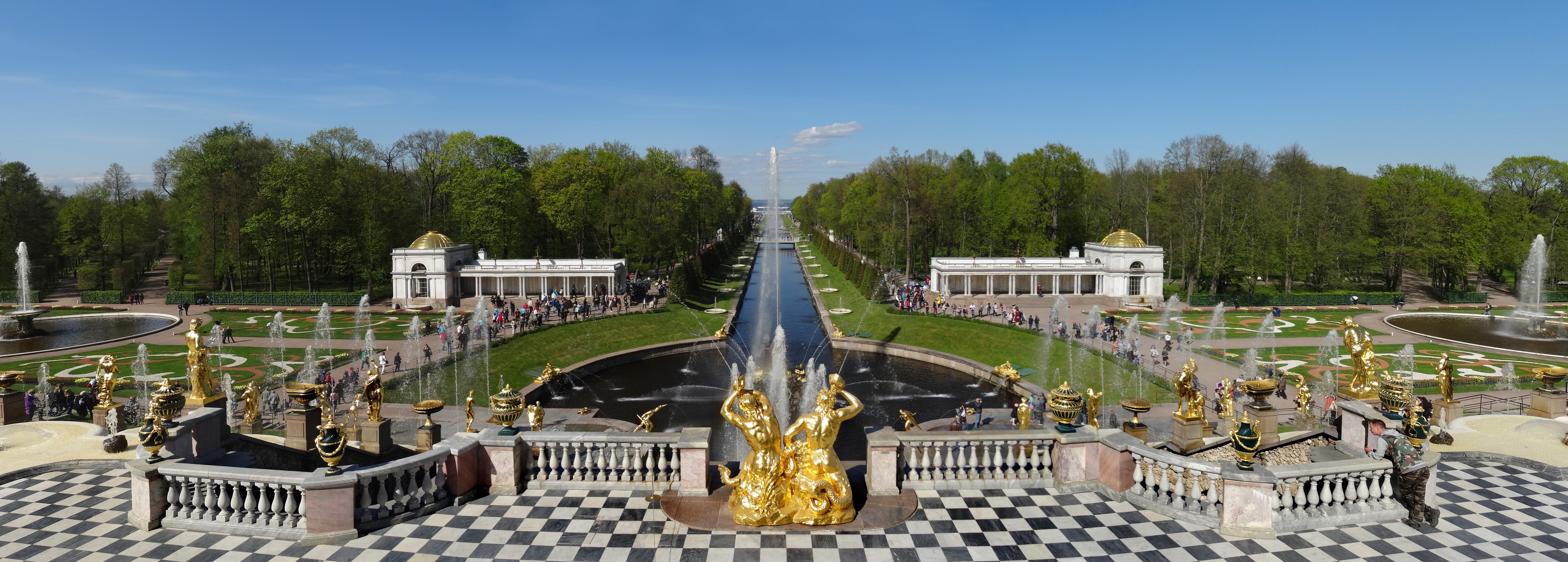
Peterhof: the Samson Fountain and Sea Channel

The Grand Cascade is modelled on one constructed for Louis XIV at his Château de Marly, which is likewise memorialised in one of the park's outbuildings.

At the centre of the cascade is an artificial grotto with two stories, faced inside and out with hewn brown stone. It currently contains a modest museum of the fountains' history.

The fountains of the Grand Cascade are located below the grotto and on either side of it. There are 64 fountains. Their waters flow into a semicircular pool, the terminus of the fountain-lined Sea Channel. In the 1730s, the large Samson Fountain was placed in this pool. It depicts the moment when Samson tears open the jaws of a lion, representing Russia's victory over Sweden in the Great Northern War, and is doubly symbolic. The lion is an element of the Swedish coat of arms, and one of the great victories of the war was won on St Sampson's Day. From the lion's mouth shoots a 20-metre (66 ft)-high vertical jet of water, the highest in all of Peterhof. This masterpiece by Mikhail Kozlovsky was looted by the invading Germans during the Second World War; see History below. A replica of the statue was installed in 1947.

Perhaps the greatest technological achievement of Peterhof is that all of the fountains operate without the use of pumps. Water is supplied from natural springs and collects in reservoirs in the Upper Gardens. The elevation difference creates the pressure that drives most of the fountains of the Lower Gardens, including the Grand Cascade.

=== The Lower Gardens ===
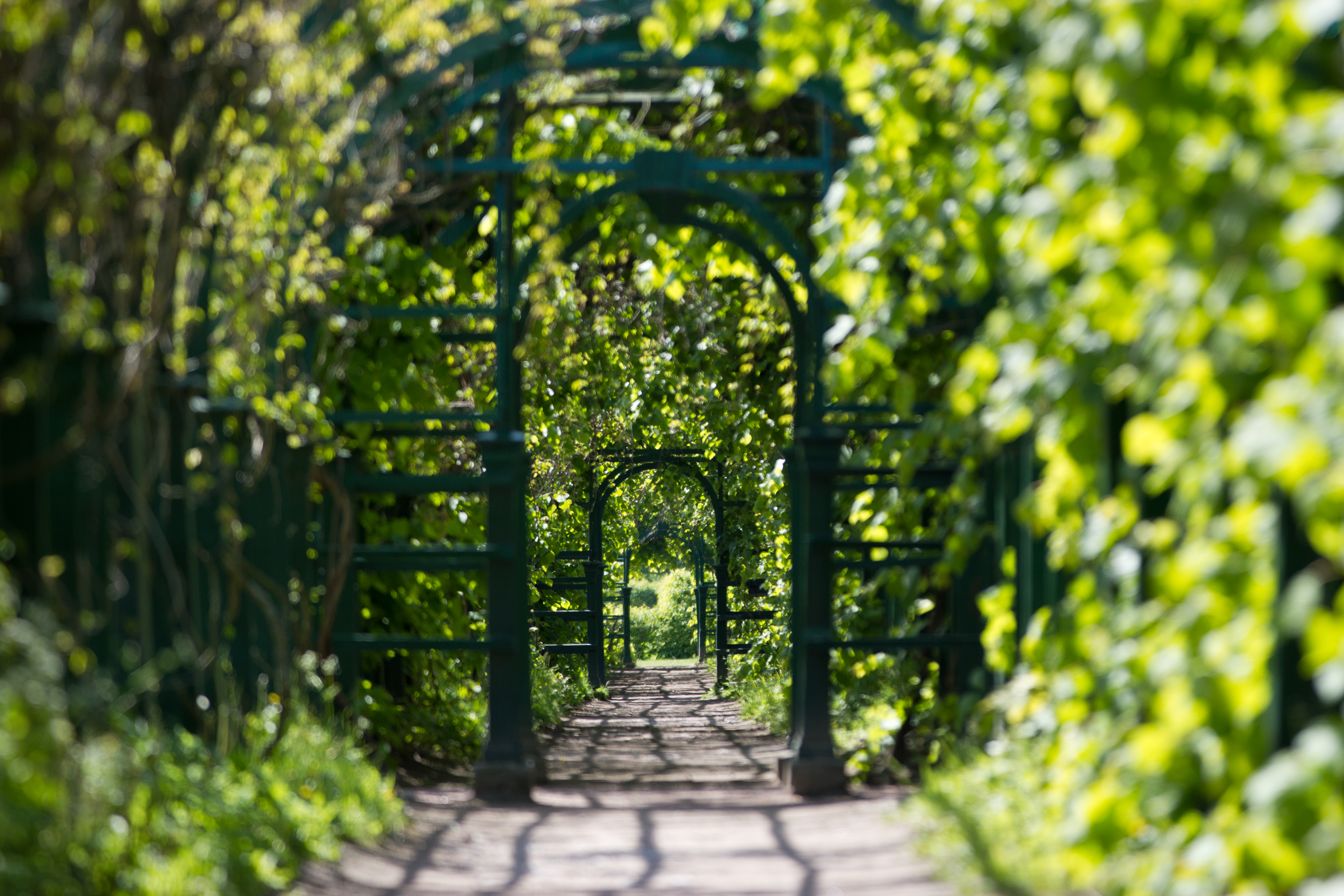
A garden area.

The expanse of the Lower Gardens is designed in the formal style of French formal gardens of the 17th century. Although many trees are overgrown, in recent years the formal clipping along the many allees has resumed in order to restore the original appearance of the garden. The many fountains located here exhibit an unusual degree of creativity.

The same bluff that provides a setting for the Grand Cascade houses two other, very different cascades. West of the Grand Palace is the Golden Mountain (Золотая Гора), decorated with marble statuary that contrasts with the riotous gilded figures of the Grand Cascade. To the east is the Chess Mountain (Шахматная Гора), a broad chute whose surface is tiled black and white like a chessboard. The most prominently positioned fountains of Peterhof are 'Adam' and 'Eve'.

=== The Grand Palace ===
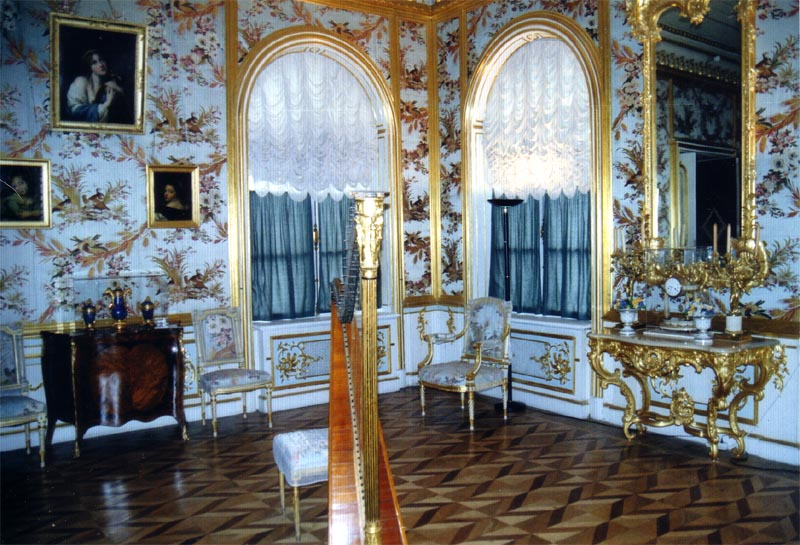
French style interior

The largest of Peterhof's palaces looks imposing when seen from the Lower or Upper Gardens, but in fact it is quite narrow and not overly large.

The Chesma Hall is decorated with twelve large paintings of the Battle of Chesma, a stunning naval victory of the Russo-Turkish War, 1768-1774. These were painted between 1771 and 1773 by the German artist Jacob Philipp Hackert. His first renderings of the great battle scenes were criticised by witnesses as not showing realistically the effect of exploding ships — the flying timbers, great flames, smoke, and fireballs.

The East and West Chinese Cabinets were decorated between 1766 and 1769 to exhibit objects of decorative art imported from the East. The walls were decorated with imitation Oriental patterns by Russian craftsmen, and hung with Chinese landscape paintings in yellow and black lacquer. Another room, positioned at the centre of the palace, bears the name of the Picture Hall.

=== Other features ===
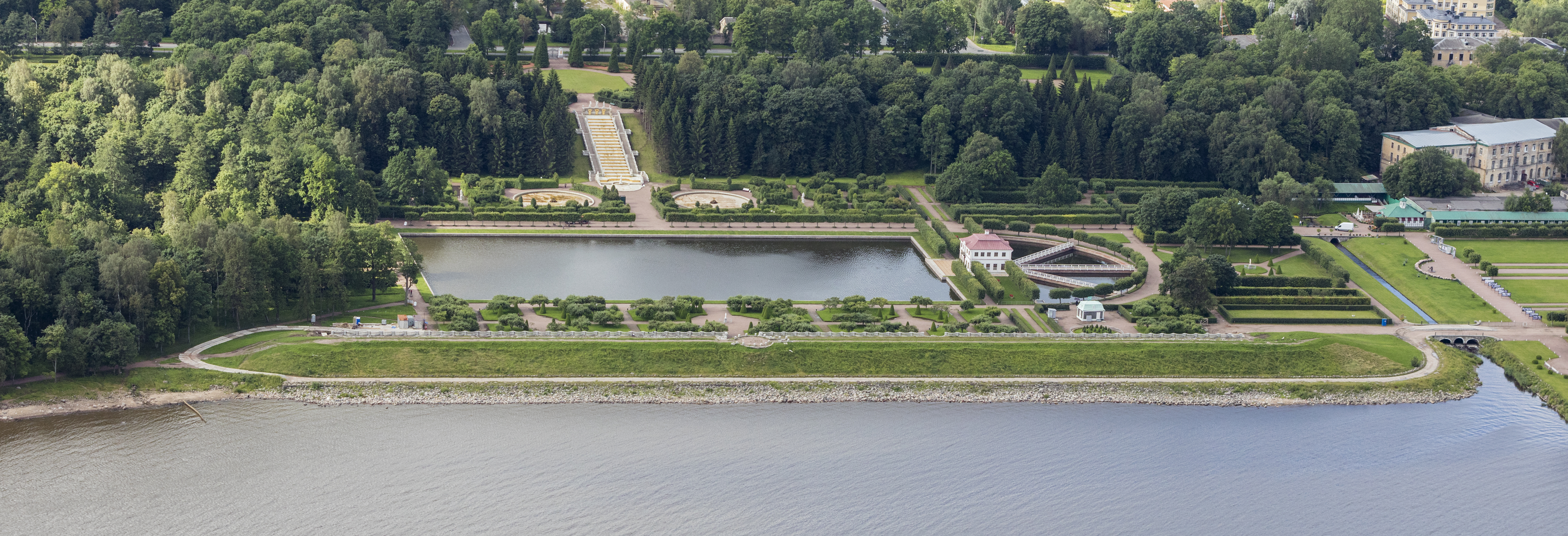
Marli Palace in the lower garden area

The Grand Palace is not the only historic royal building in Peterhof. The palaces of Monplaisir and Marli, as well as the pavilion known as the 'Hermitage', were all raised during the initial construction of Peterhof during the reign of Peter the Great.

== History ==
=== 1705–1755 ===
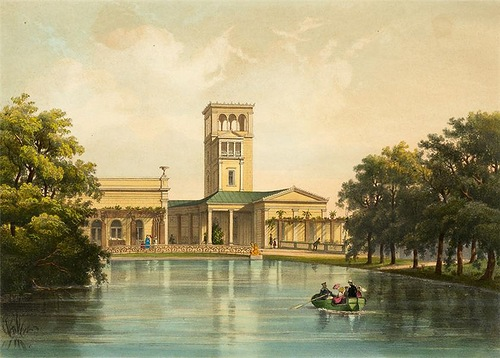
The Ozerki Pavilion (1840s), by Yegor Meyer

In the early 1700s, the original Peterhof appeared quite different from today. Many of the fountains had not yet been installed and the entire Alexandrine Park and Upper Gardens did not exist. What is now the Upper Gardens was used to grow vegetables, and its ponds, then numbering only three, for fish. The Samson Fountain and its massive pedestal had not yet been installed in the Sea Channel, and the channel itself was used as a grand marine entrance into the complex.

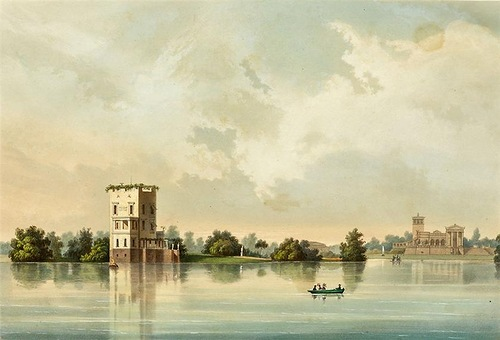
Olgin Pond (1840s), by Yegor Meyer

Perhaps the most important change augmenting Peter's design was the elevation of the Grand Palace to central status and prominence. The Grand Palace was originally called simply 'Upper', and was hardly larger than any of the other structures of the complex. The addition of wings, undertaken between 1745 and 1755, was one of the many projects commissioned from the Italian architect Bartolomeo Rastrelli by Elizabeth of Russia. Likewise, the Grand Cascade was more sparsely decorated when initially built.

=== 1941–modern day ===
Peterhof, like Tsarskoye Selo, was captured by German troops in 1941 and held until 1944. In the few months that elapsed between the German invasion of the Soviet Union and the appearance of the German Army, employees were only able to save a portion of the treasures of the palaces and fountains. An attempt was made to dismantle and bury the fountain sculptures, but three quarters, including all of the largest ones, remained in place.

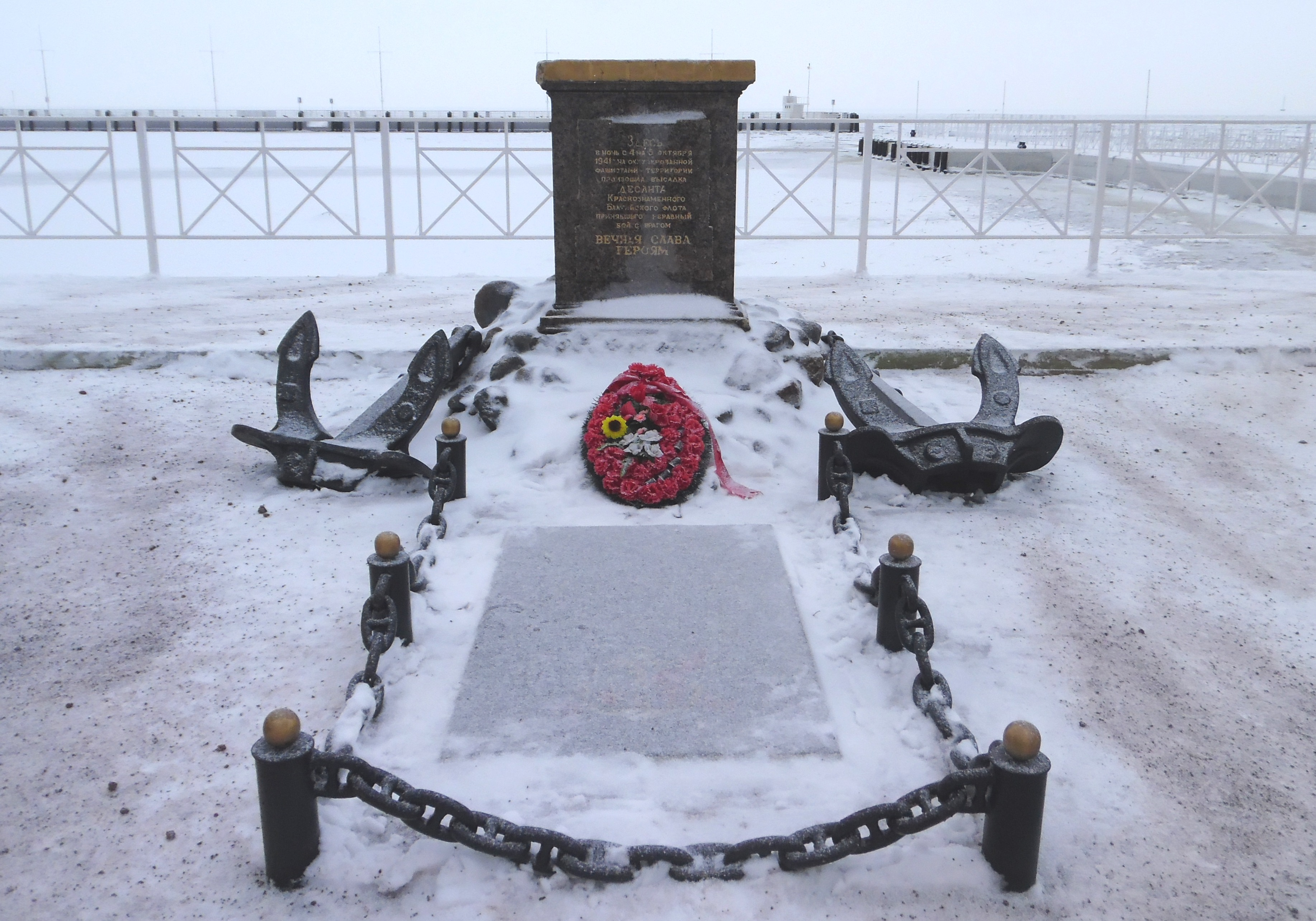
Monument of the naval landing in Lower Gardens of Peterhof near the pier.

On 23 September 1941 German troops captured Peterhof. Two weeks later, on 5 October 1941, Soviet troops tried to recapture the town and block the highway by naval landing. 510 marines of the Soviet Baltic Fleet landed on the beach of the neighboring park of Alexandria but faced a heavy fire from the Germans. The commander of the operation was killed, all landing troops became disorganised, one landing craft was sunk and another one missed. Despite Soviet attempts to cover the landing forces by coastal artillery from Kronstadt, they were quickly suspended because of lack of connection with the landing troops. Evacuation attempts also failed due to heavy German artillery shelling (only one marine was picked up from the water). The Peterhof landing operation failed and all landing troops were cut off from the shore and surrounded. Some of them reached the Lower Gardens and fought until the bitter end, including hand-to-hand combat. The last pockets of resistance were destroyed on 7 October. Several dozen German Shepherd dogs were released into the gardens to find the hiding marines. Many of the wounded marines were mauled to death and several were captured.

The occupying forces of the German Army largely destroyed Peterhof. Many of the fountains were destroyed, and the palace was partially exploded and left to burn. Restoration work began almost immediately after the end of the war and continues to this day. The Lower Park was reopened to the public in 1945.

The name was changed to "Petrodvorets" ("Peter's Palace") in 1944 as a result of wartime anti-German sentiment and propaganda, but the original name was restored in 1997 by the post-Soviet government of Russia.

The "purpose" of Peterhof was as a celebration and claim to access to the Baltic (while simultaneously, Peter the Great was also expanding on the Black Sea littoral).

== Gallery ==
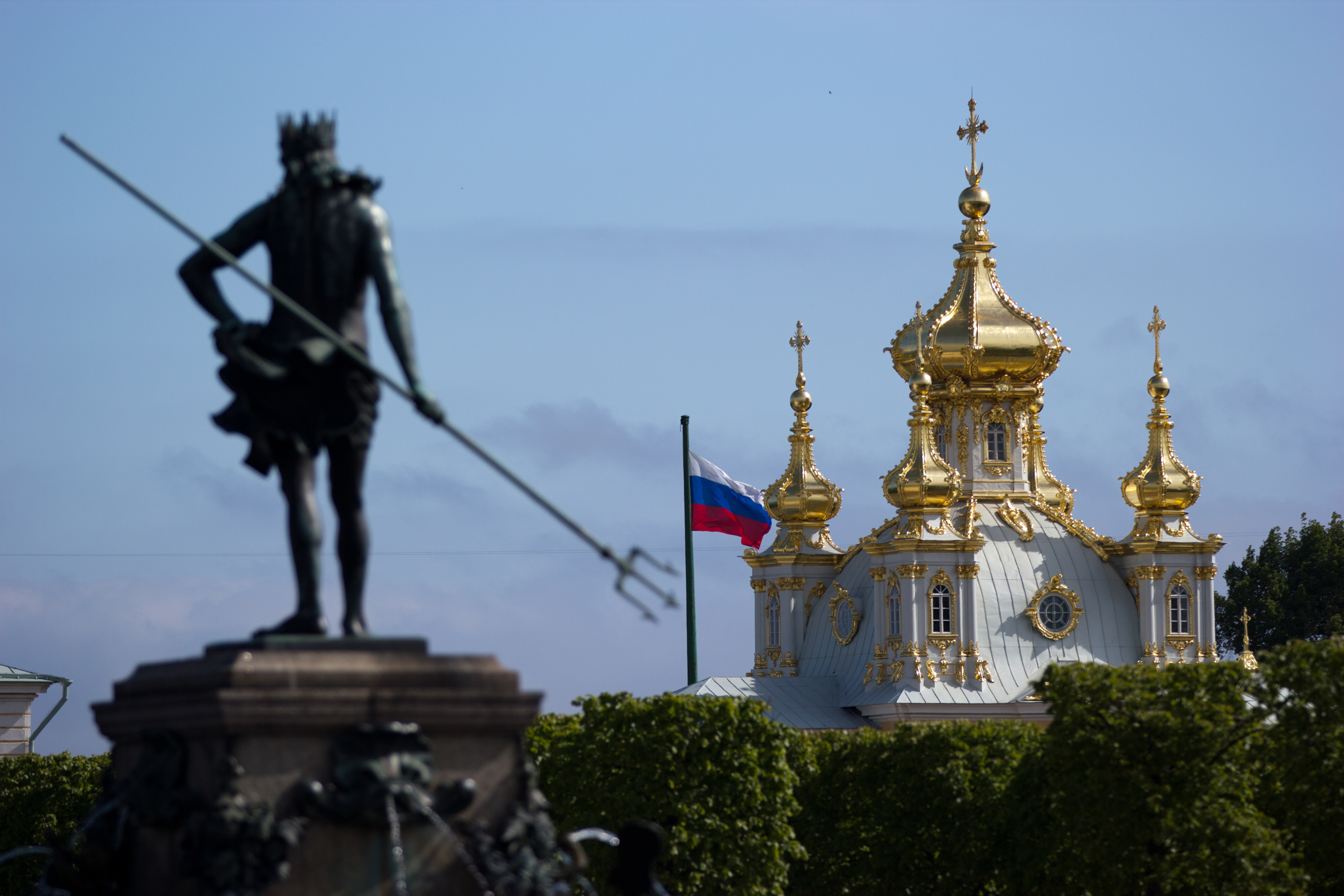
Poseidon and the palace church dome

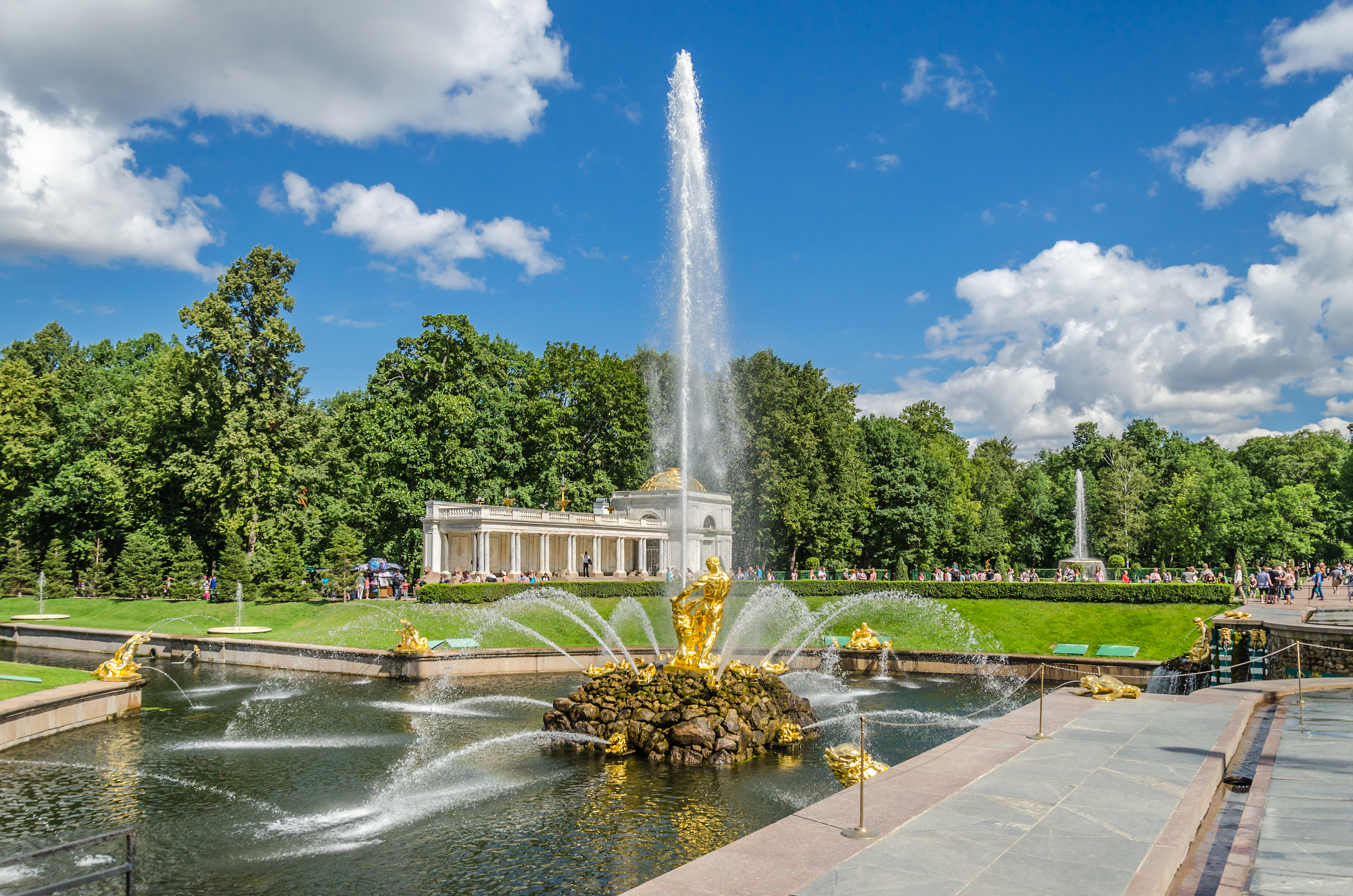
The 20-metre-high vertical jet of water from the lion's mouth of the Samson Fountain

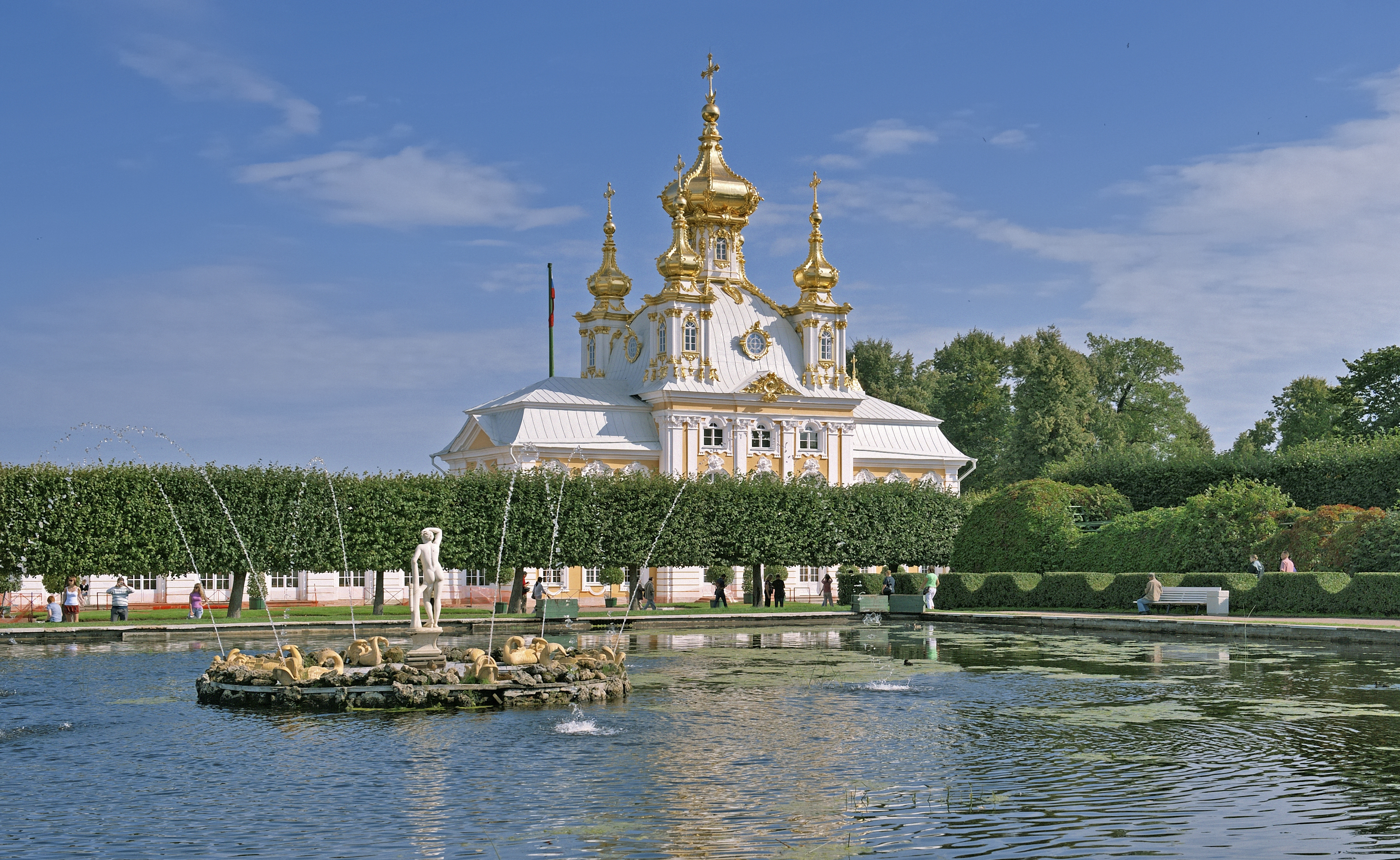
Church of the Grand Palace

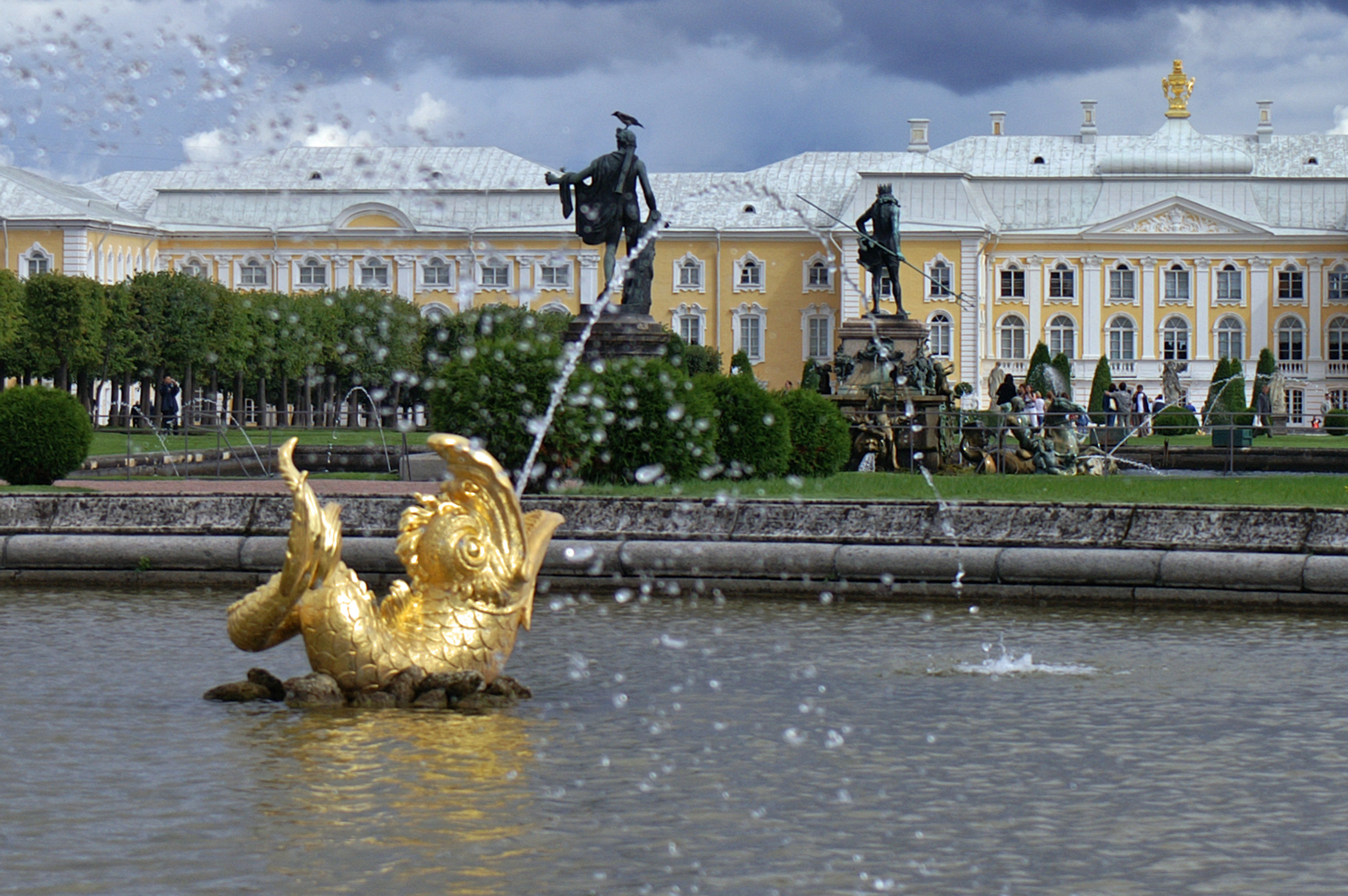
The Upper Gardens of Peterhof

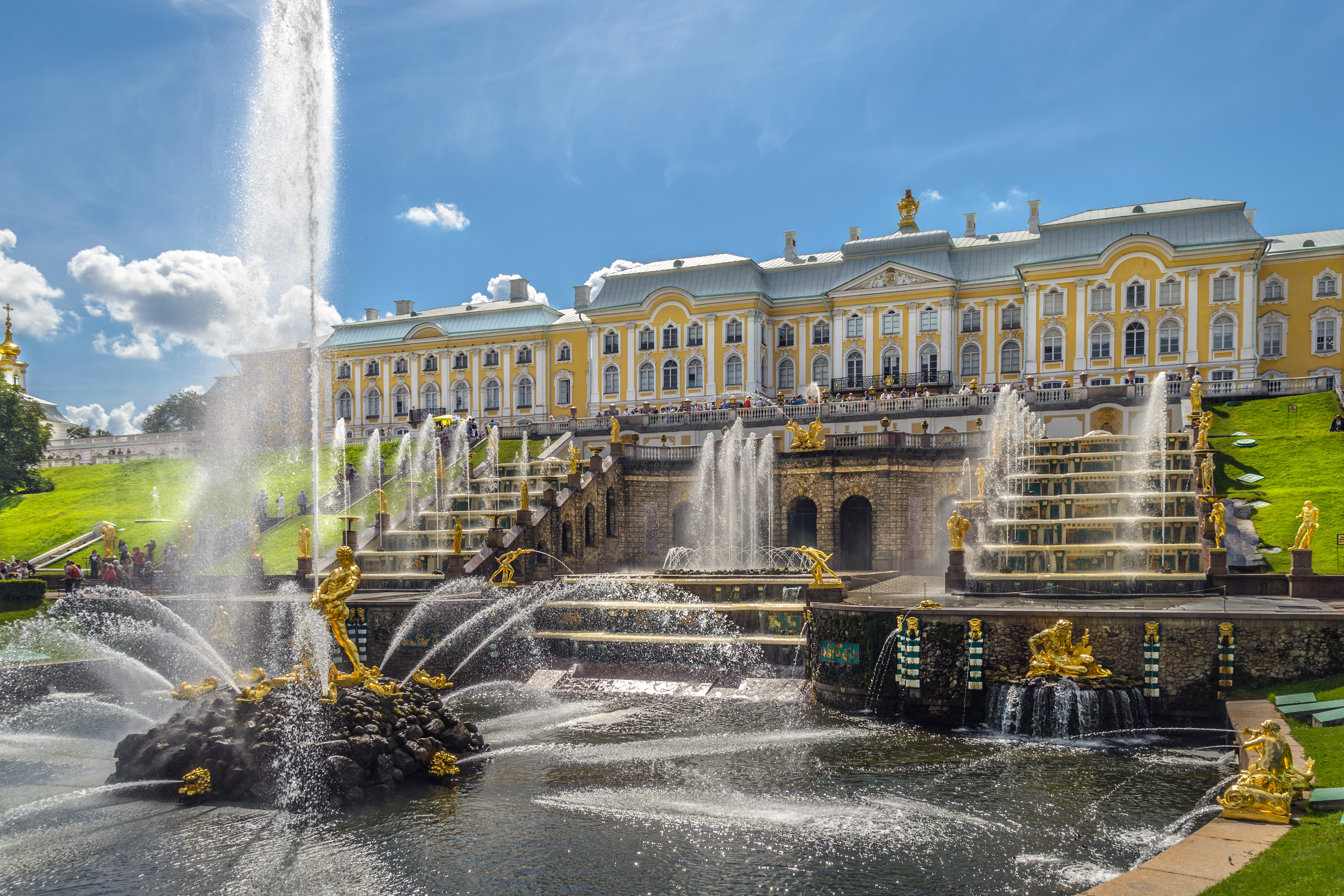
View of the Grand Cascade

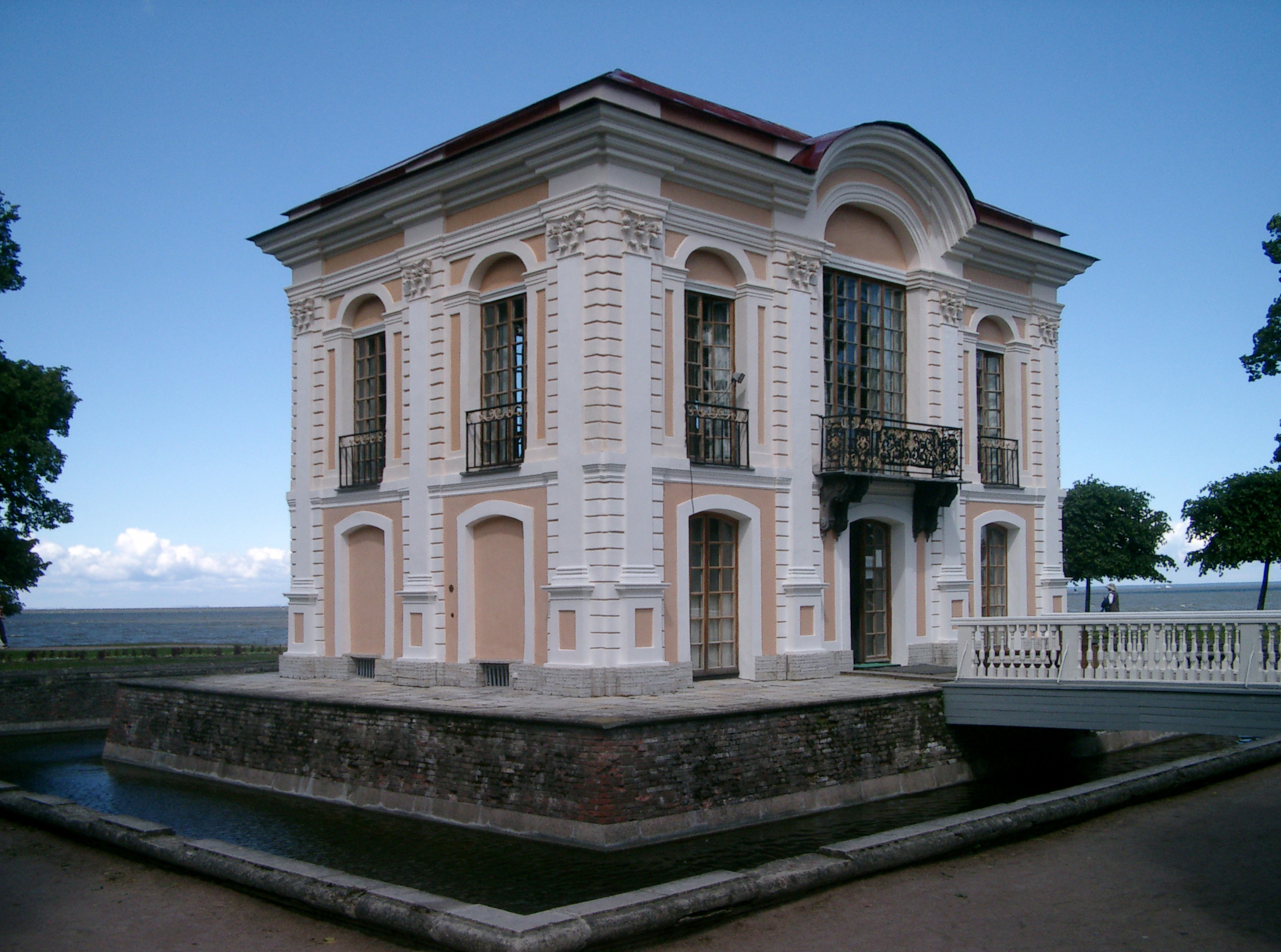
The Hermitage Pavilion in the Lower Gardens

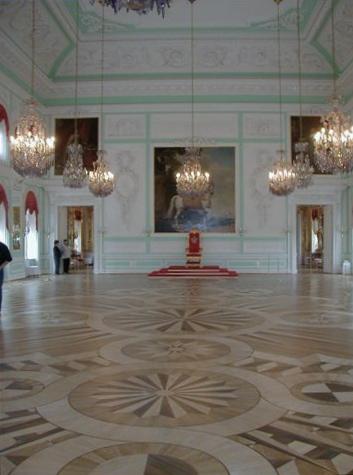
The Grand Throne Room

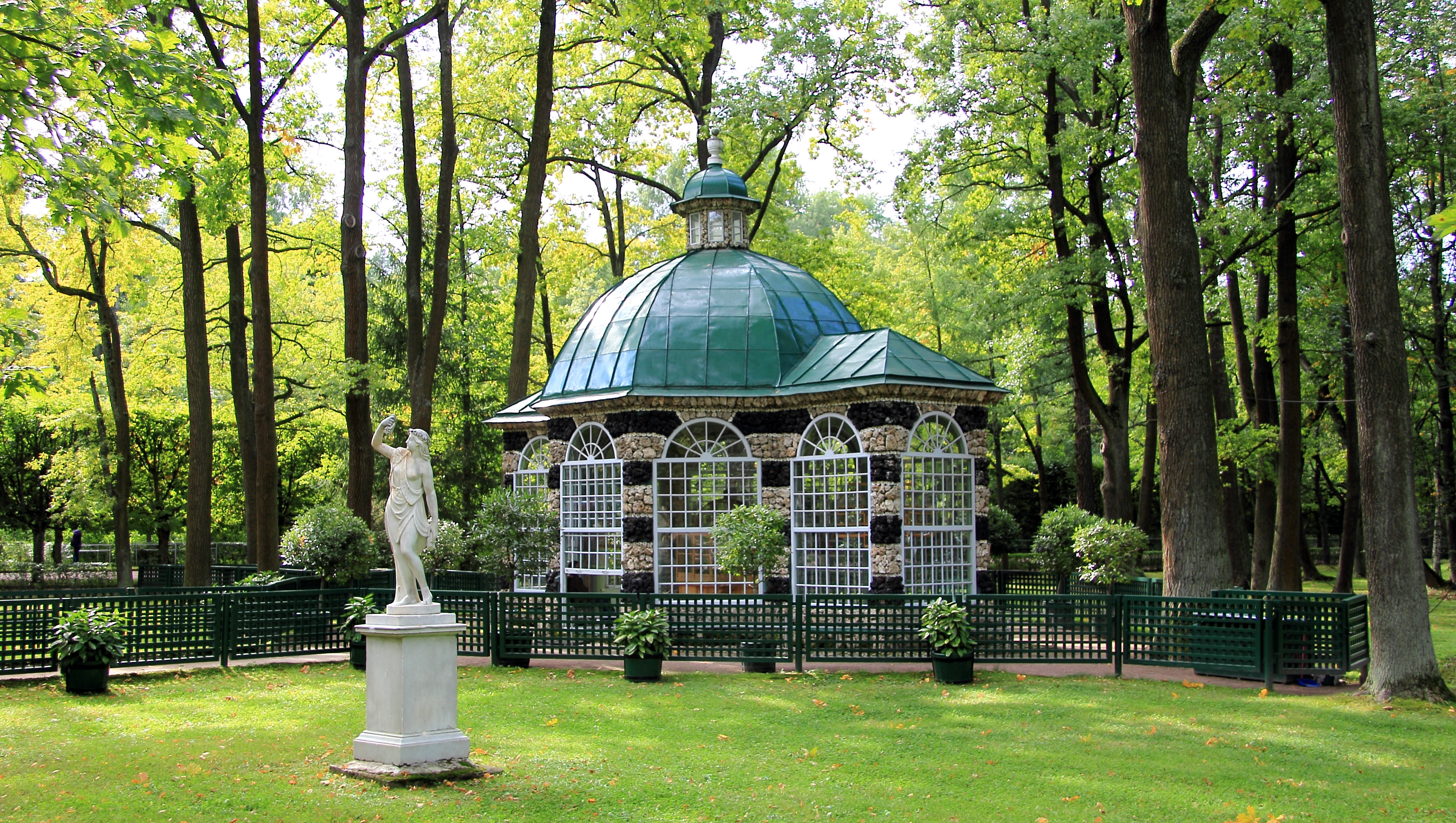
Aviary Pavilion

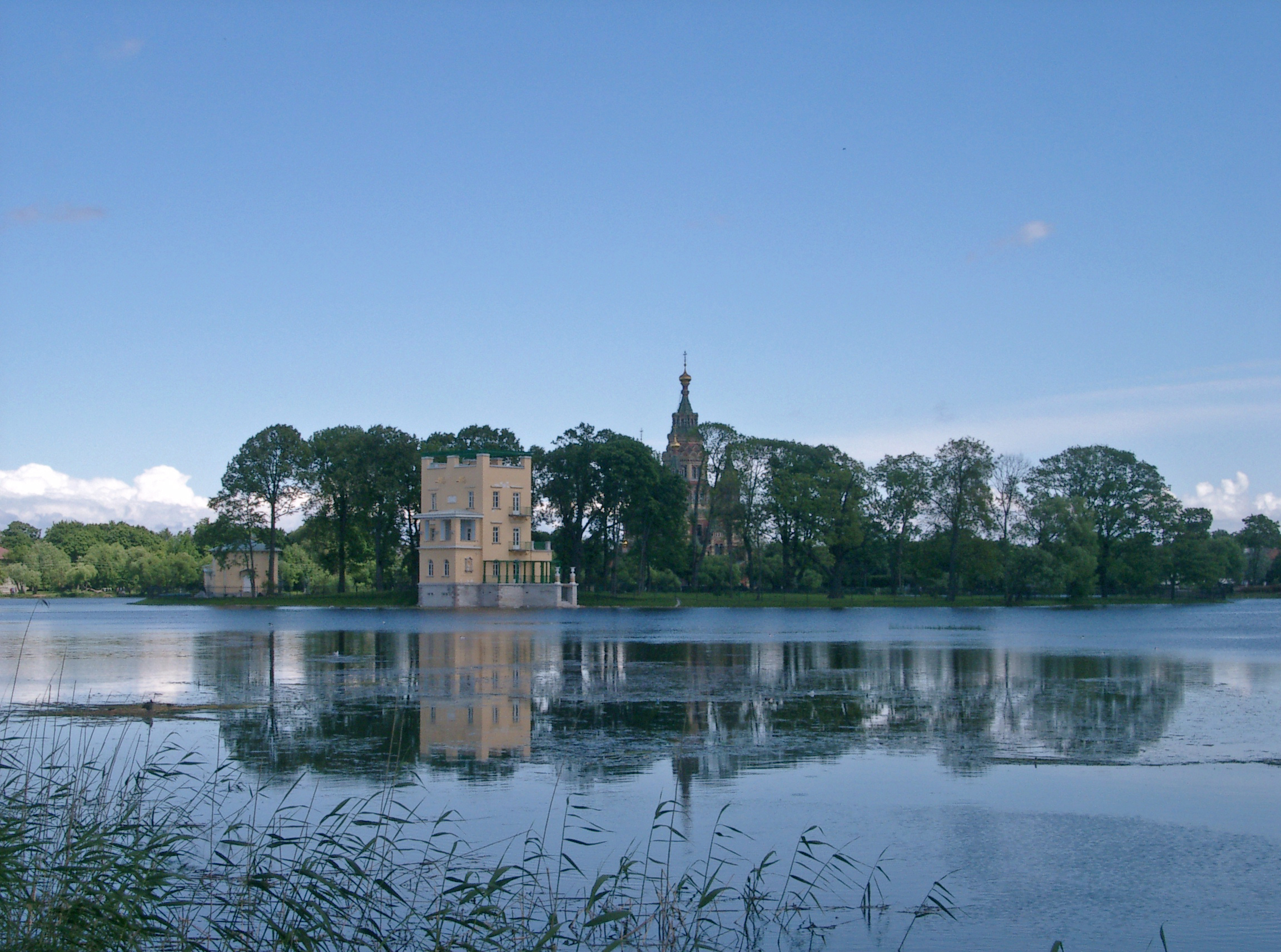
Olgin Pavilion

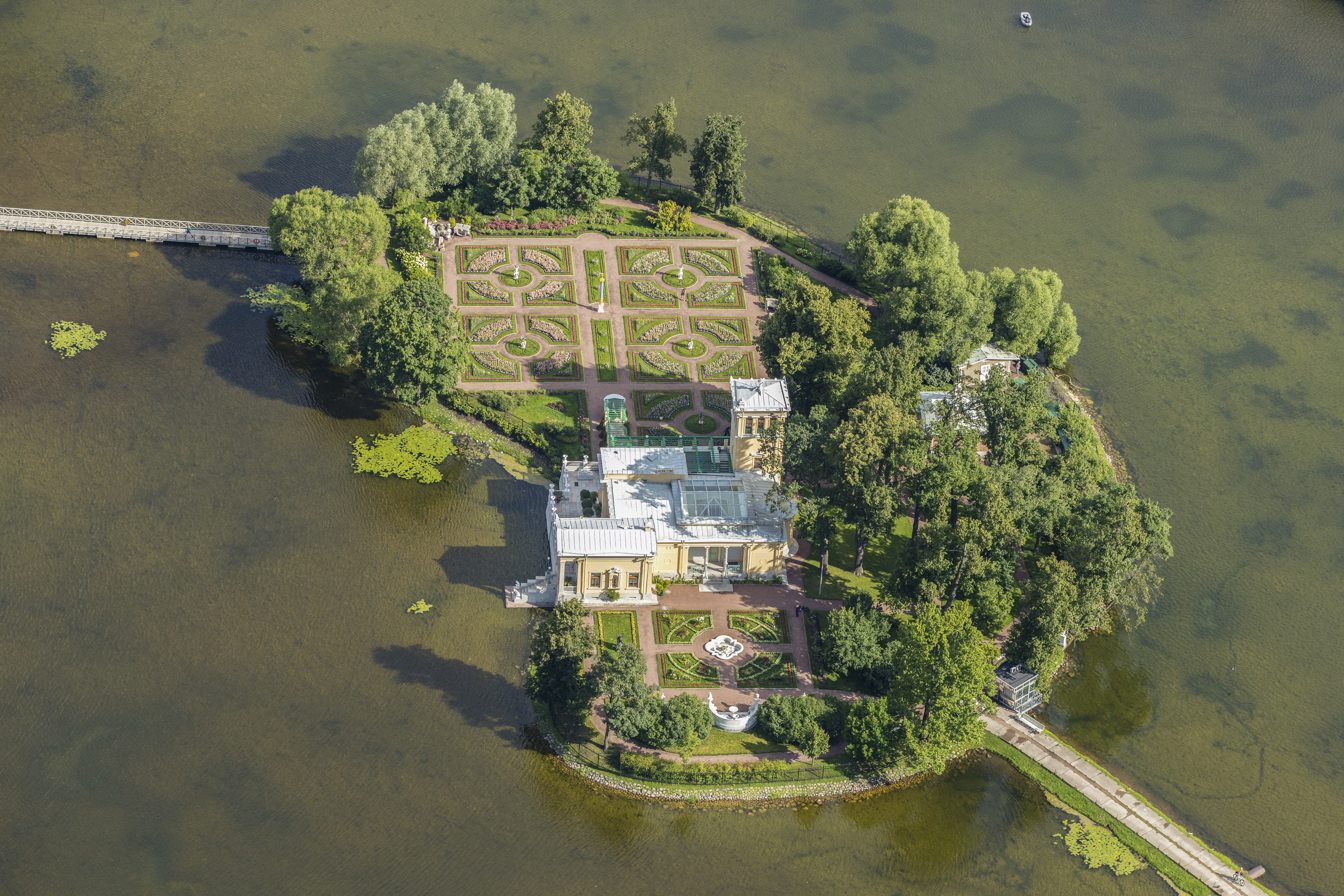
Tsarina's Pavilion

== See also ==
- List of Baroque residences
- Medici lions; the inspiration for the palace's Lion Cascade
- Peter the Great Statue
- Historic Centre of Saint Petersburg and Related Groups of Monuments
- List of World Heritage Sites in Russia
- Seven Wonders of Russia
