= Gothic Chapel (Peterhof) =

Orthodox church in Peterhof, Russia

Coordinates: 59°52′50″N 29°55′51″E

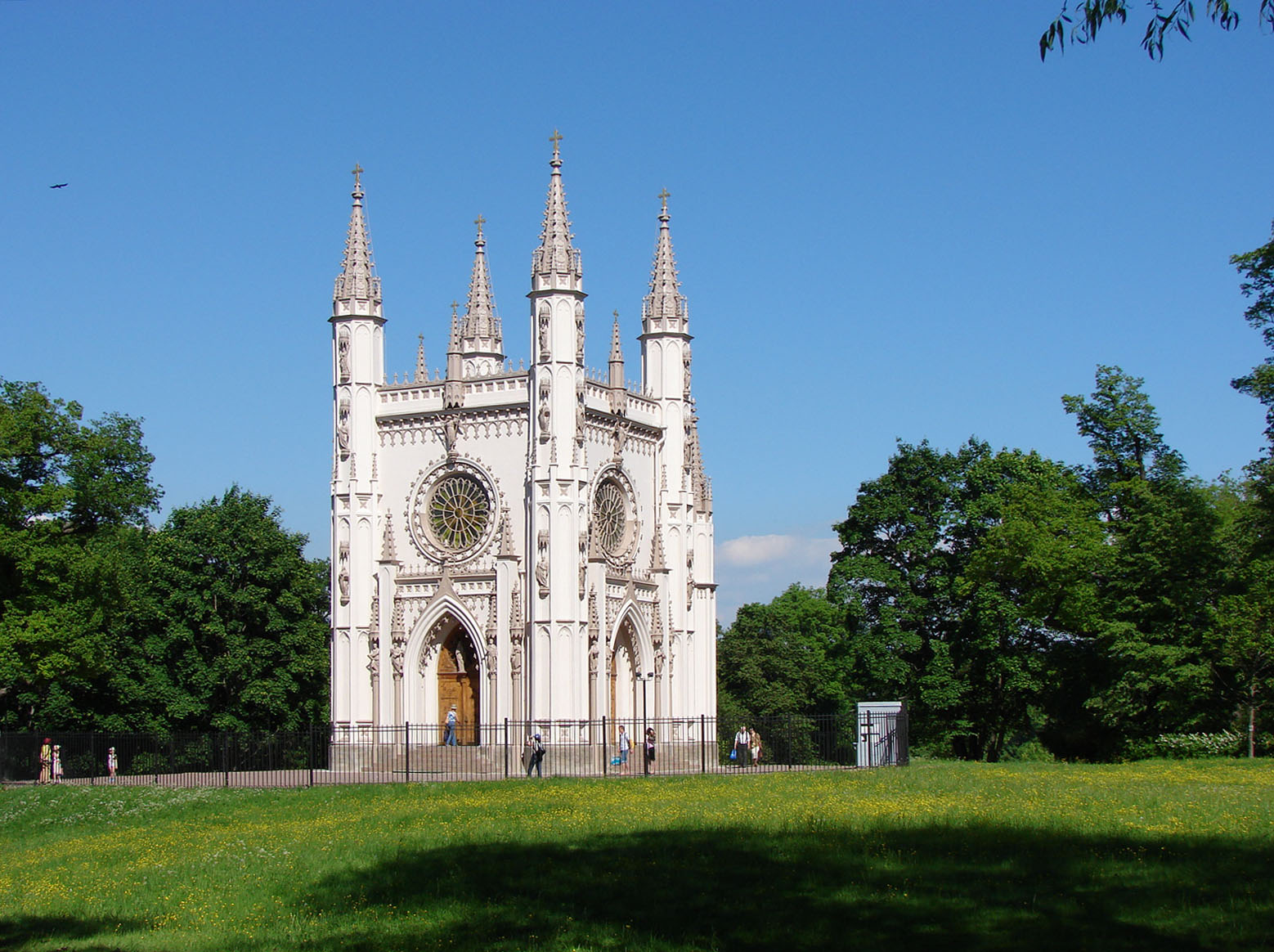
Schinkel's Gothic Chapel in Peterhof.

Gothic Chapel in Peterhof is an Orthodox church in the name of Saint Alexander Nevsky situated in the Alexandria Park of Petergof, Russia. It was designed at the request of Nicholas I of Russia by Karl Friedrich Schinkel in Gothic Revival style in 1829 and consecrated in July 1834. Prior to the Russian Revolution of 1917 this Gothic structure functioned as the private family church of the House of Romanov.

The church, complementing the Alexandria Park Cottage, a summer residence built by Adam Menelaws in 1826–1829, was erected in 1831–1834 under direction of Adam Menelaws and Ludwig Charlemagne. The sculptor Vasily Demut-Malinovsky designed 43 copper figures lining the walls. The iconostasis was designed and painted by Carl Timoleon von Neff. Later, in 1860s, the church acquired copies of paintings by the same artist; it housed numerous icons donated by the Romanovs. Most of this art perished in World War II; the interior was not restored until 1998.

During the reburial of Empress Maria Fyodorovna in September 2006, her coffin was brought to the chapel which served as her home church during the reign of Alexander III. A funeral service was held in the church on September 27.
