= Petergof =

Petergof Петергоф
- Municipal town
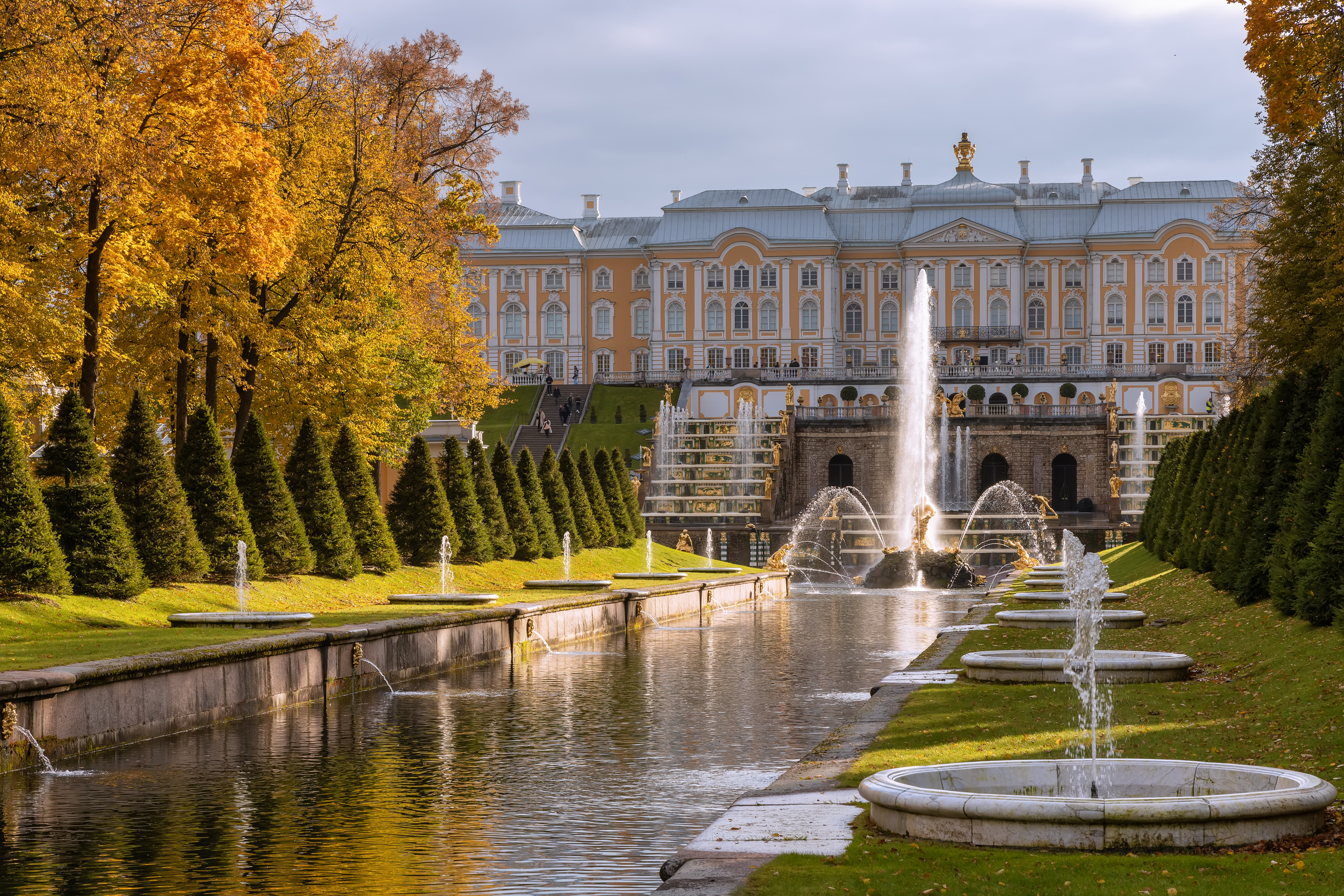
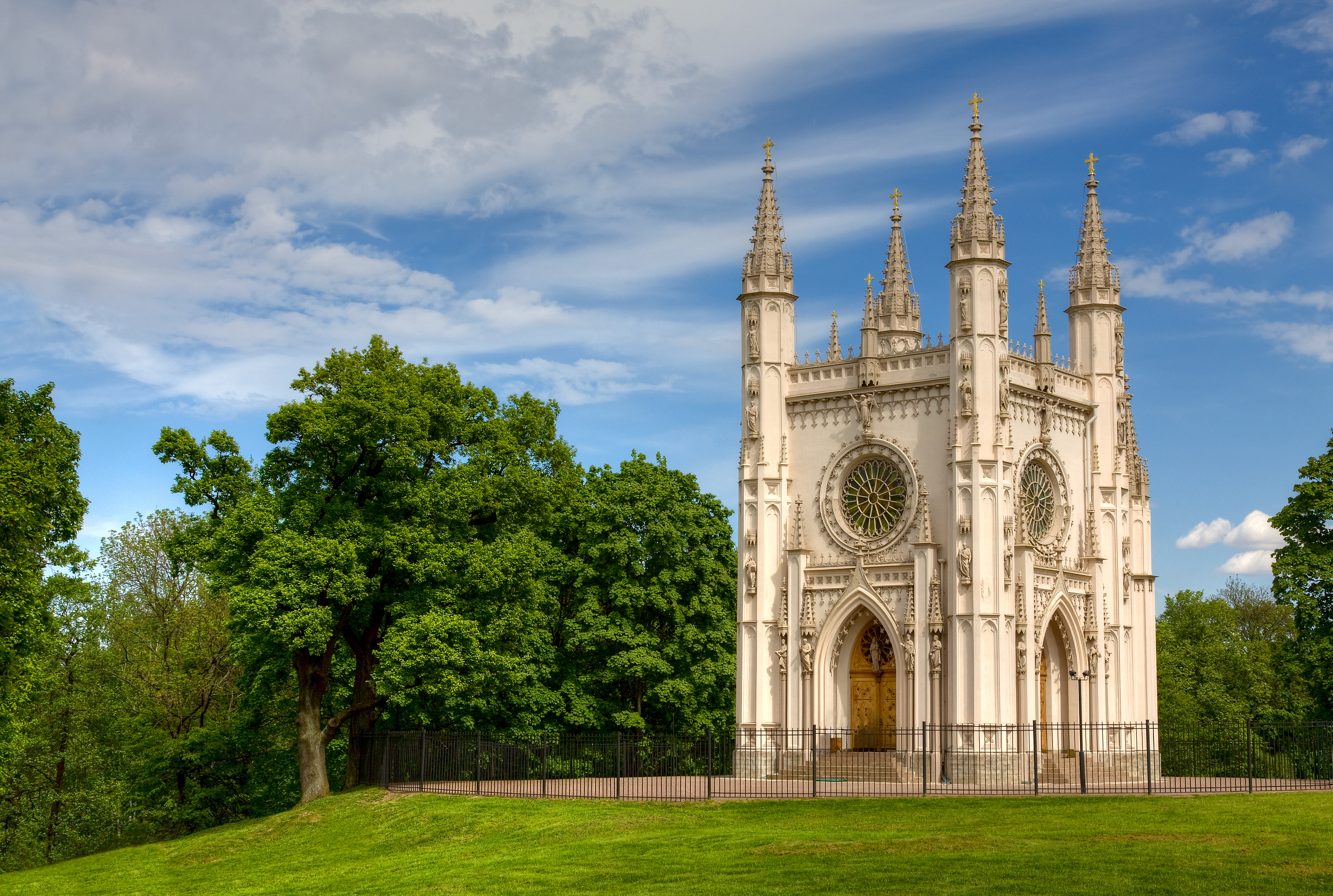
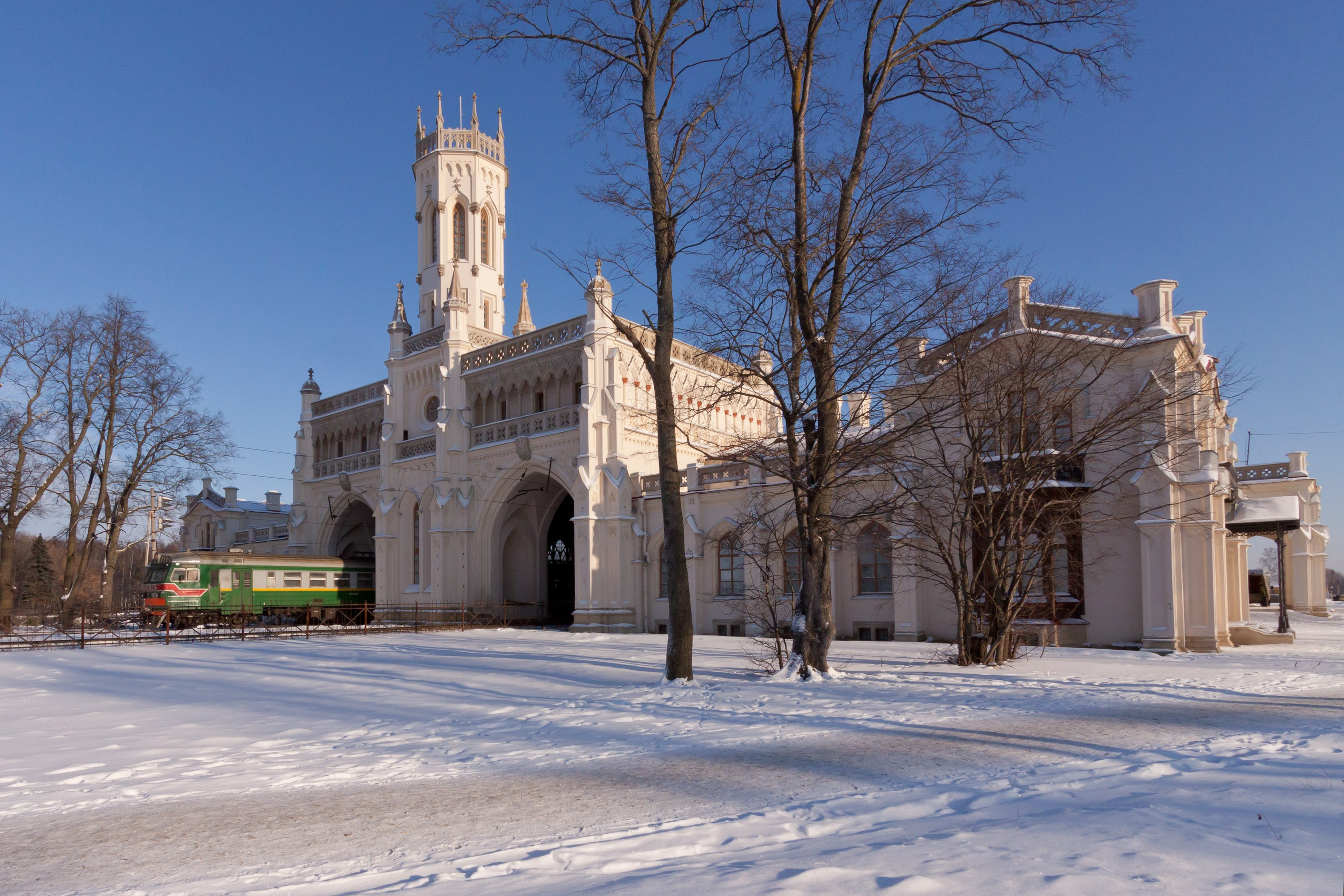

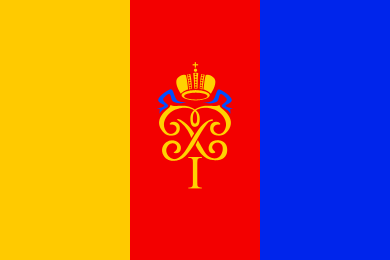
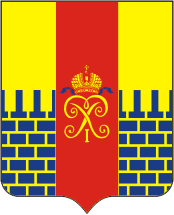
- Flag Coat of arms

- Location of Petrodvortsovy District in Saint Petersburg
- Interactive map of Petergof
- Location of Petergof Petergof (Saint Petersburg)
- Coordinates: 59°53′N 29°54′E
- Country: Russia
- Federal subject: Saint Petersburg
- Founded: 1711

Area
  - Total: 48.30 km^{2} (18.65 sq mi)

Population (2010 Census)
  - Total: 73,199
  - Estimate (2023): 80,701 (+10.2%)
  - Density: 1,516/km^{2} (3,925/sq mi)
- Time zone: UTC+
- Postal codes: 198510, 198516, 198517
- Dialing code: +7 +7 812
- OKTMO ID: 40395000

Petergof (Russian: Петерго́ф), or Peterhof and known as Petrodvorets (Петродворец) from 1944 to 1997, is a municipal town in Petrodvortsovy District of the federal city of St. Petersburg, located on the southern shore of the Gulf of Finland.

The town hosts one of two campuses of Saint Petersburg State University and the Petrodvorets Watch Factory, one of the leading Russian watch manufactures. A series of palaces and gardens, laid out on the orders of Peter the Great and sometimes called the "Russian Versailles", is also situated there. The palace-ensemble along with the city center is recognized as a UNESCO World Heritage Site.

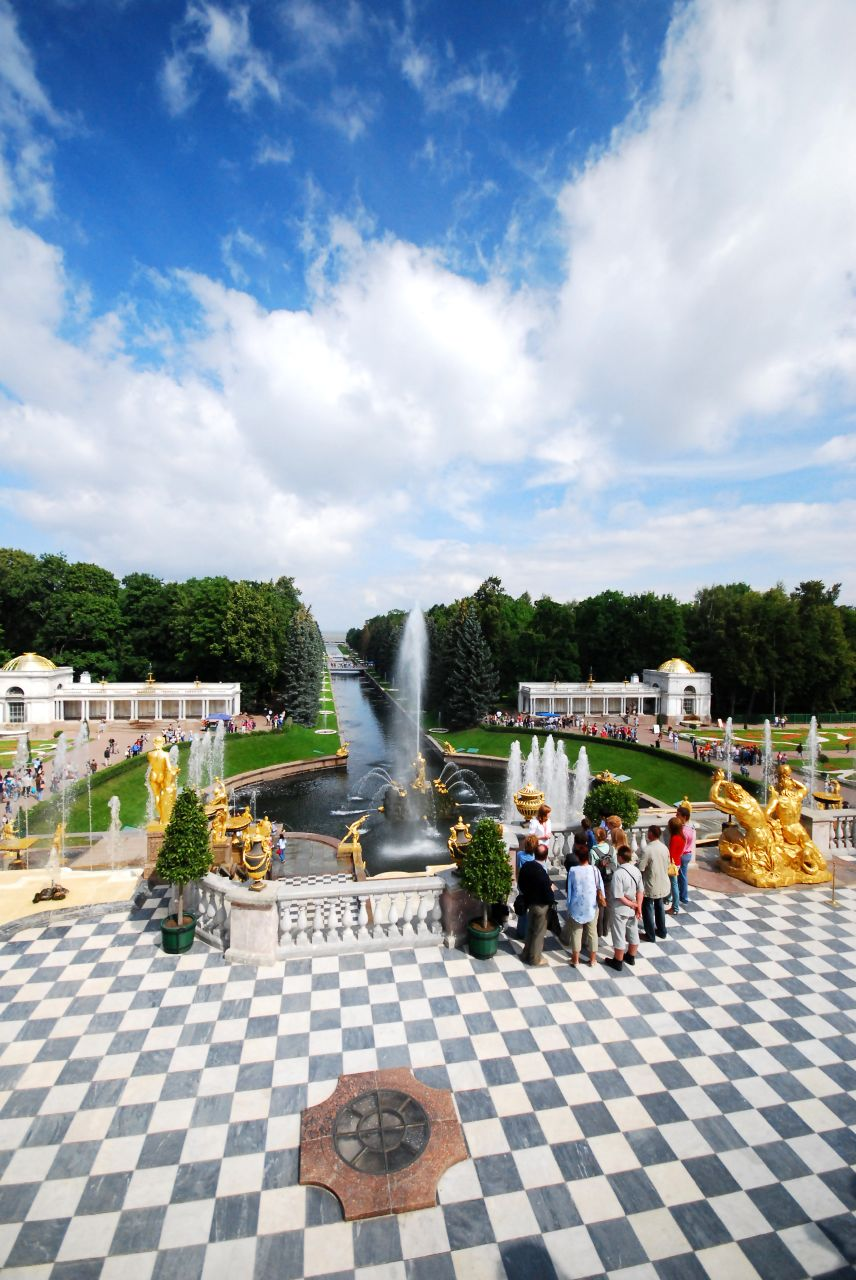
Peterhof Palace: the Samson Fountain and Sea Channel

== Palaces, fountains, and gardens ==
Petergof is named after the Peterhof Grand Palace, a sixteen-meter-high bluff lying less than a hundred meters from the shore. The so-called Lower Gardens (Nizhny Sad), at 1.02 square kilometers (0.39 sq mi) comprising the better part of the palace complex land area, are confined between this bluff and the shore, stretching east and west for roughly 200 meters (660 ft). The majority of Peterhof's fountains are contained here, as are several small palaces and outbuildings. East of the Lower Gardens lies the Alexandria Park with 19th-century Gothic Revival structures such as the Gothic Chapel.

Atop the bluff, near the middle of the Lower Gardens, stands the Grand Palace (Bolshoy Dvorets). To the south of it are the comparatively small Upper Gardens (Verkhny Sad). Upon the bluff's face below the Palace is the Grand Cascade (Bolshoy Kaskad). This and the Grand Palace are the centerpiece of the entire complex. At its foot begins the Sea Channel (Morskoy Kanal), one of the most extensive waterworks of the Baroque period, which bisects the Lower Gardens.

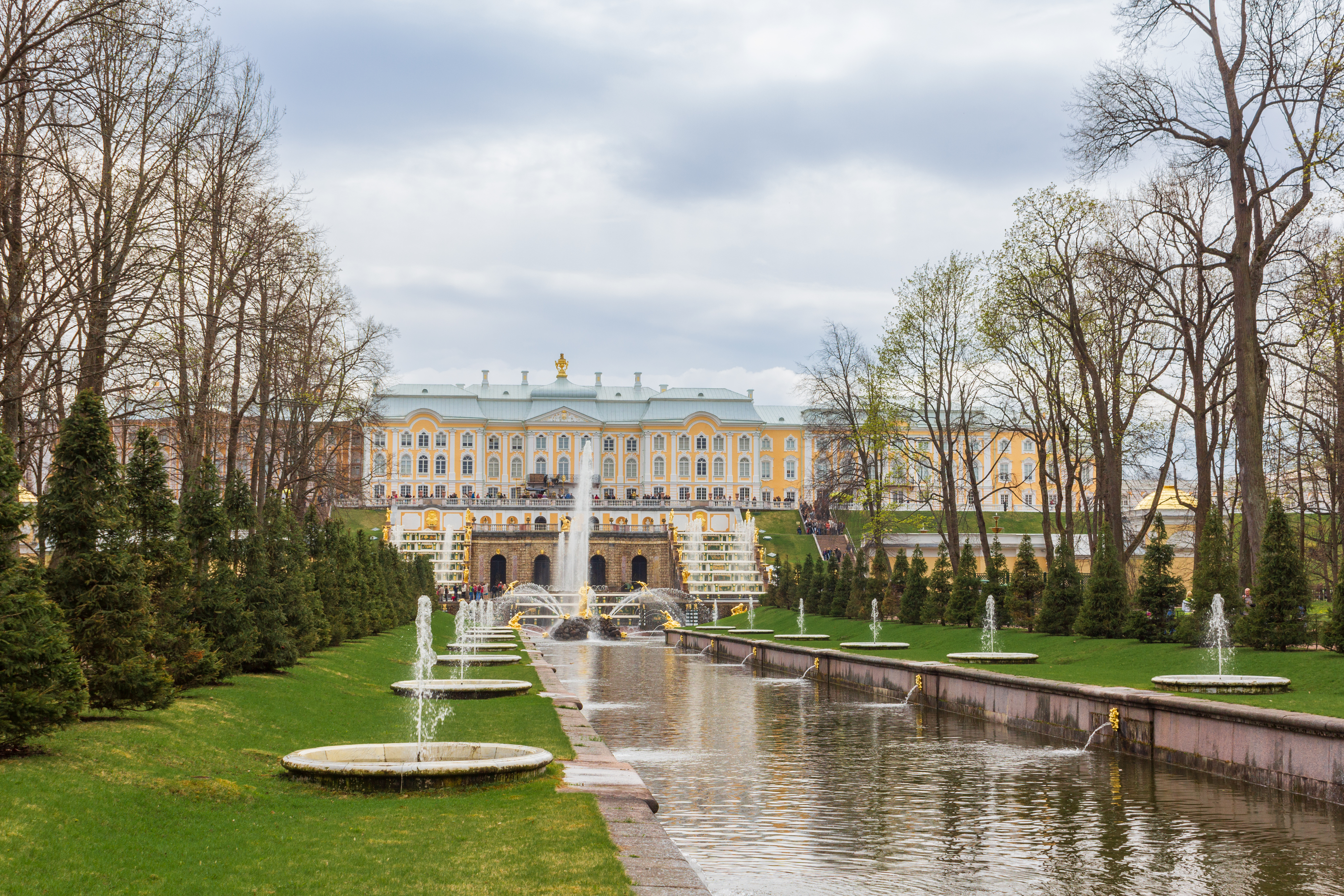
Grand Peterhof Palace and the Grand Cascade

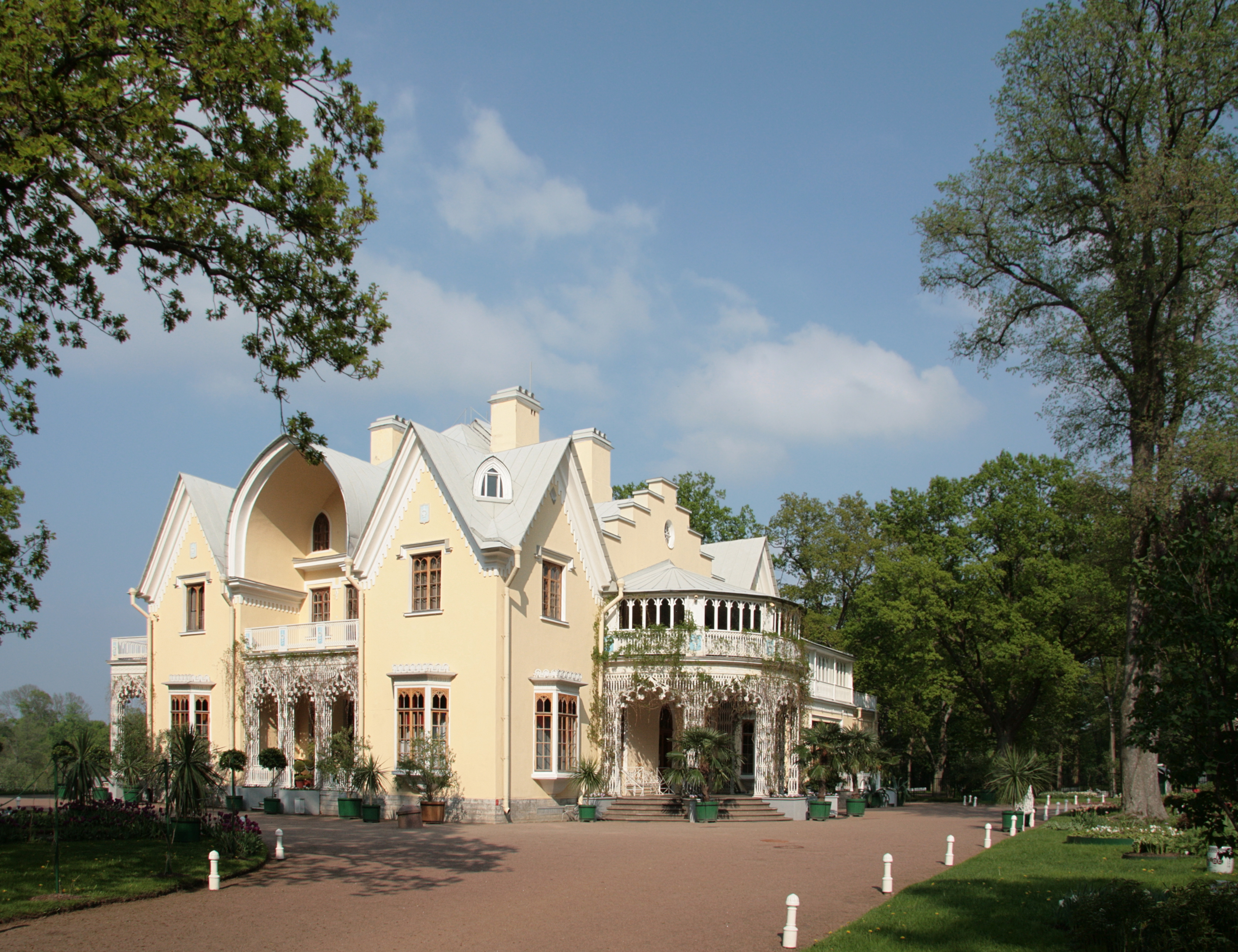
"Cottage" built in 1829 in Alexandria Park in Peterhof was a summer residence of Russian Emperor Nicholas I

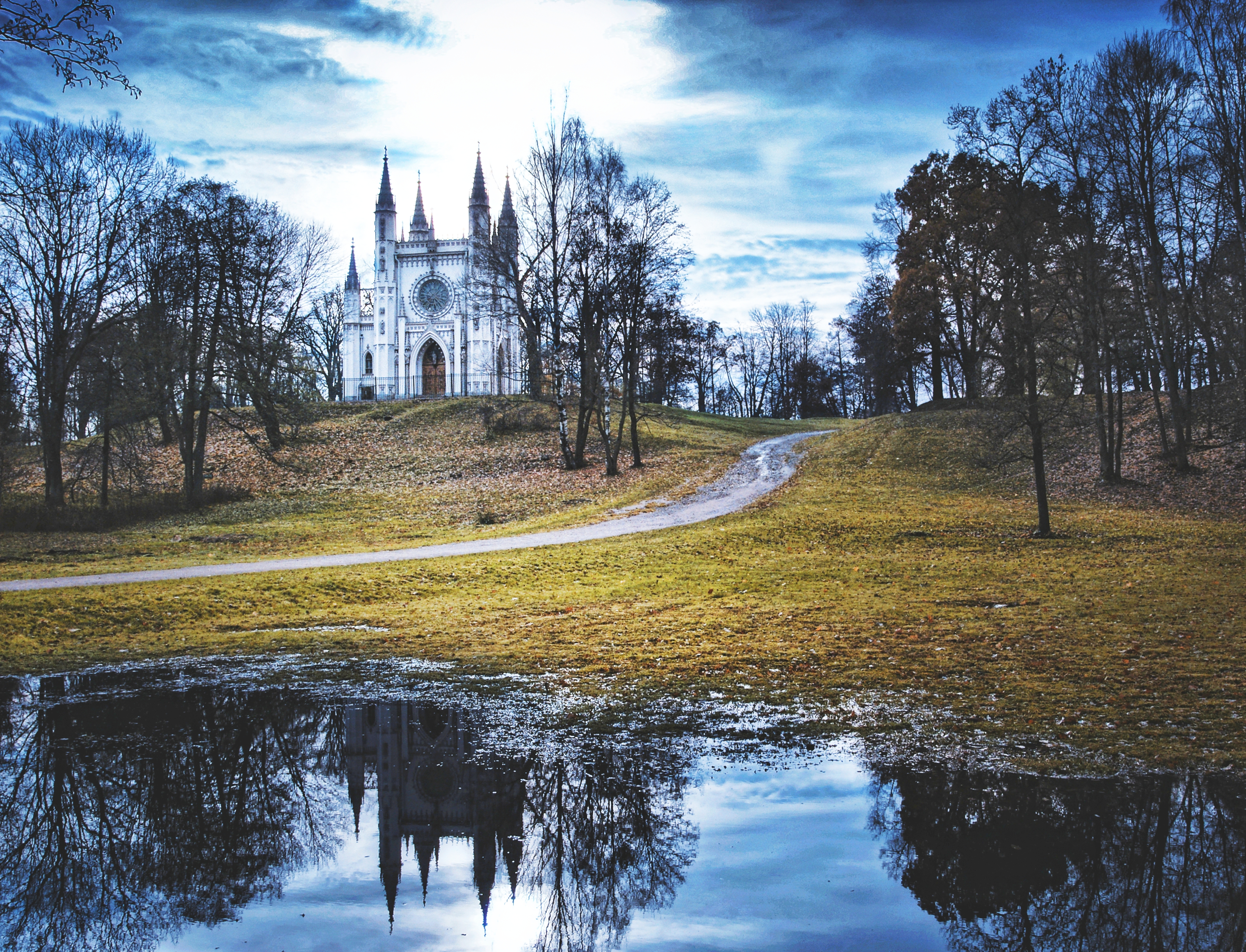
Church of Saint Alexander Nevsky, a gothic chapel built by Karl Friedrich Schinkel, in Alexandria Park, Peterhof

== St. Petersburg State University ==
Besides the downtown campus, certain Saint Petersburg State University's schools and departments are located in Petergof:

- Graduate School of Management's campus in Mikhailovka (under reconstruction)
- Faculty of Biology and Soil Studies' research center in Sergievka (Leuchtenberg Palace)
- Petrodvorets Complex including four faculties:

- Applied Mathematics and Control Processes
- Chemistry
- Mathematics and Mechanics
- Physics

- seven research institutes:

- Astronomy
- Chemistry
- Computational Mathematics and Control Processes
- Laser Research
- Mathematics and Mechanics
- Radiophysics
- Physics

- as well as 12 dormitories and a number of infrastructure objects.

The Petrodvorets Complex dates back to 1960s when it was decided to copy best international practices and to construct a brand-new suburban campus for the University, which had a crucial need for new premises. However, the idea was said to be widely opposed by the faculty, who did not want to commute two hours a day, and as few as four faculties relocated to Petergof.

In the 1990s the number of students from other regions fell significantly, and the University sold many of its downtown dormitories. When the trend reversed, the need for housing made the University administration accommodate most students in Petergof, even those studying in downtown faculties, which has created certain tensions. Still, the idea of a suburban campus seems to be persistent, as the Government of the Russian Federation has decided to hand over the Mikhailovka estate to the University to reconstruct it and house the Graduate School of Management's campus.

Due to the extensive presence of research facilities, mainly belonging to St. Petersburg State University, Petergof was named a naukograd in 2005.

== Petrodvorets Watch Factory ==
Russia's oldest factory was founded by Peter the Great in 1721 first as a lapidary plant to help in the construction of the Peterhof Palaces but also other Palaces in St. Petersburg. It started to produce equipment and parts for the watch industry in the 1920s. After World War II, the factory started to produce complete watches under the brand name Pobeda and from 1961 under the brand Raketa. in 1985 the factory had 7,500 employees and was producing 5 million mechanical watches per year. Today, it is the last watch factory in Russia producing its own movements from A to Z, though the production is much smaller than it used to be.

== Telegraph Station ==
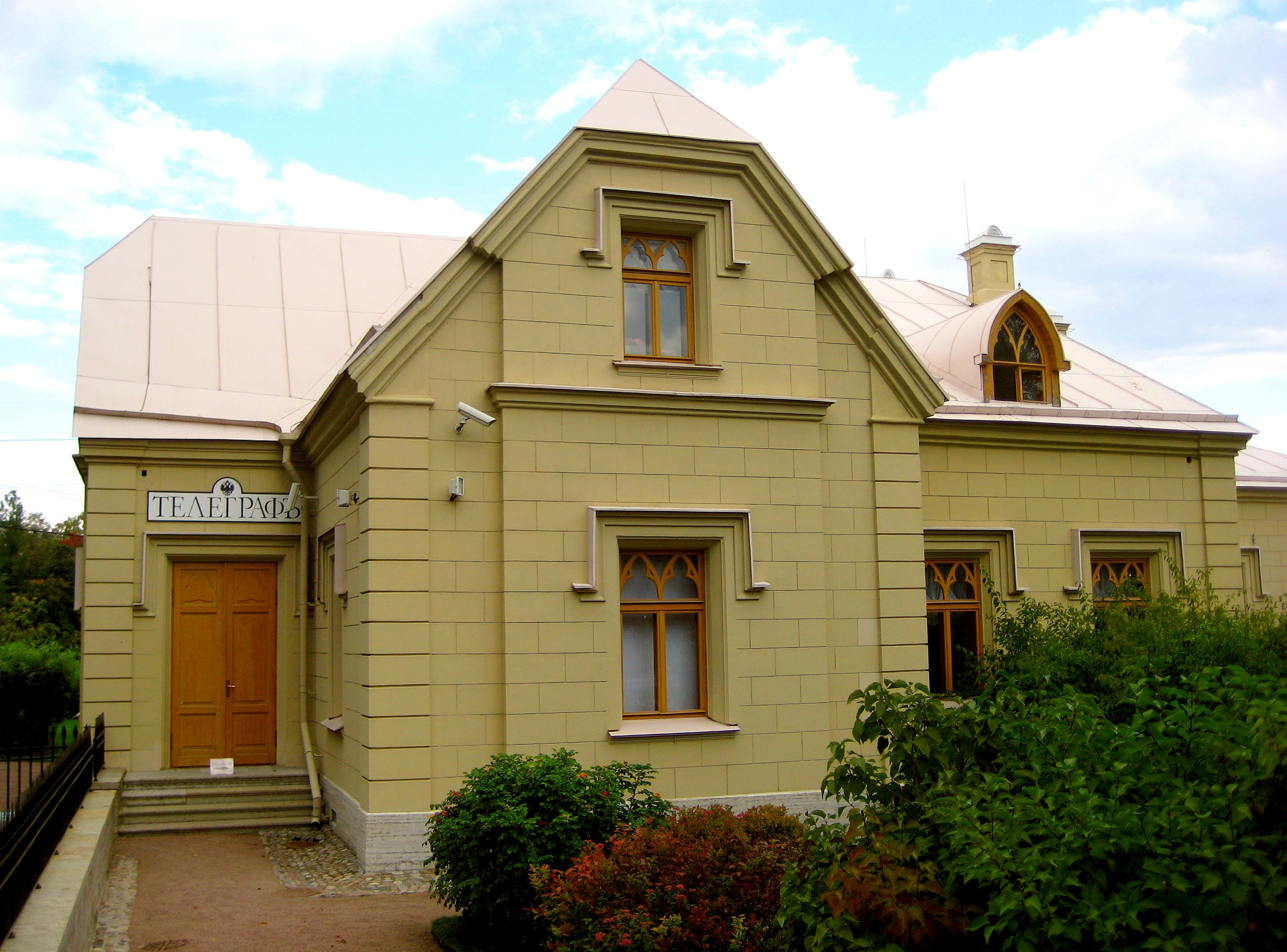
Telegraph House, Alexandria Park

== Transportation ==
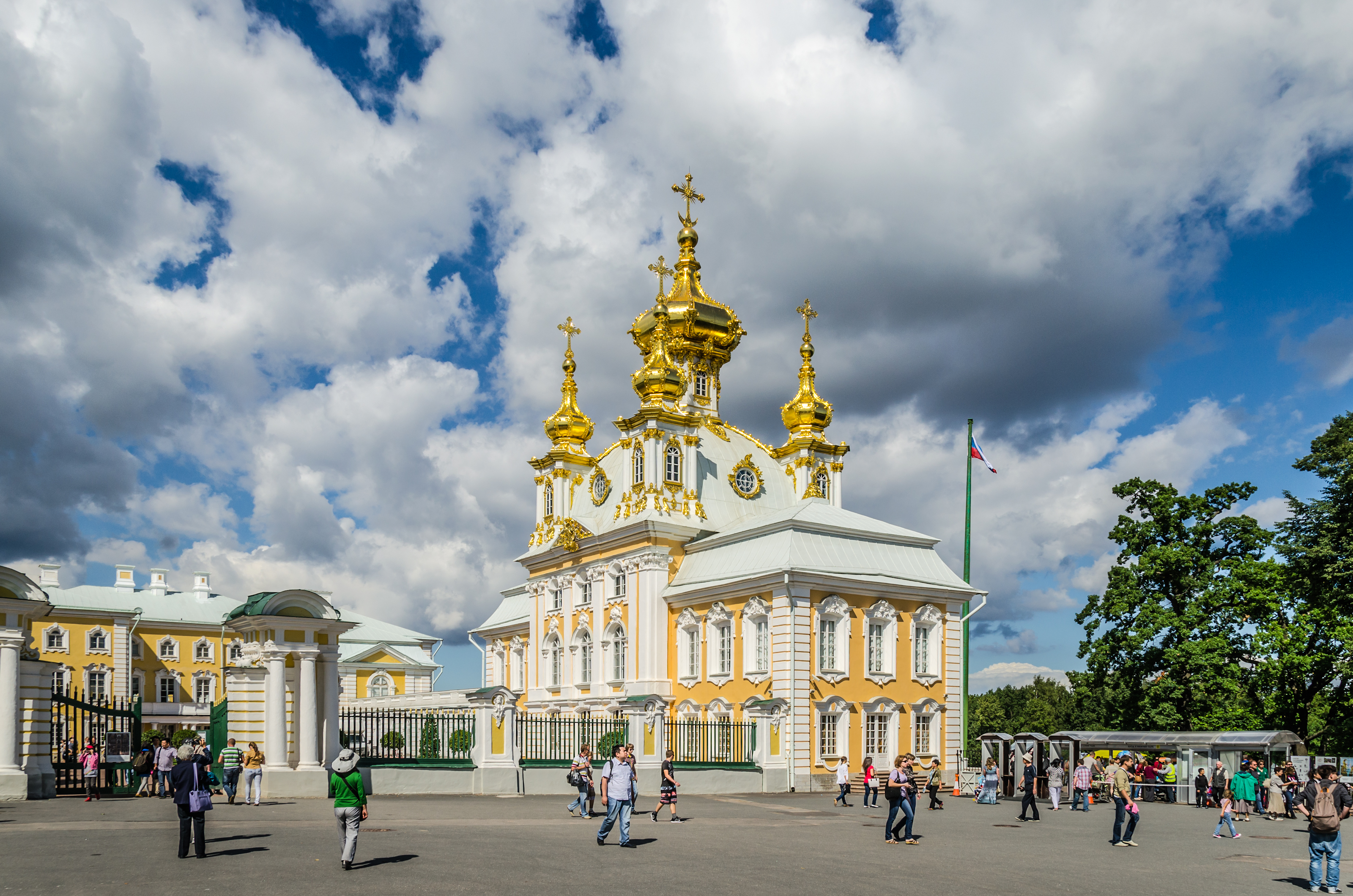
Church Wing of Grand Peterhof Palace

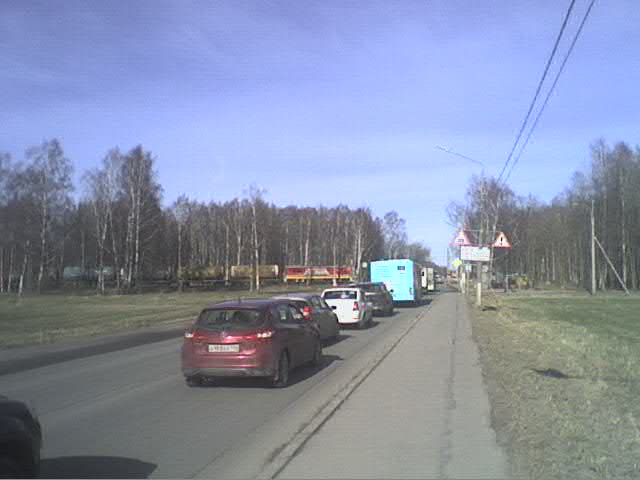
A freight train near a railway crossing in Peterhof.

The town is served by three railway stations (Novy Petergof, Stary Petergof, and Universitet). The palaces of Peterhof are accessible by sea via hydrofoils based near the Winter Palace in St. Petersburg. The palace is also accessed by road. Public transit and private van services make trips from Saint Petersburg.

The Upper Gardens are accessible, but entry to the Lower Gardens requires the purchase of tickets (not included in the boat fee for visitors arriving by hydrofoil). The palaces and grotto are accessible only as part of guided tours.

== Local government ==
Petergof is a municipal entity - an intracity territory of the federal city of St. Petersburg. Local self-government is carried out on the basis of the charter, which was adopted by the resolution of the municipal council of the municipal formation of the city of Petergof dated 5 November 2008 No. 54-n.

The current body of local self-government - the Municipal Council - has been operating since 1998. As a result of the elections on 14 September 2014, a new composition of the fifth convocation was elected (out of 19 deputies: 18 from United Russia and 1 from the Communist Party of the Russian Federation).

The head of the municipal district of Petergof (since 2019) is deputy of the Municipal Council Alexander Shifman.

The executive body of local self-government is the local administration, headed by Tatyana Yegorova.

== Sister cities ==
- Bad Homburg vor der Höhe, Germany
- Le Blanc-Mesnil, France

Former sister cities:

- Sopot, Poland

On 10 March 2022, the Polish town of Sopot terminated its partnership with Peterhof as a response to the 2022 Russian invasion of Ukraine.
