= Kseniinsky Institute =

Russian educational institution, 1894–1918

Kseninsky Institute of Noble Maidens
- Ксениинский институт благородных девиц
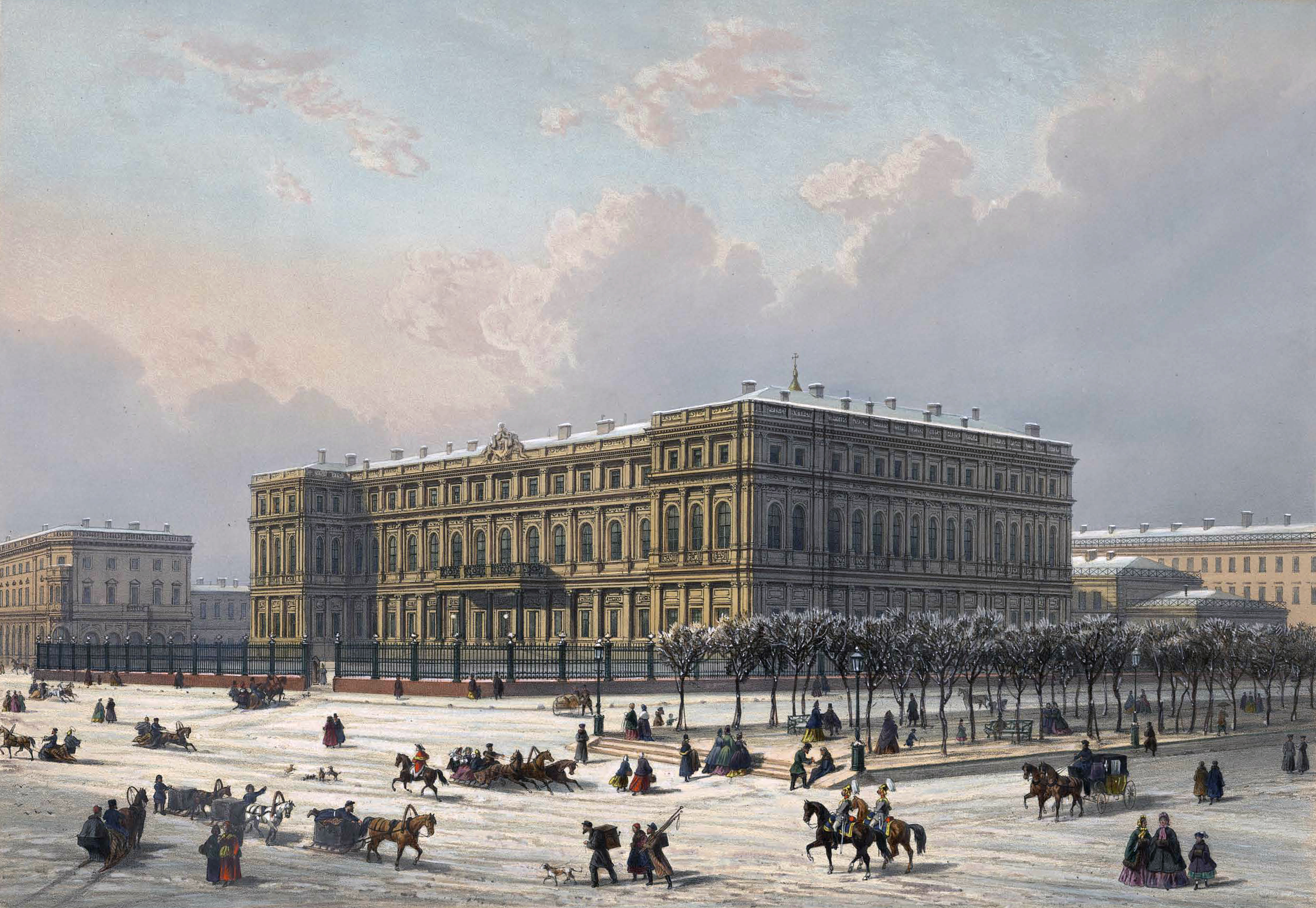
- Established: 1894
- Location: St. Petersburg, Russia
- Language: Russian

The Kseniinsky Institute for Noble Maidens (Russian: Ксениинский институт благородных девиц) is a former women's educational institution of the Russian Empire, part of the department of Institutions of Empress Maria, which existed from 1894 to 1918 in St. Petersburg.

== History ==
On 25 July 1894, by decree of Emperor Alexander III, in commemoration of the marriage of Grand Duchess Xenia Alexandrovna with Grand Duke Alexander Mikhailovich, the Kseniinsky Institute for Noble Maidens was established. The institute was created as a women's educational institution for the education and upbringing of orphans and half-orphans from noble families. The institute was part of the department of institutions of Empress Maria.

The Kseniinsky Institute was given the Nicholas Palace, which had previously been owned by Grand Duke Nikolai Nikolayevich. The palace was built from 1853 to 1861 by the architect Andrei Stackenschneider and his assistants Karl Ziegler and August Lange. At the palace there was an arena and a church, created by the architect N. V. Sultanov and consecrated on 12 February 1906 in the name of the Joy of All Who Sorrow icon, with a basement like a cave of the Empty tomb. From 1894 to 1895, for the needs of the institute, the building was rebuilt under the guidance of architects R. A. Gedike and I. A. Stefanits. On the first floor there was an apartment of the head of the institute, an office and living quarters for teachers. The two-height Banquet Hall was divided by a ceiling into two rooms. A stage for performances was set up in the lower one, and dormitories for pupils in the upper one. The classrooms are located on the second floor. The stable was rebuilt into a dining room, the arena was rebuilt into bedrooms. Architectural work cost the treasury 700,000 rubles. On 25 March 1895, the Kseniinsky Institute was solemnly opened, the ceremony was attended by Emperor Nicholas II, who presented the temple in the name of the icon of the Mother of God “Joy of All Who Sorrow” with a sacristy from the cover on the coffin of his father Alexander III.

In the Kseniinsky Institute, according to the Regulations approved by Emperor Alexander III, half-orphans and orphans of personal and hereditary nobles, headquarters and chief officers, generals and civil ranks who did not have the necessary funds to support their daughters were accepted at the expense of the treasury. Children of nobles (both hereditary and personal), who were not in the service, were accepted only as scholarships or for a fee. When entering the institute, it was necessary to be able to write and read in Russian, French and German, as well as to know the set of basic prayers. The Kseniinsky Institute was designed for three hundred and fifty pupils, in terms of its status it was lower than the Smolny Institute of Noble Maidens. The students of the institute included 175 paid boarders and 175 government boarders. Three hundred schoolgirls over ten years old were placed in the building of the institute, and fifty boarders aged eight to ten years old were placed in the juvenile department of the Nikolaev Orphan's Institute. The ten-year course of study at the institute included three professional and seven general classes. In the three professional classes, two departments were created: fine needlework and counters, clerks and accountants. The difference between the Ksenia Institute and other institutes for noble maidens was that the pupils of this institute were taught to do much of what was done by servants at other institutes: they sewed and mended linen, made their own beds and kept their shoes in order, and from among high school students kitchen and storeroom attendants were appointed.

Since 1914, during the First World War, the number of pupils was three hundred and eight pupils, in 1915 - three hundred and forty-four pupils, in 1916 - three hundred and forty-eight pupils. On 4 March 1918, the last graduation of the Ksenia Institute took place and the remaining boarders were transferred to the building of the Nikolaev Orphan Institute. After the October Revolution, by the Decree of the Council of People's Commissars of the RSFSR, the building of the Ksenin Institute was given to trade union organizations and received the name "Palace of Labor".

== Management ==
- Viktor von Wahl
- Knyaz Golitsina, Evgenia Alexandrovna

== Trustees ==
- Trubnikov, Alexander Alexandrovich

== Notable teachers ==
- Barsukov, Ivan Platonovich
- Marschner, Ludwig Khristoforovich
- Barskov, Yakov Lazarevich
- Zhivotovsky, Sergey Vasilievich
- Nikolai Mikhailovich Karinsky
- Alexei Davidov
- Almedingen, Alexander Nikolaevich
- Muntz, Oscar Rudolfovich

== Famous graduates ==
- Nina Vanna

== Literature ==
- Санкт-Петербург. Петроград. Ленинград: Энциклопедический справочник / Белова Л. Н., Булдаков Г. Н., Дегтярев А. Я. и др.; Москва: Great Russian Encyclopedia, 1992. — 687 с.
- Санкт-Петербург : энциклопедия / Междунар. благотворительный фонд им. Д. С. Лихачева; [науч. ред. Б. Ю. Иванов и др.]. - 2-е изд., испр. и доп. - Санкт-Петербург : Бизнес-пресса; Москва : РОССПЭН, 2006. — 1021 с. — ISBN 5-8110-0107-X

== Sources ==
- "Ксениинский институт благородных девиц". Историко-культурно-познавательный журнал о Санкт-Петербурге.
- "Ксенинский институт". Историко-культурно-познавательный журнал о Санкт-Петербурге.
- "Николаевский дворец — Женский институт им. великой княжны Ксении Александровны". Архитектурный сайт Санкт-Петербурга.
