= Duchess Alexandra of Oldenburg =

Grand Duchess Alexandra Petrovna of Russia (1838–1900)

Duchess Alexandra
- Grand Duchess Alexandra Petrovna of Russia
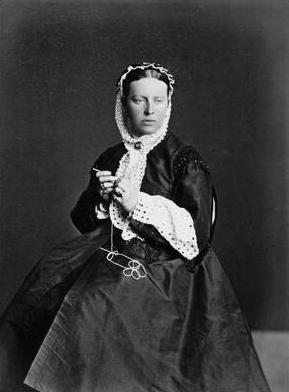
- Born: 2 June 1838; St. Petersburg, Russian Empire
- Died: 25 April 1900 (aged 61); Kiev, Russian Empire
- Spouse: Grand Duke Nicholas Nikolaevich of Russia (m. 1856; died 1891)
- Issue: Grand Duke Nikolai Nikolaevich; Grand Duke Peter Nikolaevich
Names
- Alexandra Frederica Wilhelmina; German: Alexandra Friederike Wilhelmine
- House: Holstein-Gottorp
- Father: Duke Peter Georgievich of Oldenburg
- Mother: Princess Therese of Nassau-Weilburg

Grand Duchess Alexandra Petrovna of Russia (Russian: Алекса́ндра Петро́вна Ольденбу́ргская, romanized: Aleksándra Petróvna Ol'denbúrgskaya; born Duchess Alexandra Frederica Wilhelmina of Oldenburg, German: Alexandra Friederike Wilhelmine Herzogin von Oldenburg; 2 June 1838 – 25 April 1900) was a great-granddaughter of Emperor Paul I of Russia and the wife of Grand Duke Nicholas Nikolaevich of Russia, the elder.

She was the eldest daughter of Duke Peter of Oldenburg and his wife Princess Therese of Nassau-Weilburg. She grew up in Russia in close proximity to the Romanovs as her father was a nephew of Tsar Nicholas I of Russia. Alexandra's parents were artistically gifted and passionate philanthropists. They provided a good education for her and inspired in Alexandra a life of service to those in need.

Alexandra married in 1856, Grand Duke Nicholas Nikolaevich of Russia, the third son of Tsar Nicholas I and her first cousin once removed. Alexandra, who had been raised in the Lutheran church, converted to the Orthodox faith, and took the name Grand Duchess Alexandra Petrovna of Russia. The couple had two children: Grand Duke Nicholas Nikolaevich of Russia (1856–1929), the younger, and Grand Duke Peter Nikolaevich of Russia (1864–1931). The marriage, arranged by the Russian Imperial family in an attempt to control the Grand Duke's excesses, was unhappy. She was plain, serious and liked simplicity. Deeply religious and very involved in charity work, Alexandra founded a training institute for nurses in St Petersburg in 1865. The same year, her husband began an affair with a ballerina, forming a second family with his mistress.

After the collapse of her marriage, Alexandra lived separated from her husband who expelled her from their household in 1879. A carriage accident left her almost completely paralyzed and, in November 1880, Alexandra went abroad to improve her health, compelled by her brother-in-law Tsar Alexander II. The following year, she asked her nephew, Tsar Alexander III, to allow her to return to Russia and she settled in Kiev. She recovered her mobility and, in 1889, she founded the Pokrovsky Nunnery, Kiev, a convent of nursing nuns with its own hospital, to provide free treatment for the poor. She dedicated the rest of her life to the work at the hospital. In 1889, she became an Orthodox nun under the name Anastasia, but kept this secret until her death. She died at the convent in 1900.

== Early life ==
Alexandra Frederica Wilhelmina was born at her parents' palace at Embarkment, 2 in St. Petersburg on 2 June [O.S. 21 May] 1838, as a Duchess of Oldenburg. She was the eldest of the eight children of Duke Peter of Oldenburg and his wife Princess Therese of Nassau-Weilburg, half-sister of Sofia of Nassau, queen consort of Oscar II of Sweden. Alexandra belonged to the House of Holstein-Gottorp but grew up in Russia, where her family was closely related to the Romanov dynasty.

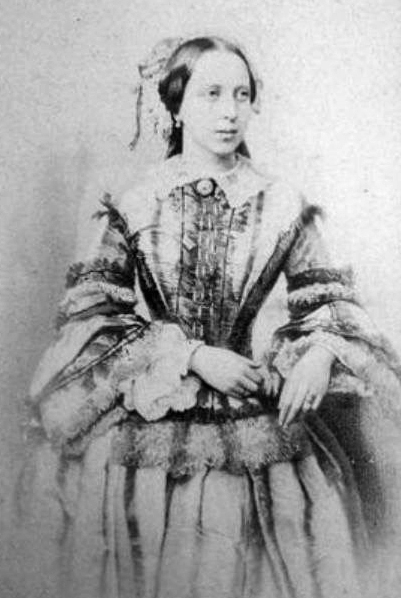
Grand Duchess Alexandra Petrovna in her youth.

Duke Peter, Alexandra's father, was the only surviving son of Grand Duchess Catherine Pavlovna, the fourth daughter of Tsar Paul I of Russia. Peter of Oldenburg followed a military career in the Imperial Russian Army and was also a scholar, a music composer and philanthropist. Alexandra's mother, Princess Therese of Nassau-Weilburg, was interested in painting and like her husband was deeply involved in charity work, so much so that she was considered an eccentric. The couple had a happy marriage, preferring a quiet family life rather than court life. They were devoted parents to their eight children, providing a careful education for them.

The family spent the winter months in Peterhof and moved for the summer to their other residence Kamenoi-Ostroff. There, Alexandra and her siblings had a children's farm where they grew vegetables and tended farm animals under the supervision of their Russian governess.

Alexandra and her siblings grew up surrounded by art and music. She learned Russian, German, English and French. Besides the usual school subjects, the children had to practice music, painting, dancing, riding and palace etiquette. Alexandra excelled at the arts and she was also interested in literature, Russian history and genealogy. Alexandra's education awoke in her an interest in medicine and in solving social problems of the poor.

In 1848, Alexandra's parents took her and her younger brother, Nicholas, to visit their relatives in Germany. They stayed with Alexandra's maternal family in Wiesbaden and Alexandra's paternal relatives in Oldenburg.

== Marriage ==
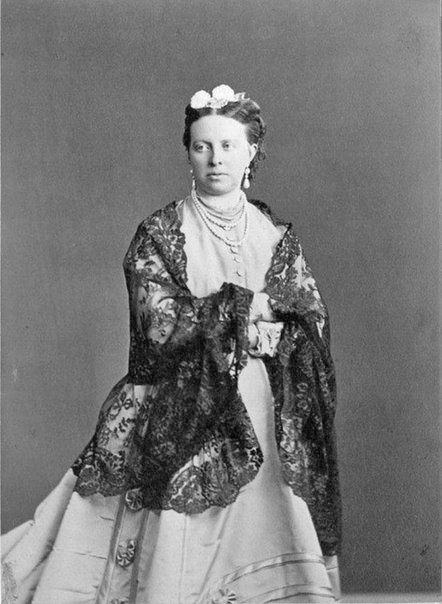
Grand Duchess Alexandra Petrovna. Princess Alexandra of Oldenburg. Early 1860s.

After Alexandra made her debut at court with a series of dinners and receptions, her parents arranged a high-status marriage for her. During a family dinner at the Anichkov Palace, Grand Duke Nicholas Nikolaevich, the third son of Tsar Nicholas I and her first cousin once removed, proposed and she accepted to marry him. The engagement was announced publicly that same day, 25 October 1855.

Seven years Alexandra's senior, Grand Duke Nicholas was a military officer who had numerous love affairs. The Russian Imperial family, in an attempt to control the Grand Duke's excesses, had propelled Nicholas to marry Alexandra, hoping that she would have a good influence on him. Alexandra, who had been raised in the Lutheran church, converted to the Orthodox faith on 7 January 1856, and was styled as: HIH Alexandra Petrovna, Grand Duchess of Russia. The wedding took place on 6 February [O.S. 25 January] 1856 at Peterhof Palace and it was followed by a dinner ball at the Nicholas Hall of the Winter Palace.

Alexandra was described by Anna Tyutcheva (1829-1889), a lady in waiting to Empress Maria Alexandrovna, as: "... a sweet and docile creature ... Although not beautiful, she is captivating with the freshness of her seventeen years of age, and also with the sincerity and kindness that shines on her face". Tyutcheva later commented about Alexandra: "her complexion is, in fact, the only thing that's good about her. Her facial features are rather plain and quite irregular".

As the young couple's own residence, the Nicholas Palace, was still under construction, Alexandra and Nicholas spent the first five years of their marriage in the Winter Palace. There, in their apartments on the ground floor, nine months after their wedding, Alexandra gave birth to their first child on 18 November 1856, Grand Duke Nicholas Nikolaevich of Russia the Younger.

== Charity work ==
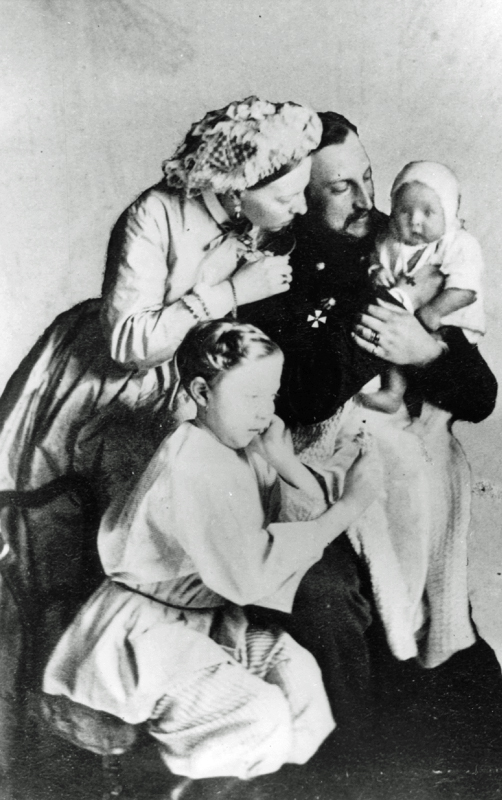
Grand Duke Nicholas Nikolaevich his wife Grand Duchess Alexandra Petrovna of Russia and their two sons.1864.

Alexandra loved her husband and her son deeply but she felt it was also her duty to help those in need. She embraced wholeheartedly charitable work, spending her allowance on donations to schools, hospitals and other institutions. Plain and unsophisticated, Alexandra liked simplicity and preferred to dress modestly, avoiding public life. She dedicated her time to religion and to her consuming interest in medicine. Alexandra's pleasant manners made her win many sympathies. She was well-liked by her two sisters-in-law Maria Alexandrovna and Alexandra Iosifovna. However, at the Russian court, Alexandra Petrovna's involvement in philanthropy was considered excessive and she was regarded as a holy fool.

In December 1861, the couple moved to their newly built Nicholas Palace on Annunciation Square. There, Alexandra used her White Lounge to stage charity bazaars and art exhibitions to raise money for orphans. In 1863, a church was added to her palace under the care of Alexandra's confessor, Archpriest Vasili Lebedev, who had great influence over the deeply devoted grand duchess.

Lacking in beauty and social graces, Alexandra avoided court functions, instead of dividing her time between her charitable activities and farm work on the family's summer residence, Znamenka Palace, near Peterhof, which had been given to them as a wedding present. During the summer months at Znamenka, Nicholas and Alexandra entertained guests there. Grand Duchess Alexandra was also a gifted artist. She adorned the walls of Znamenka with her paintings. Even in the country, Alexandra continued her charity work. She started a first aid station from where she received patients, offered treatment and visited them at home.

On 10 January 1864, Alexandra gave birth to her last child, Grand Duke Peter Nikolaevich of Russia. The following year, Alexandra became chairwoman of the board of trustees of the office of Empress Maria Alexandrovna which oversaw orphanages, founding homes, schools and hospitals. The area of medicine and nursing had a particular appeal to Alexandra, and sometimes she nursed the patients herself. In 1865, Alexandra founded a training institute for nurses in St Petersburg, the Pokrov of our lady commune. In spite of the differences in character and outlook, Alexandra and her husband lived in harmony for the first ten years of their married life. Initially, Grand Duke Nicholas respected and admired his wife's interest in charities and medicine as well as her being extremely religious. He financed a hospital in the city where her theories could be developed and put into practice and poor patients received care without charge.

== The end of married life ==
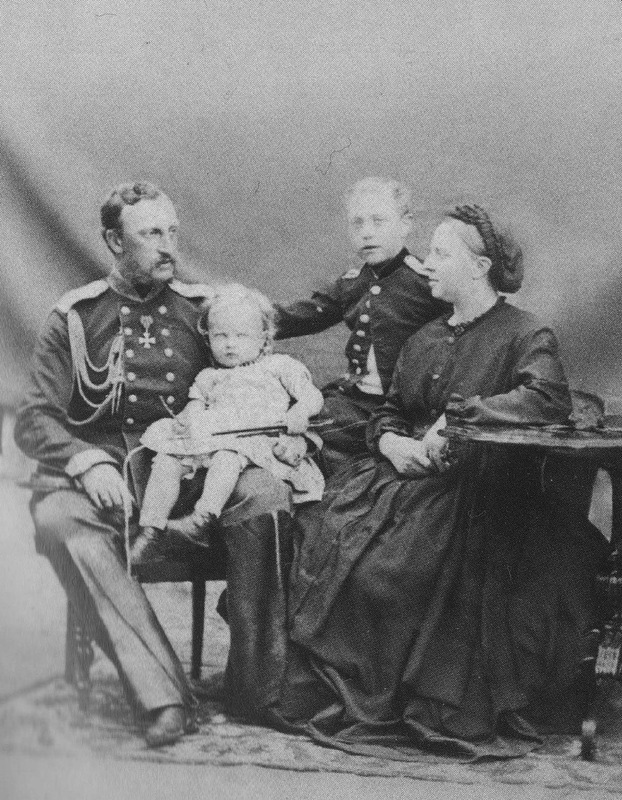
Grand Duke Nicholas Nikolaevich, his wife Grand Duchess Alexandra Petrovna, and their two sons.1865.

As time went by, Grand Duke Nicholas Nicholaievich grew tired of Alexandra's increasing preoccupation with religion and began complaining of his wife's lack of glamour and distaste for society. In 1865, the grand duke started a permanent relationship with Catherine Chislova, a dancer from the Krasnoye Selo Theater. Nicholas Nicholaievich did not attempt to hide his affair. He installed his mistress in a house visible from the study of his palace in St Petersburg. In 1868, Catherine Chislova gave birth to the first of the couple's five illegitimate children. According to some sources, Alexandra Petrovna retaliated against her husband's infidelity by taking a lover and, in 1868, gave birth to an illegitimate son. However, no sound information has surfaced to corroborate these claims. The story of the illegitimate child seems unlikely.

Alexandra Petrovna was deeply upset by her husband's infidelity. She was torn between her duties, the breaking up of her marriage and the death of her sister Catherine Petrovna in 1866. By 1870, nothing was left of her marriage except the bitterness. Alexandra found solace in her two sons and her charity work while her husband divided his time between his children with Alexandra and his second family. The couple's palace in St. Petersburg was so large that they did not have to see each other. Nicholas and Alexandra led separate lives, appearing together only in official ceremonies.

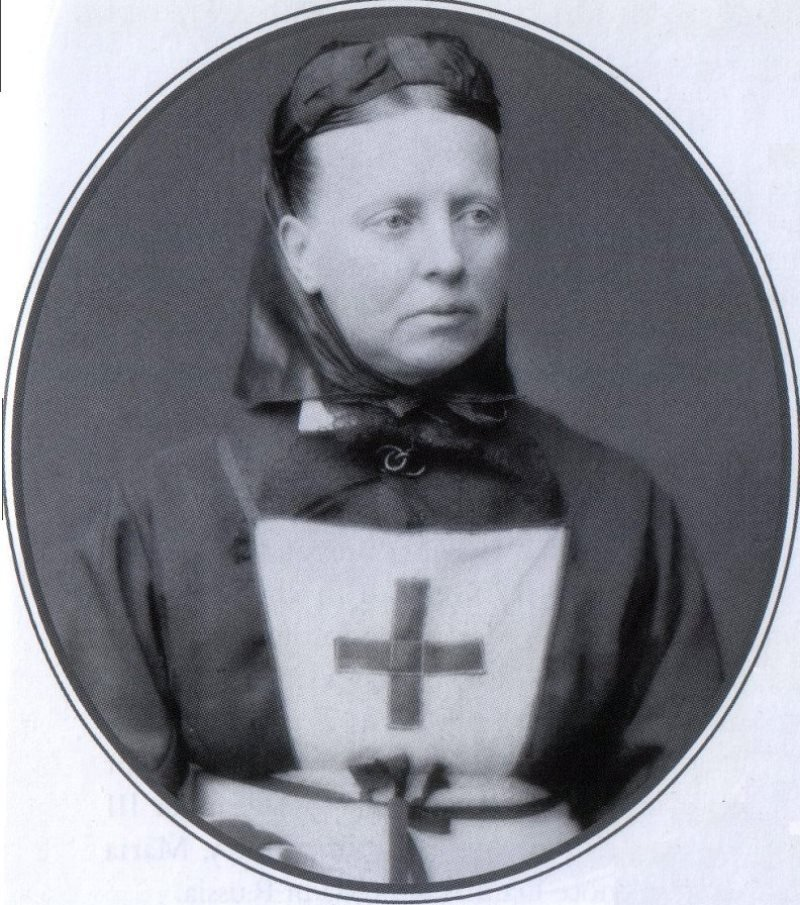
Grand Duchess Alexandra Petrovna of Russia in her nurse uniform. 1870s

When the Grand Duke arranged a change of class into the gentry for his mistress and the couple's illegitimate children, Alexandra Petrovna appealed to Alexander II to intervene, but she found her brother-in-law less than sympathetic. "You see," he bluntly told her, "your husband is in the prime of his life, and he needs a woman with whom he can be in love. And look at yourself! See even how you dress! No man would be attracted". After this encounter, however, Alexander did advise his brother to be more discreet and exiled Catherine Chislova to Wenden, near Riga in 1875. Grand Duke Nicholas managed to have Chislova returned and had her installed with their illegitimate children in the Crimea. During the Russian-Turkish War, 1877–1878, Grand Duke Nicholas Nikolaievich commanded the Russian army of the Danube while Alexandra organized a sanitary unit at her own expense. After the end of the war, Grand Duke Nicholas spent most of his time in Crimea with his mistress while Grand Duchess Alexandra continued to live at their St Peterburg palace.

In 1879, determined to get rid of his wife, Grand Duke Nicholas expelled Alexandra from the Nicholas Palace, publicly accusing her of infidelity with her confessor, Vasily Lebedev. Grand Duchess Alexandra, leaving behind her jewelry, clothes and possessions, had to move to her parents' house. The same year, Alexandra suffered a carriage accident which left her almost completely paralyzed. She could move neither her legs nor her right arm. Alexandra asked her brother-in-law, Tsar Alexander II, for help. Appalled by the scandal, Alexander II was not sympathetic towards Alexandra and instead made her leave Russia indefinitely to seek medical treatment abroad. Alexander II himself paid for the trip expenses.

== Sister Anastasia ==
In November 1880, the Grand Duchess left for Italy with her two sons on board the naval steamer Eriklik. She was hoping to find relief for her ailments in the mild climate of Naples. Her godson Grand Duke Sergei Alexandrovich and his brother Grand Duke Paul, who were on an Italian tour, visited her for two days. In January 1881, her estranged husband, Grand Duke Nicholas, arrived unexpectedly and took both their sons with him. According to Alexandra: he "made me experience things I wouldn't wish on my worst enemy". Alexandra left Naples in early 1881 and sailed to Northern Greece. With the assassination of Tsar Alexander II in March 1881, Alexandra asked for help from her nephew Alexander III, who was sympathetic towards her, unlike his father. Alexander III disliked his uncle Nicholas and removed him from all his posts. Alexander also lifted Alexandra's exile, allowing her to return to Russia.

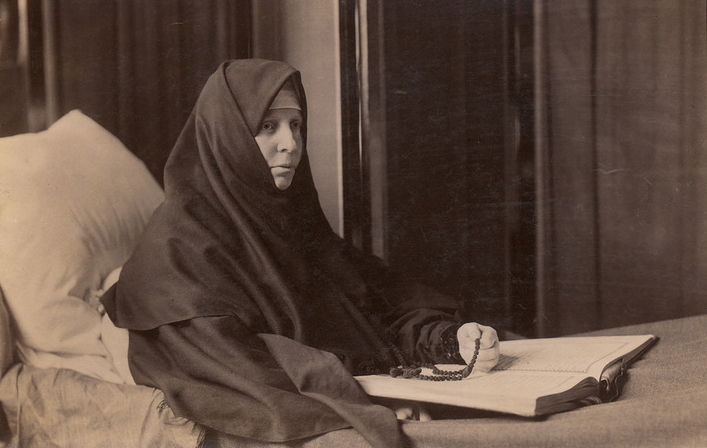
Grand Duchess Alexandra Petrovna of Russia, 1880s

Alexandra started a new life in Kiev. Initially, she settled at the Mariinskyi Palace, the Emperor's residence in Kiev, in the hope that she could recover. She completely relied on religion for solace and comfort. Reliant on a wheelchair, the Grand Duchess decided to stay in Kiev for good. This was convenient for her husband, who wanted to divorce her so he could marry his mistress. Alexandra vehemently refused to grant a divorce and Nicholas hoped that he could be a widower so he could remarry, as it had been the case of his brother Alexander II, who after his wife's death married his mistress. Alexandra, in spite of her poor health, outlived both her husband and her husband's mistress.

In Kiev, Alexandra's health did not improve for years. In 1888, she bought a plot of land near Voznessenskaya Hill. There, with the permission of Metropolitan Platon of Kiev and investing her own money, she founded the Pokrovsky Nunnery, a convent of nursing nuns with its own hospitals, asylums and dispensary to provide free treatment for the poor. In the summer of 1889, she recovered the mobility of her legs. She bandaged them tightly to relieve the pain.

Alexandra became a nun, as Sister Anastasia, taking Holy Orders on 3 November 1889 in Kiev, while her husband was still alive. For the rest of her life, she worked at the hospital performing nursing duties, helping contagious patents and cleaning infected wounds. She often assisted in surgeries.

== Last years ==
Saint Anastasia of Kiev
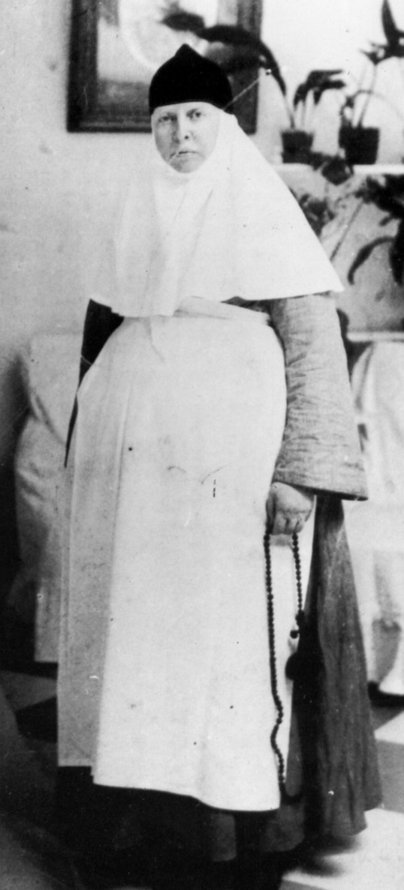
- Sister Anastasia, formerly Grand Duchess Alexandra

Venerable, Grand Duchess
- Venerated in: Ukrainian Orthodox Church
- Canonized: 24 November 2009 by the Holy Synod of the Ukrainian Orthodox Church
- Major shrine: Pokrovsky Nunnery
- Feast: Bright Thursday; 13 April; 20 October (Note: Both feast days falling 13 days later on the Julian Calendar) (Uncovering of Relics)
- Attributes: Nun's habit
- Patronage: Divorced Men and Women

Catherine Chislova died in 1889, and Grand Duke Nicholas survived his lover by only two years. When he died in the Crimea in 1891, Alexandra Petrovna did not attend the funeral. She also refused to pay homage to her dead husband when the funeral catafalque, taking his body for burial in the St Peter and St Paul Cathedral in St Petersburg, came by train via Kiev on its route from the south.

Alexandra's own health was poor. In May 1892, she underwent a successful breast cancer operation and spent some time in Corfu while she recuperated, returning to work in February 1893. The Grand Duchess remained close to her sons, who had taken her side in the family breakup. She was in the Crimea in 1898 when her daughter-in-law, Grand Duchess Militsa, gave birth to twin daughters, one of whom died shortly after birth. Alexandra took her granddaughter's remains with her and buried the coffin in the convent cemetery in Kiev.

Alexandra Petrovna died at Kievo Pechersky Monastery in Kiev on 25 April [O.S. 12 April] 1900, when she was 61. She had stomach cancer. She was buried within the monastery graveyard in a plain white coffin, wearing her monastic habit. On the day of her burial, Emperor Nicholas II and Empress Alexandra Feodorovna attended a memorial service held in the Moscow Kremlin palace church.

In the 1950s, Alexandra's remains were moved to the Lukianovskoe Cemetery. She was reburied in the garden at the St. Nicholas Cathedral of the Pokrov Monastery on 2 November 2009. Grand Duchess Alexandra Petrovna was canonized by the Holy Synod of the Ukrainian Orthodox Church on 24 November 2009 as the locally venerated Reverend Grand Duchess Anastasia of Kiev, patron saint of all divorced men and women. Today her grave in the convent garden is again tended by nuns and her works continues.

== Ancestry ==
Ancestors of Duchess Alexandra of Oldenburg

8. Peter I, Grand Duke of Oldenburg
4. Duke George of Oldenburg
9. Frederica of Württemberg
2. Duke Peter of Oldenburg
10. Paul I of Russia
5. Catherine Pavlovna of Russia
11. Sophie Dorothea of Württemberg
1. Duchess Alexandra of Oldenburg
12. Frederick William, Prince of Nassau-Weilburg
6. William, Duke of Nassau
13. Burgravine Louise Isabelle of Kirchberg
3. Princess Therese of Nassau-Weilburg
14. Frederick, Duke of Saxe-Altenburg
7. Princess Louise of Saxe-Hildburghausen
15. Duchess Charlotte Georgine of Mecklenburg-Strelitz

== Bibliography ==
- "Александра Петровна" . Brockhaus and Efron Encyclopedic Dictionary (in Russian). 1906.
- Belyakova, Zoia, The Romanov Legacy : The Palaces of St. Petersburg, Hazar Publishing, 1994, ISBN 1-874371-27-X.
- Galaktionova, Irene W. A Life of Servitude: Grand Duchess Alexandra Petrovna. Royal Russia. N 5, 2014. ISBN 978-1-927604-06-9.
- McIntosh, David. The Russian Oldenburgs, in Royalty History Digest.
- Zeepvat, Charlotte. Patriots and just Men, in Royalty History Digest.
- Zeepvat, Charlotte. Djulber, in Royalty History Digest. September 1999. N 9, Volume IX, N 3.
- Zeepvat, Charlotte. The Camera and the Tsars. Sutton Publishing, 2004, ISBN 0-7509-3049-7.
