= Grand Duke Nicholas Nikolaevich of Russia =

Grand Duke Nicholas Nikolaevich of Russia may refer to:

- Grand Duke Nicholas Nikolaevich of Russia (1831–1891), third son and sixth child of Tsar Nicholas I of Russia and Charlotte of Prussia
- Grand Duke Nicholas Nikolaevich of Russia (1856–1929), his son
