= Pokrovsky Nunnery =

Nunnery in Kyiv, Ukraine

- Покровський жіночий монастир
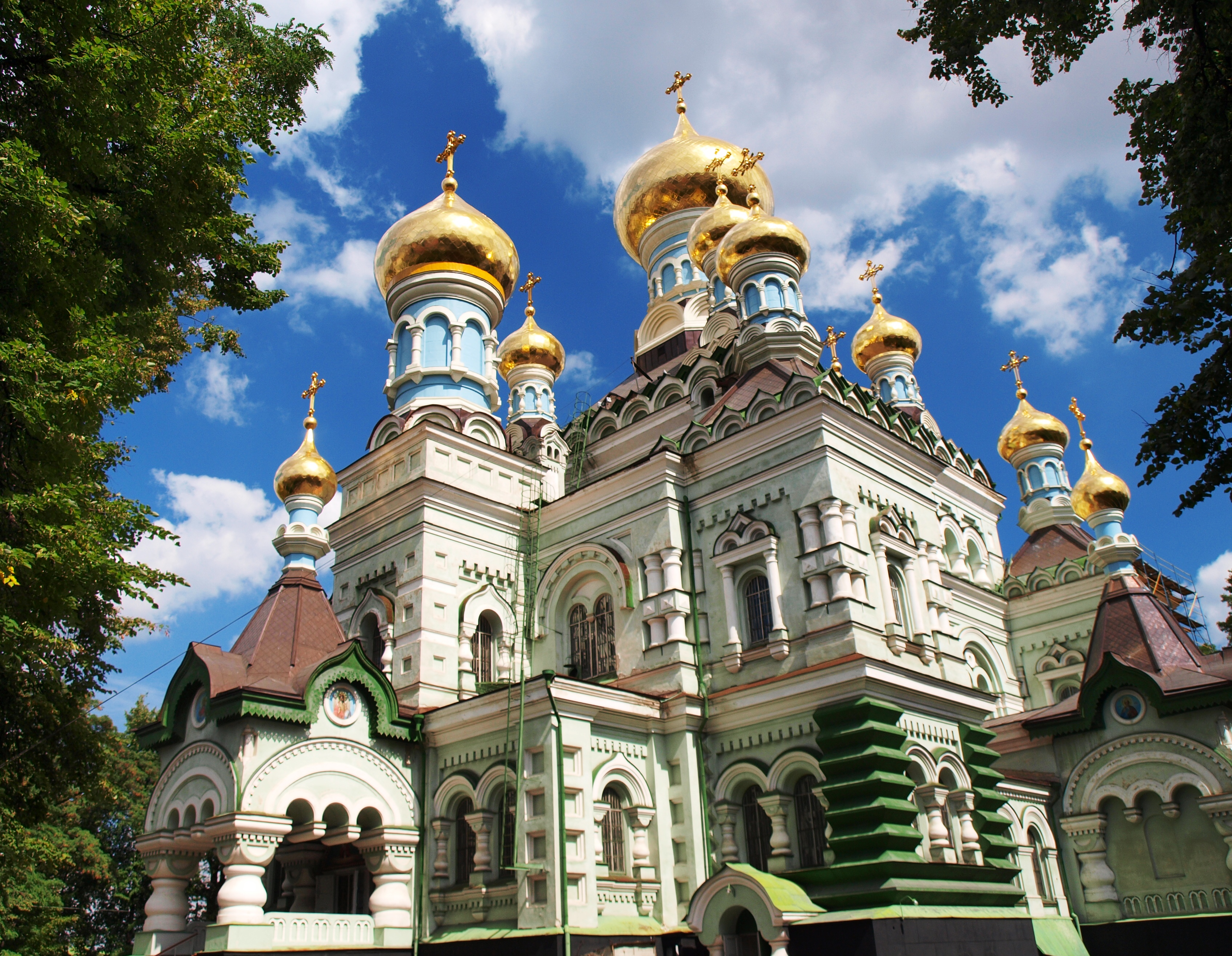

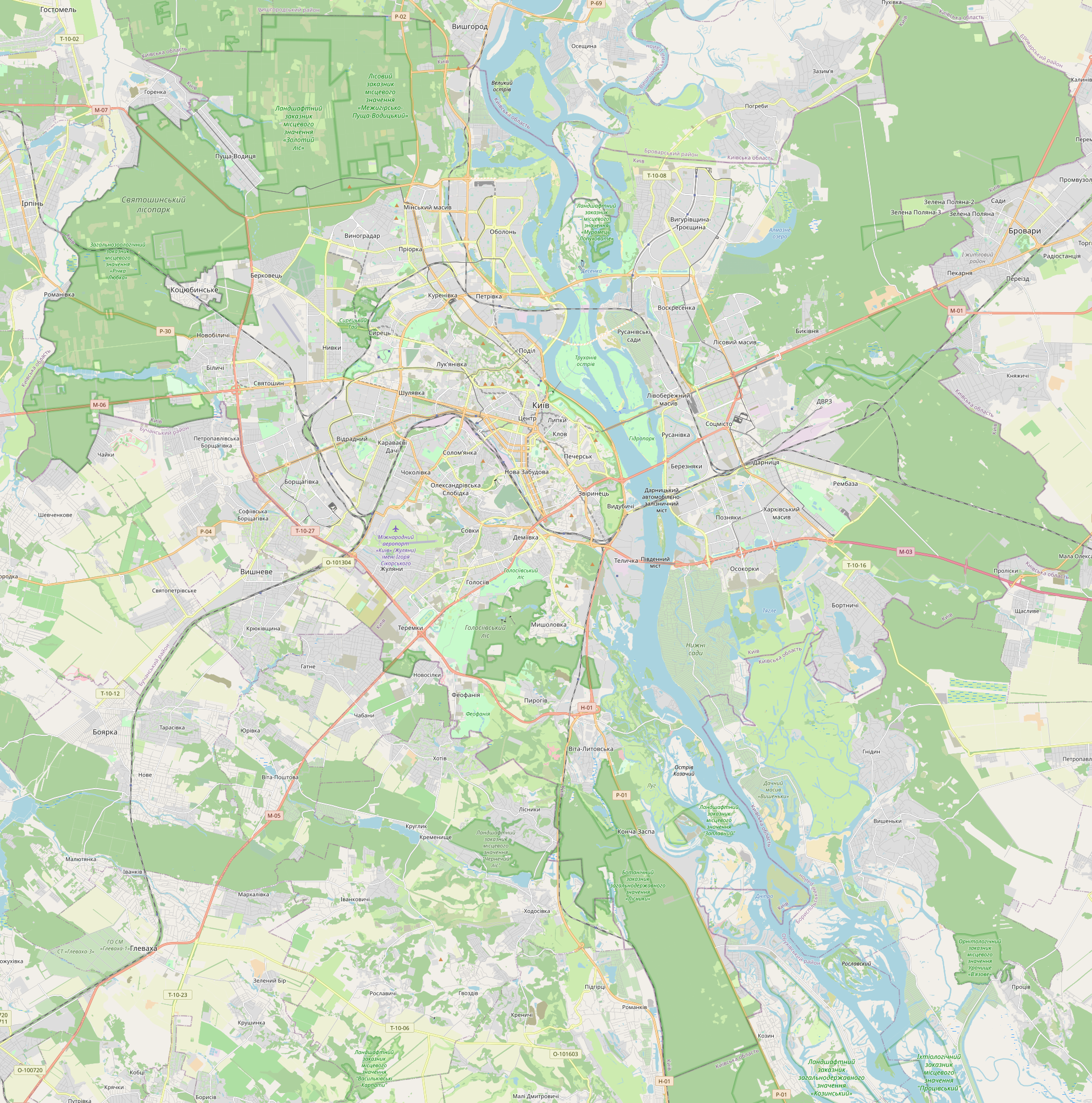
- Location within Ukraine Kyiv Location within Ukraine

Monastery information
- Denomination: Ukrainian Orthodox Church (Moscow Patriarchate)
- Established: 1889
- Diocese: Kyiv
- Controlled churches: Cathedral of Saint Nicholas

Site
- Location: Kyiv
- Country: Ukraine
- Coordinates: 50.4590°N 30.4937°E

The Pokrovsky Nunnery (Ukrainian: Покровський жіночий монастир, romanized: Pokrovskyi zhinochyi monastyr) in Kyiv, Ukraine, known in full as the Nunnery of the Protection of the Mother of God, is a religious complex, including the Cathedral of St. Nicholas, under the control of the Kyiv Eparchy of the Ukrainian Orthodox Church of the Moscow Patriarchate. "Pokrovsky" can be translated as Intercession.

The nunnery was founded in 1889 and developed in the last decade of the 19th century by the Grand Duchess Alexandra of Russia (1838–1900), the estranged wife and later widow of Grand Duke Nicholas Nikolaevich.

== History ==
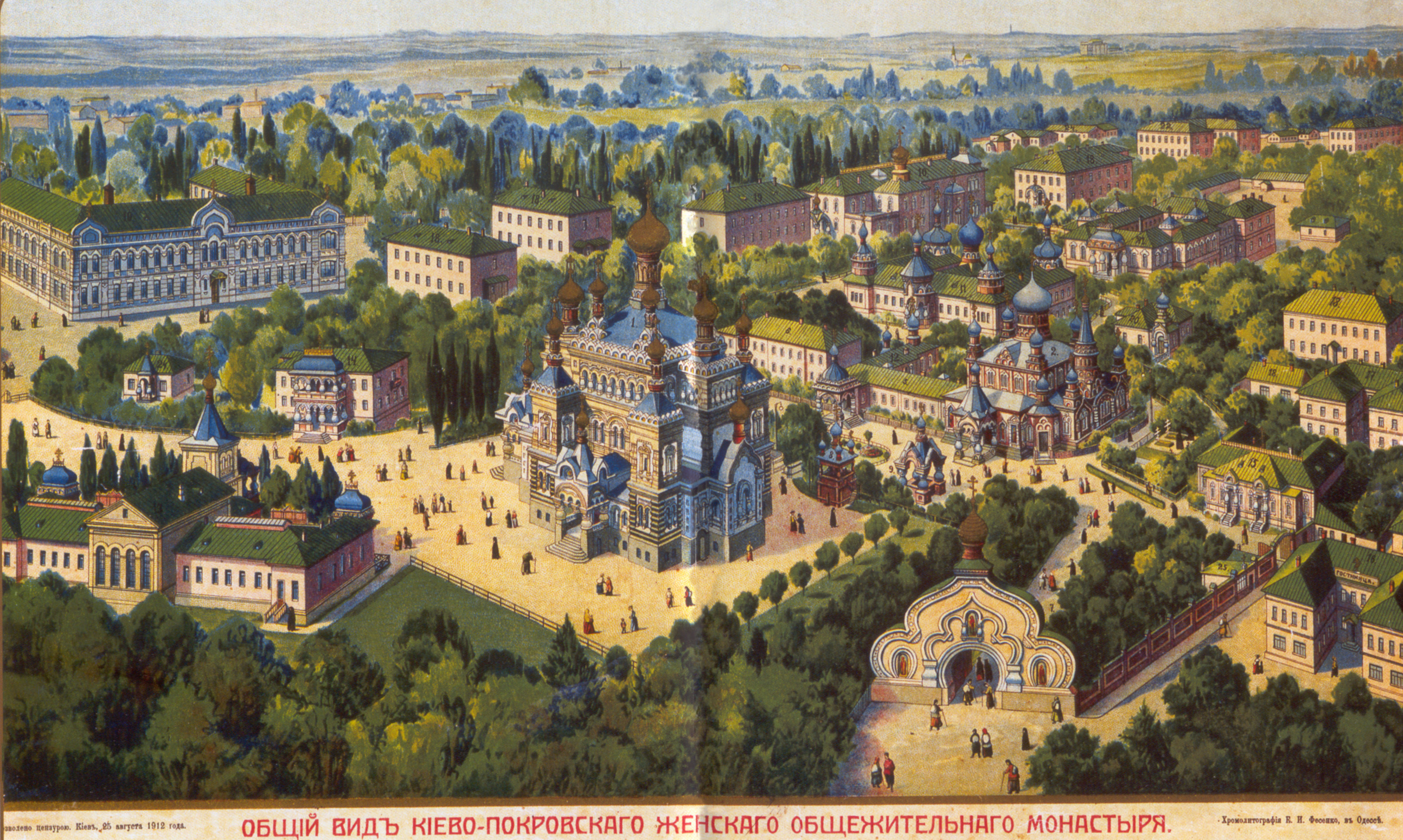
Pokrovsky Nunnery, 1912

Brought up as a Lutheran, the Grand Duchess Alexandra converted to the Orthodox faith on her marriage in 1856. About 1881, after her marriage had broken down, she settled in Kiev at the Mariinskyi Palace. In 1888, she bought a plot of land near Voznessenskaya Hill, and there, with permission from Metropolitan Platon of Kiev, she founded a nunnery. The building of the nunnery began in 1889, paid for out of Alexandra's own fortune. In 1892, Alexandra secretly took perpetual monastic vows before a monk who came from Mount Athos, under the name of Anastasia. Although she lived from then on by the Studian monastic rule, her religious vows did not come to light until after her death.

The complex came to include a residential convent, with guest rooms, a church, a hospital with another church, an outpatient clinic, and a pharmacy, a parish school for girls, and shelters for the sick and for poor children and orphans. The nunnery's hospital soon achieved a high standard of medical care and owned the first X-ray machine in Kiev. The Grand Duchess sold her valuables to raise funds for expansion, and the complex continued to develop throughout the 1890s. In 1896, a significant new church, dedicated to Saint Nicholas, designed by Valentin Nikolaev, was begun. Tsar Nicholas II founded a new hospital for five hundred patients on the site. In 1897, there was a typhus epidemic in Kiev, and Grand Duchess Alexandra established another hospital, where she herself helped to nurse patients. Three years later, she died and was buried in the nunnery, according to her wishes.

After the death of its founder, the nunnery remained under the care of the Tsar and his family. The state paid 80,000 roubles a year for the costs of the hospitals. Between 1910 and 1911, a new surgical hospital was built. In 1911, the fifteen-domed Cathedral of St Nicholas was consecrated, with the church of the Icon of the Mother of God within it. However, the cathedral was not completed, as the outbreak of the First World War in 1914 prevented the planned decorations from being provided inside it.

In 1919, two years after the October Revolution, the Soviet government nationalized the property of the nuns, who continued to live in the community for four more years, registering it as a workers' cooperative. In 1923, the monastery came under the control of the clergy of the Living Church, who forced the superior of the monastery, Ihumenia Zofia, to resign; the Pokrovsky nunnery was liquidated and turned into workers' apartments. The churches, without their domes, were used to house a nursery, a printing house, and a book shop. Ihumenia Zofia went with about twenty sisters to Irpin, where she established a secret monastic community..The Pokrovsky nunnery was reinstated and nuns returned to it after the occupation of Kiev by the Germans in 1941. The nuns had an outpatient clinic, and its doctors issued many false certificates of diseases to save local people from deportation to forced labour.

The nuns were allowed to remain and to continue their hospitals, including a military hospital, after Kiev was taken back by the Red Army. After the war, the nuns remained, but they were allowed to use only parts of their former property, in which some of their possessions were nationalized. They renovated the convent and the two churches.

The cathedral was badly damaged by a lightning strike in 1981, but the renovation works which followed included the first ever interior decoration of the cathedral.

After 1991, on the site of the wooden Orthodox Church of the Protection of the Mother of God, a church of the same name was built of brick and consecrated in 1999.

In 2007, the lost domes of the Cathedral of St Nicholas were rebuilt.

== Gallery ==
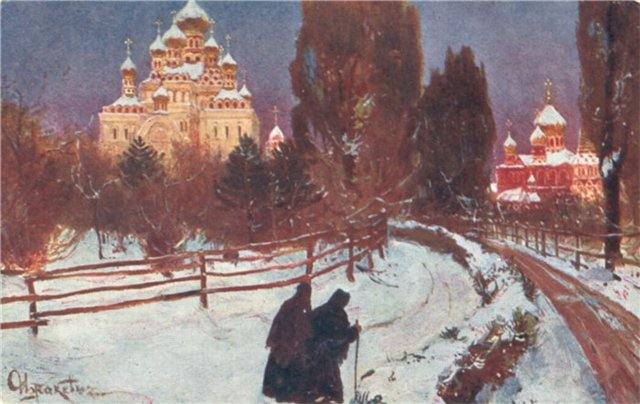
The Nunnery painted by Ivan Izhakevich, 1910

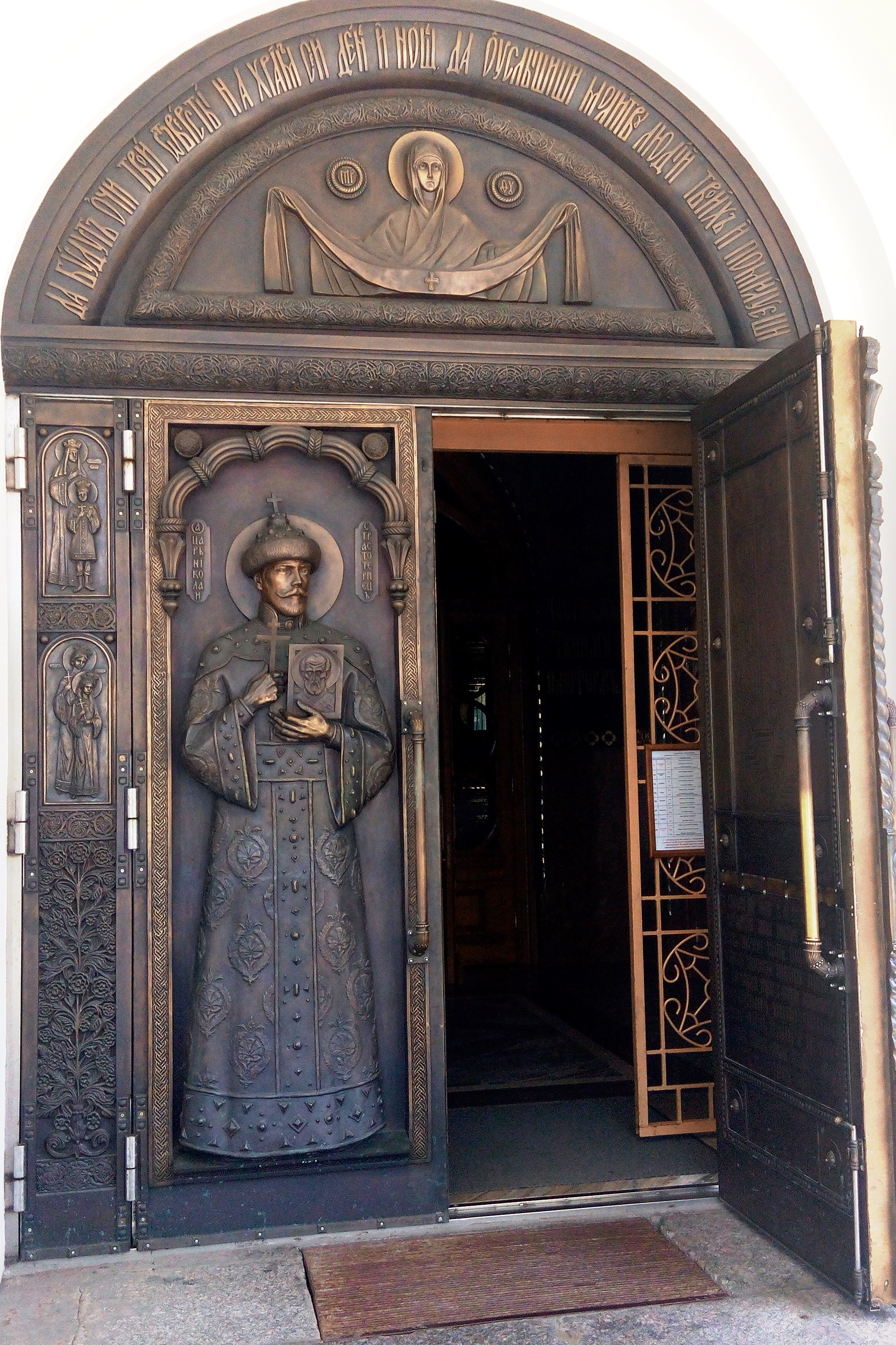
Doors of the cathedral

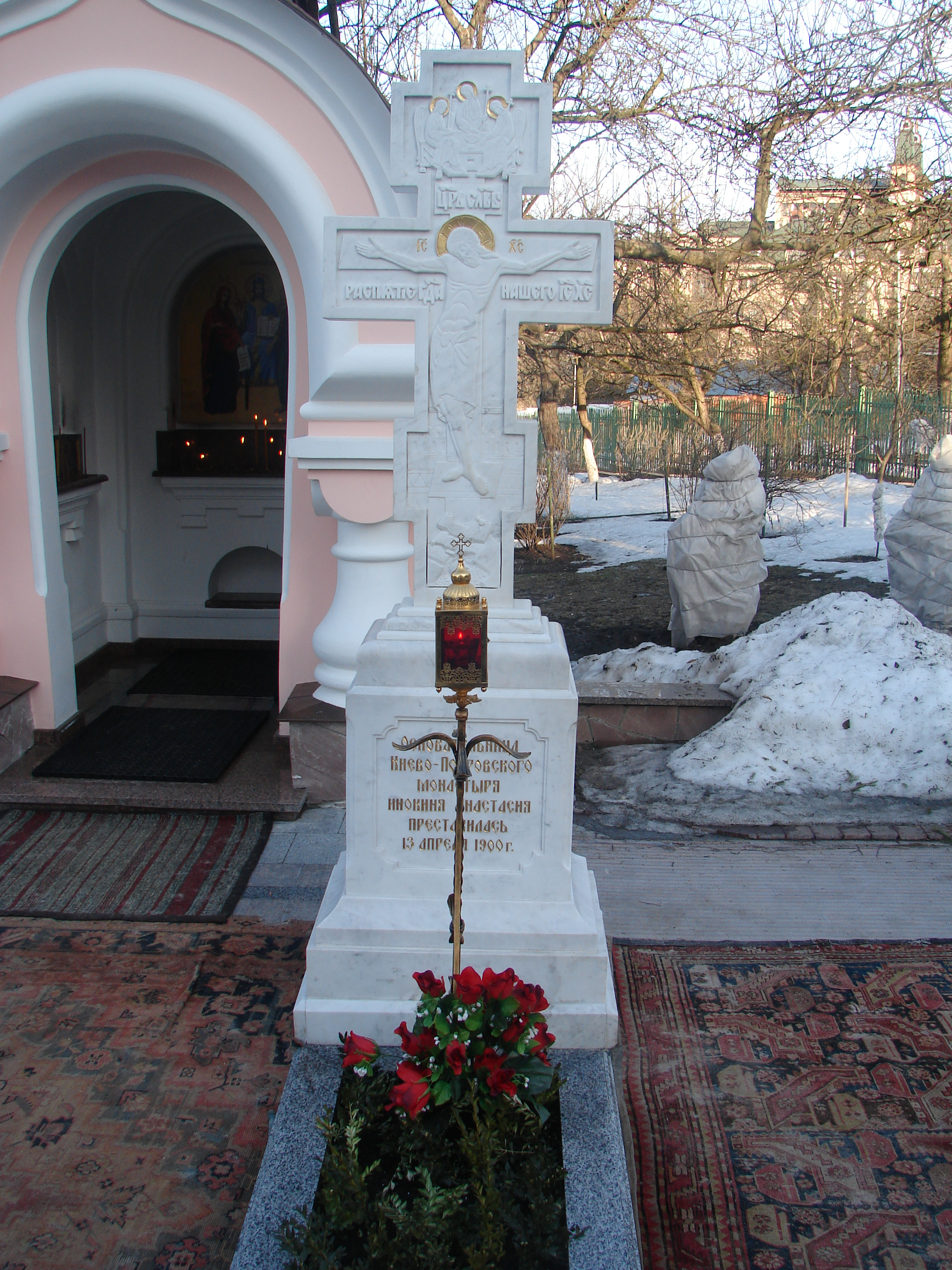
Tomb of Grand Duchess Alexandra, Sister Anastasia

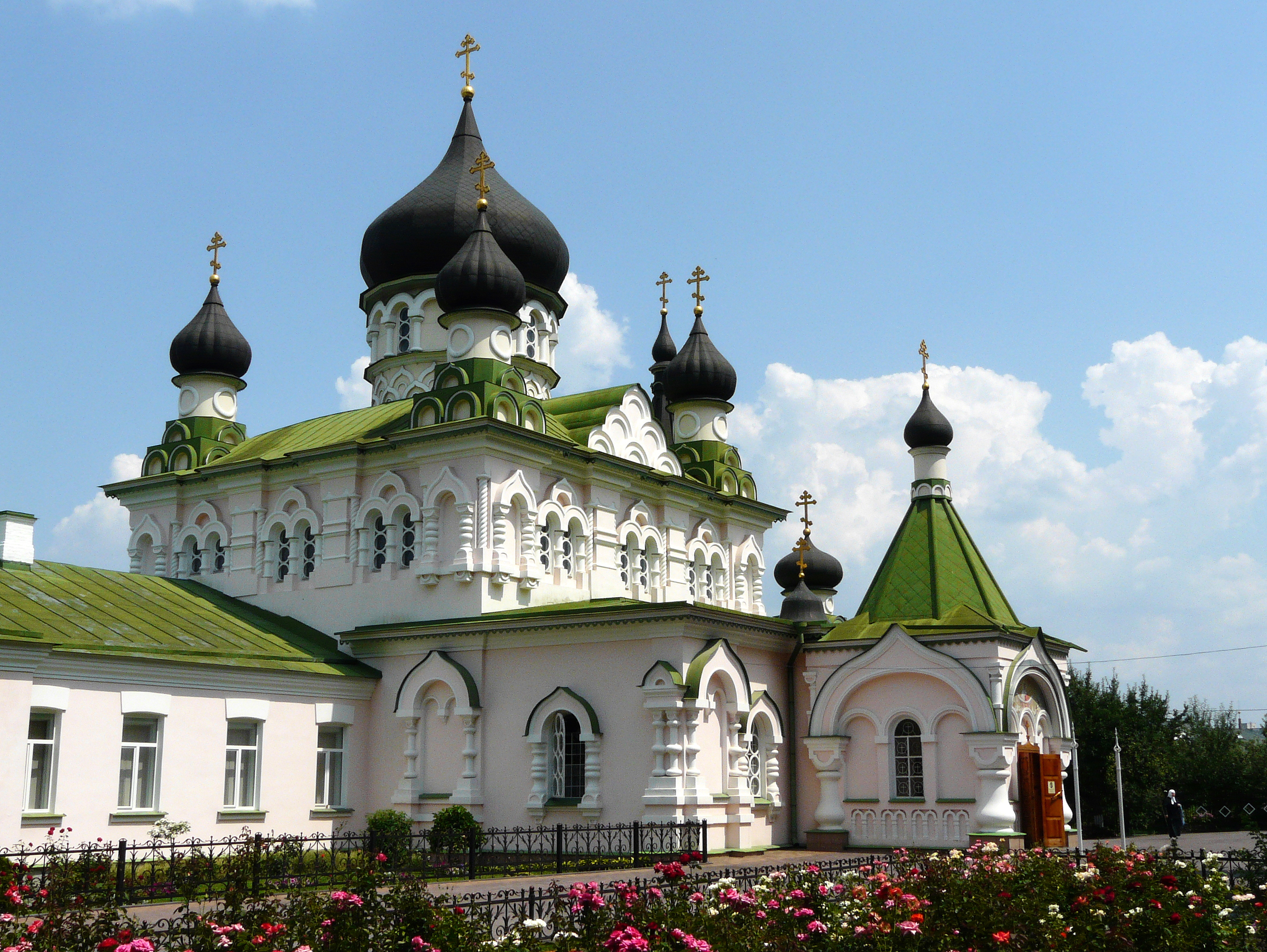
Church of the Protection of the Mother of God

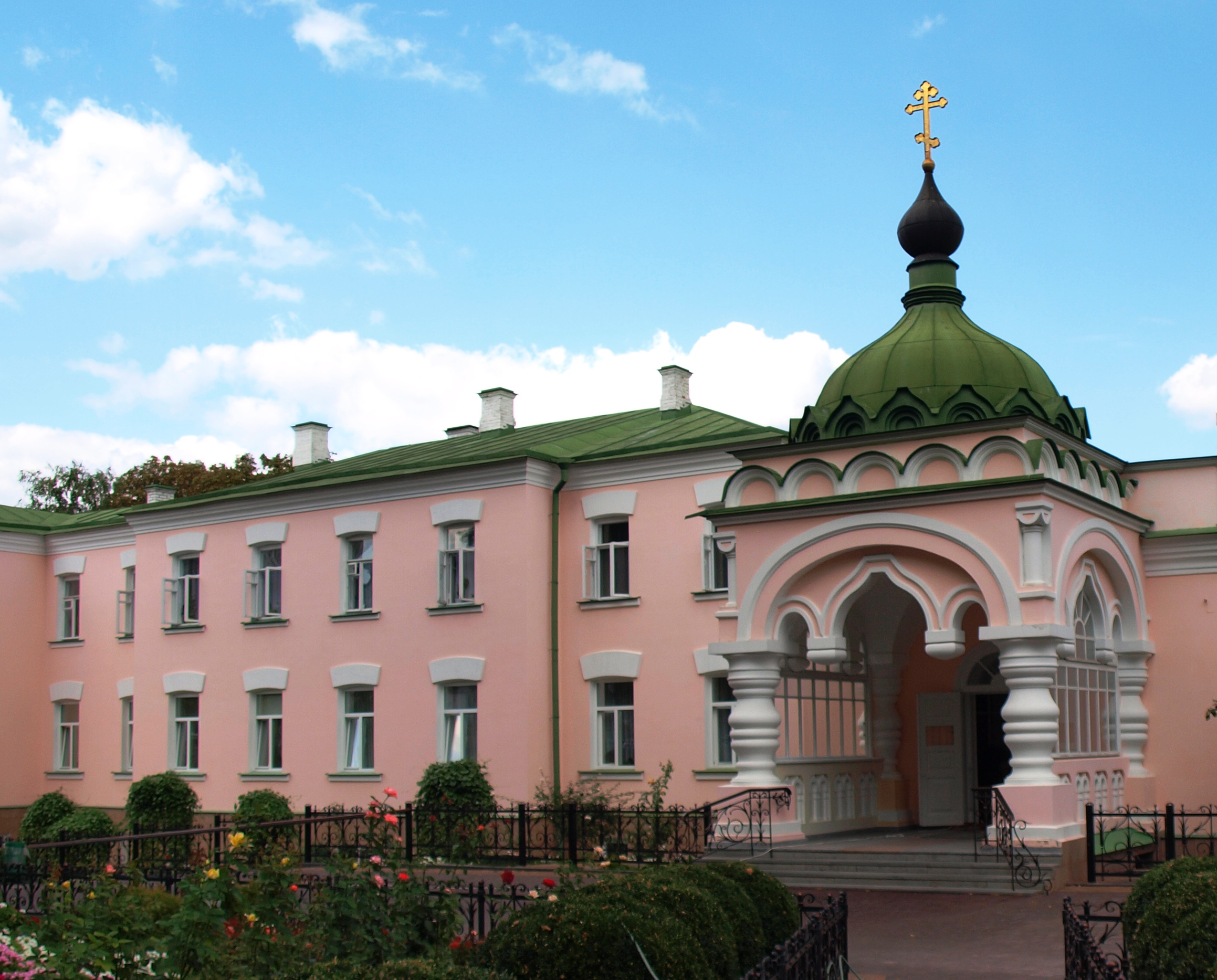
Convent

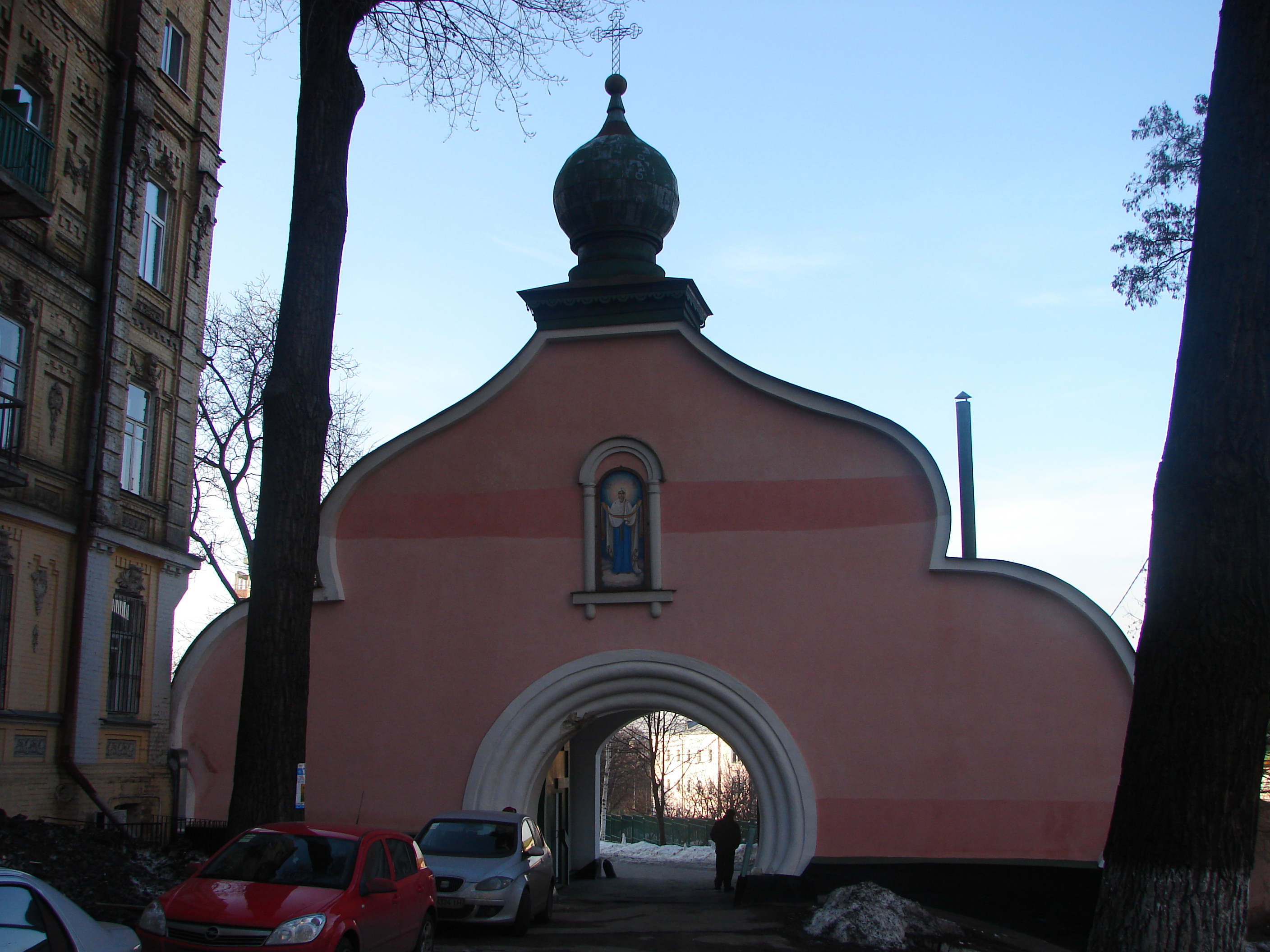
Entrance gate

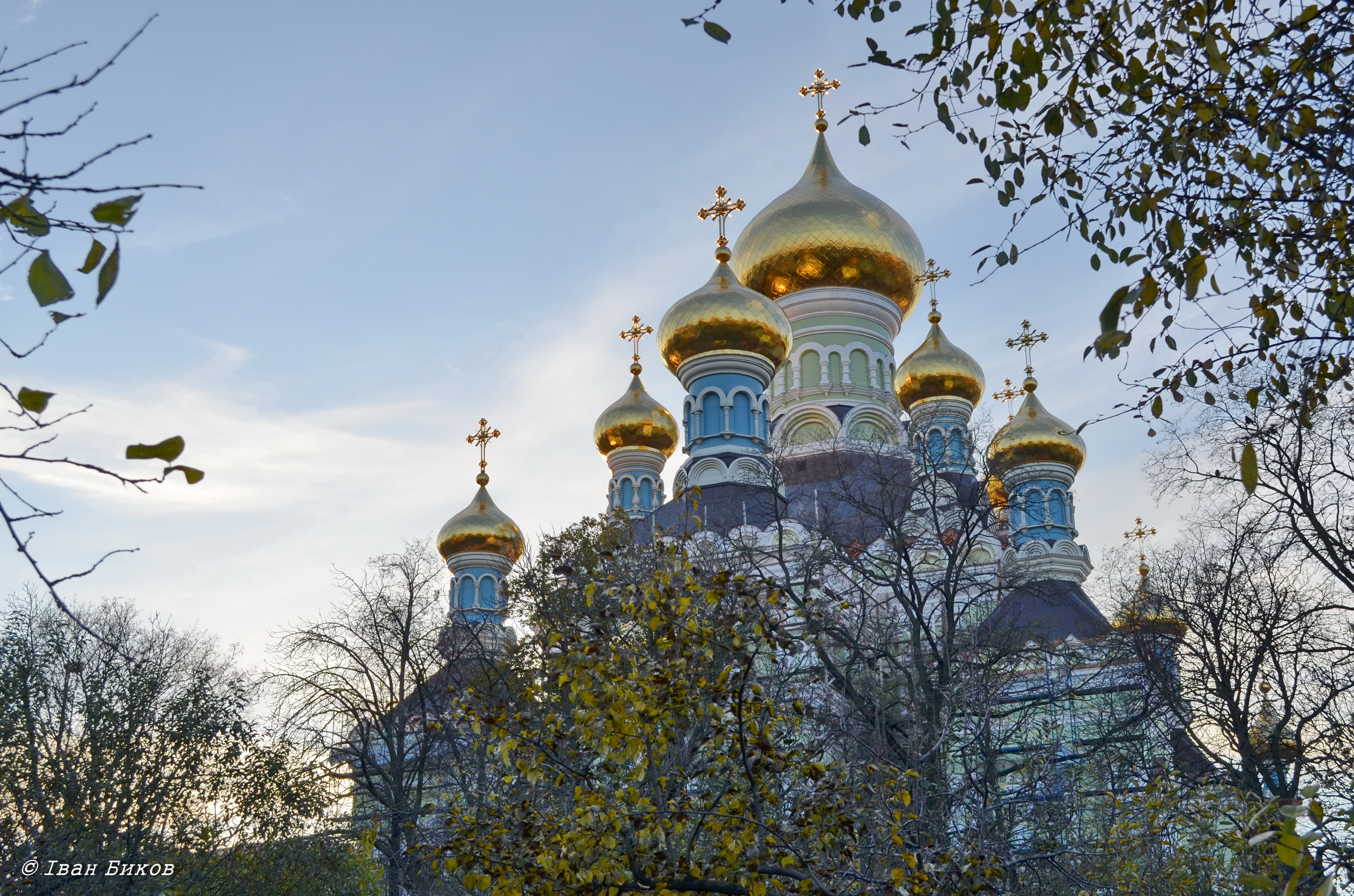
Domes of the cathedral

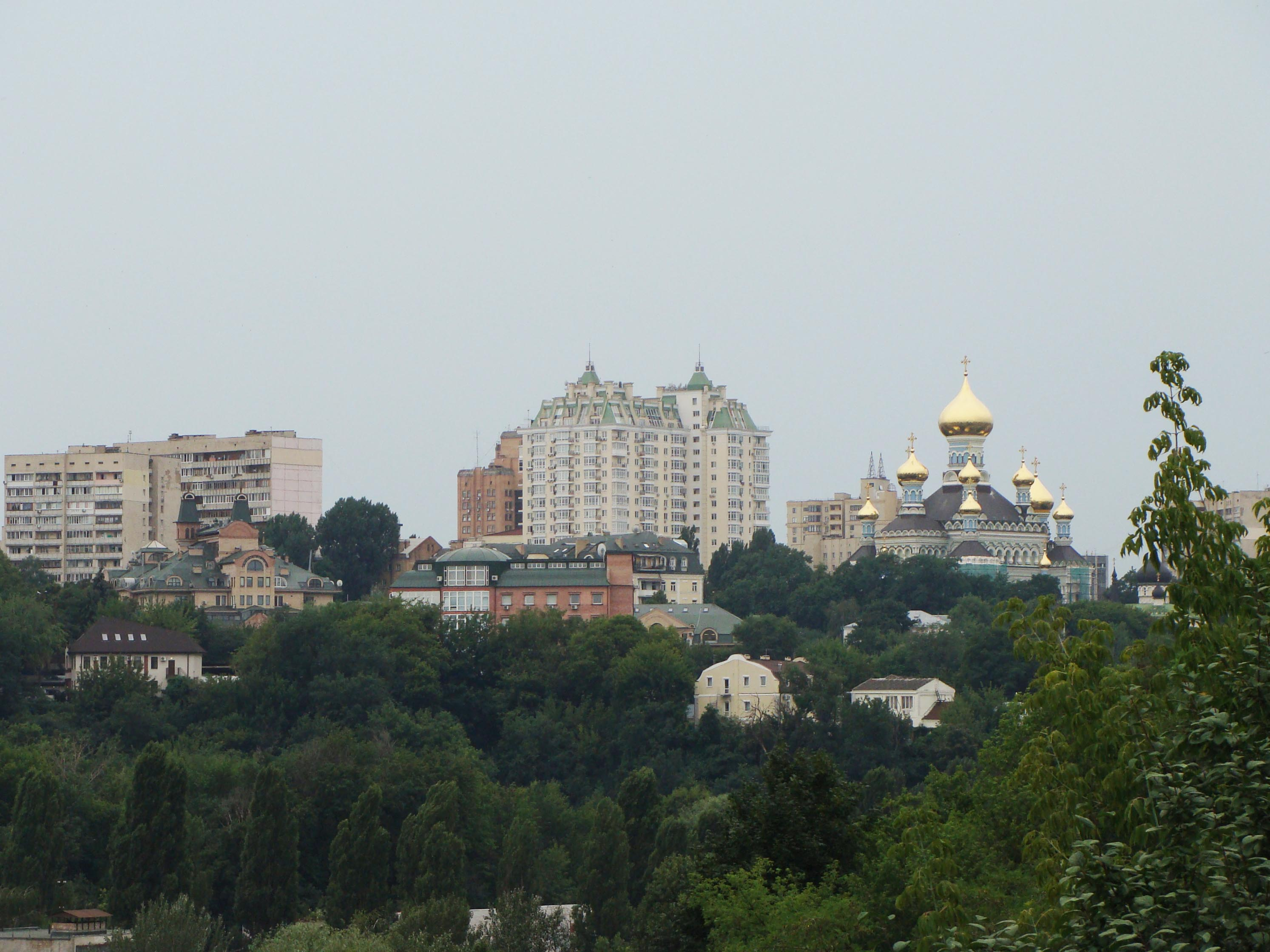
View of the complex in 2011
