= Catherine Chislova =

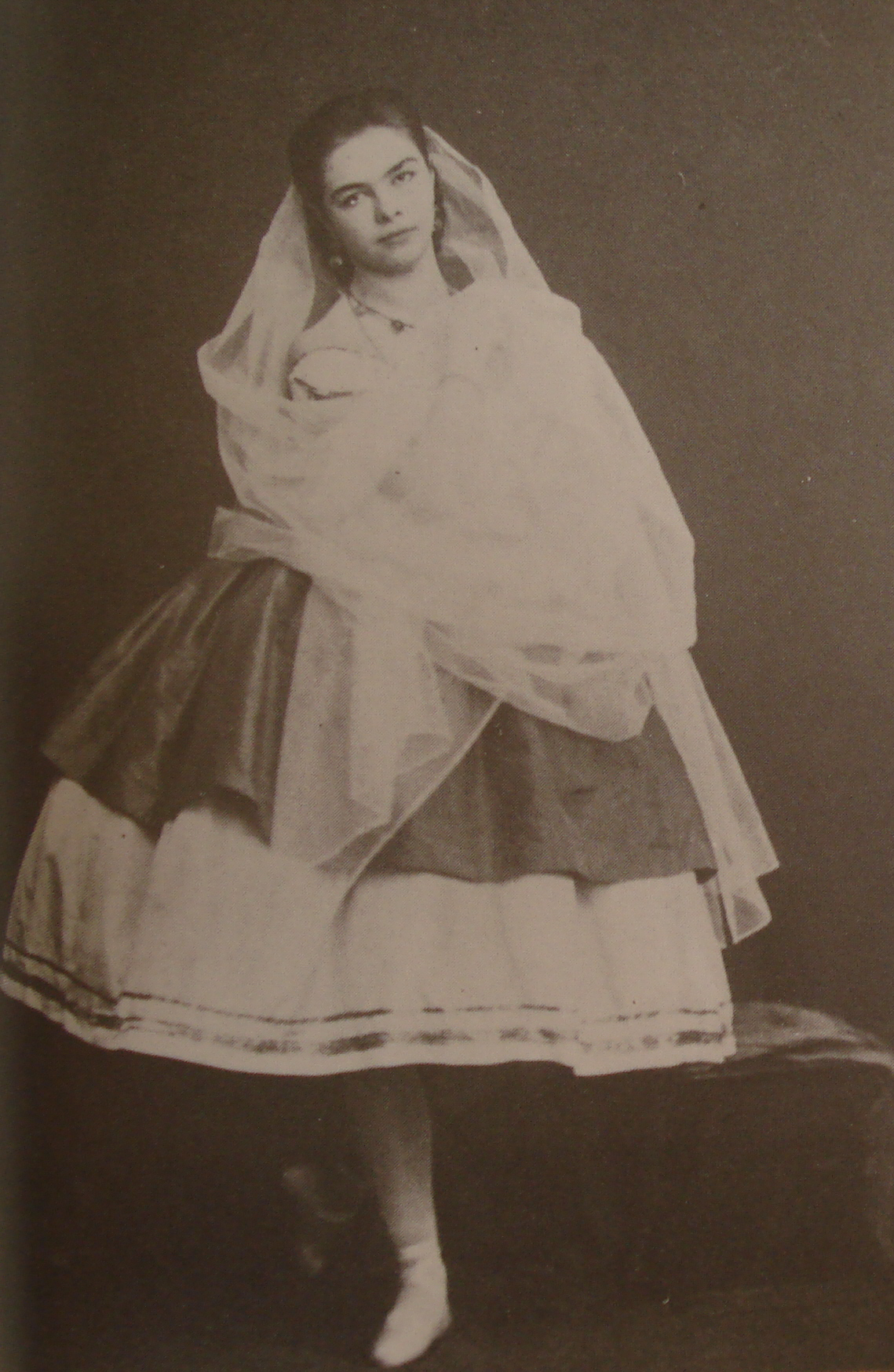
- Born: 21 September 1846; St Petersburg, Russian Empire
- Died: 13 December 1889 (aged 43); Crimea, Russian Empire
- Occupation: Ballerina
- Partner: Grand Duke Nikolai Nikolaevich
- Children: Olga Nikolaevna Nikolaeva; Vladimir Nikolaevich Nikolaev; Catherine Nikolaevna Nikolaeva; Nikolai Nikolaevich Nikolaev; Galina Nikolaevna Nikolaeva

Catherine Gavrilovna Chislova (Russian: Екатерина Гавриловна Числова) (21 September 1846 – 13 December 1889) was a Russian ballerina. She was the mistress of Grand Duke Nicholas Nikolaevich; they had five children.

== Life ==
Catherine Chislova was born on 21 September 1846, the daughter of Gabriel Chislov. She became a danceuse with the Imperial Ballet. She was an unrivalled partner to the famous Felix Kschessinsky in the Polish mazurka.

In the mid-1860s, Grand Duke Nicholas Nikolaevich, the third son of Emperor Nicholas I, fell in love with her and they became lovers. Although the Grand Duke was married, they had an open affair that caused a great scandal. He installed her in a fashionable house situated directly across from his own palace in the capital. When Chislova wanted her paramour to visit, she would light two candles and set them on her windowsill, where the Grand Duke could see them from the windows of his study. In 1868, Catherine gave birth to the first of their five children.

Tsar Alexander II advised his brother to be more discreet and the couple traveled to San Remo and the Crimea. In 1881, the Grand Duke's wife, Grand Duchess Alexandra Petrovna, retired to a convent in Kiev. Having given up her career as a dancer for him, and fearing for their children's well-being if something happened to him, Catherine Chislova begged Nicholas Nikolaievich to provide for her and their family. He arranged a change of class into the gentry for Catherine, and the couple's illegitimate children were granted the surname Nikolaiev on 8 December 1882 by Tsar Alexander III of Russia.

Unable to obtain a divorce, Grand Duke Nicholas Nicolaievich hoped to survive his wife and then marry his mistress. However, Catherine Chislova died unexpectedly in Crimea on 13 December 1889. She was buried in the monastery of Saint Serge in St Petersburg under the name Catherine Gavrilovna Nikolaiev. The Grand Duke had cancer and survived her by only two years. The couple's two sons were elevated to the Russian nobility in 1894.

== Children ==
- Olga Nikolaevna Nikolaeva, (10 June 1868 - 31 August 1950). She married Prince Mikhail Mikhailovich Cantacuzene (1858-1927), lieutenant-general, had two daughters, after the revolution they lived in France.
- Vladimir Nikolaevich Nikolaev (4 June 1873 - 28 January 1942). He was an adjutant to Emperor Nicholas II since 1893, after the revolution he lived in Paris, had five children from four marriages, whose descendants live in the south of France, Quebec, and Finland. Of these, only daughter Galina (1897-1971) remained in Soviet Russia - with her husband, Colonel Alexander Nikolayevich Gotovsky, who was shot in 1937. The couple had three sons: Rostislav (1922-1991), Sergey (1924-1946), George (1927-1932); the descendants of the eldest of them live in Moscow
- Catherine Nikolaevna Nikolaeva (1874 - 26 January 1940). She was married to Nikolai Korevo and Ivan Persiani. After the revolution, she lived in Belgrade where she died.
- Nicholas Nikolaevich Nikolaev (16 April 1875 - 9 January 1902). He was an adjutant to his halfbrother Grand Duke Nikolai Nikolayevich the Younger, He married Olga Dmitrievna Zabotkina (1871-1925) and they had two daughters. After his death, his widow became the wife of his brother Vladimir.
- Galina Nikolaevna Nikolaeva (28 January 1877 - 3 August 1878). Died in childhood.

== Lives of Chislova's children ==
Catherine Chislova's youngest daughter, Galina, died in childhood. Her remaining four children survived her. They were well provided for by their father and, from 1882, bore the last name Nikolaiev.

The eldest daughter Olga, who resembled her grandfather Tsar Nicholas I, married in 1892 Prince Michael Mikhailovich Cantacuzene (1858–1927). They had two daughters: Princess Irina Cantacuzene (1895–1945) and Princess Olga Cantacuzene (1899–1983). After the Russian Revolution, Olga Nikolaievna and her family lived in France.

Vladimir, the eldest son, followed a career in the army. In 1899, he joined a Cavalry Regiment. By 1913, he was aide-de-camp to Tsar Nicholas II. During World War I, he commanded a Cavalry regiment. Married four times, he divorced his first wife, Vera Popov, in 1907. After his second wife, Eleonore Lencione, died in 1913, Vladimir married his brother's widow, Olga Zabotkine. He survived the Russian revolution and settled in France, but Olga stayed behind and died during the famines in the Soviet Union. In exile, Vladimir married Marina Zabotkine, Olga's sister.

Catherine Nikolaevna had one daughter from her marriage to Nicholas Korevo; after they divorced, she married in 1914 Ivan Alexandrovich Persiani, who worked at the Russian Embassy in Rome. After the Russian revolution, Catherine Nikolaievna lived in exile. She died in Belgrade during World War II.

Nicholas Nikolaevich followed a military career under the direction of his uncle Grand Duke Michael Nicolaievich of Russia, eventually becoming his aide-de-camp. In 1894, he and his brother were admitted into the Russian nobility. He married Olga Zabotkine and they had two daughters. Nicholas died young. His widow eventually married Nicholas’ brother. His two daughters emigrated to Western Europe.

== See also ==
- List of Russian ballet dancers

== Bibliography ==
- Belyakova, Zoia, The Romanov Legacy: The Palaces of St. Petersburg, Hazar Publishing, 1994, ISBN 1-874371-27-X.
- Ferrand, Jacques. Descendances naturelles des souverains et grands-ducs de Russie, de 1762 à 1910 : répertoire généalogique, 1995.
- King Greg,The Court of the Last Tsar, Wiley, 2006, ISBN 978-0-471-72763-7.
