= Andrei Stackenschneider =

Russian architect (1802–1865)

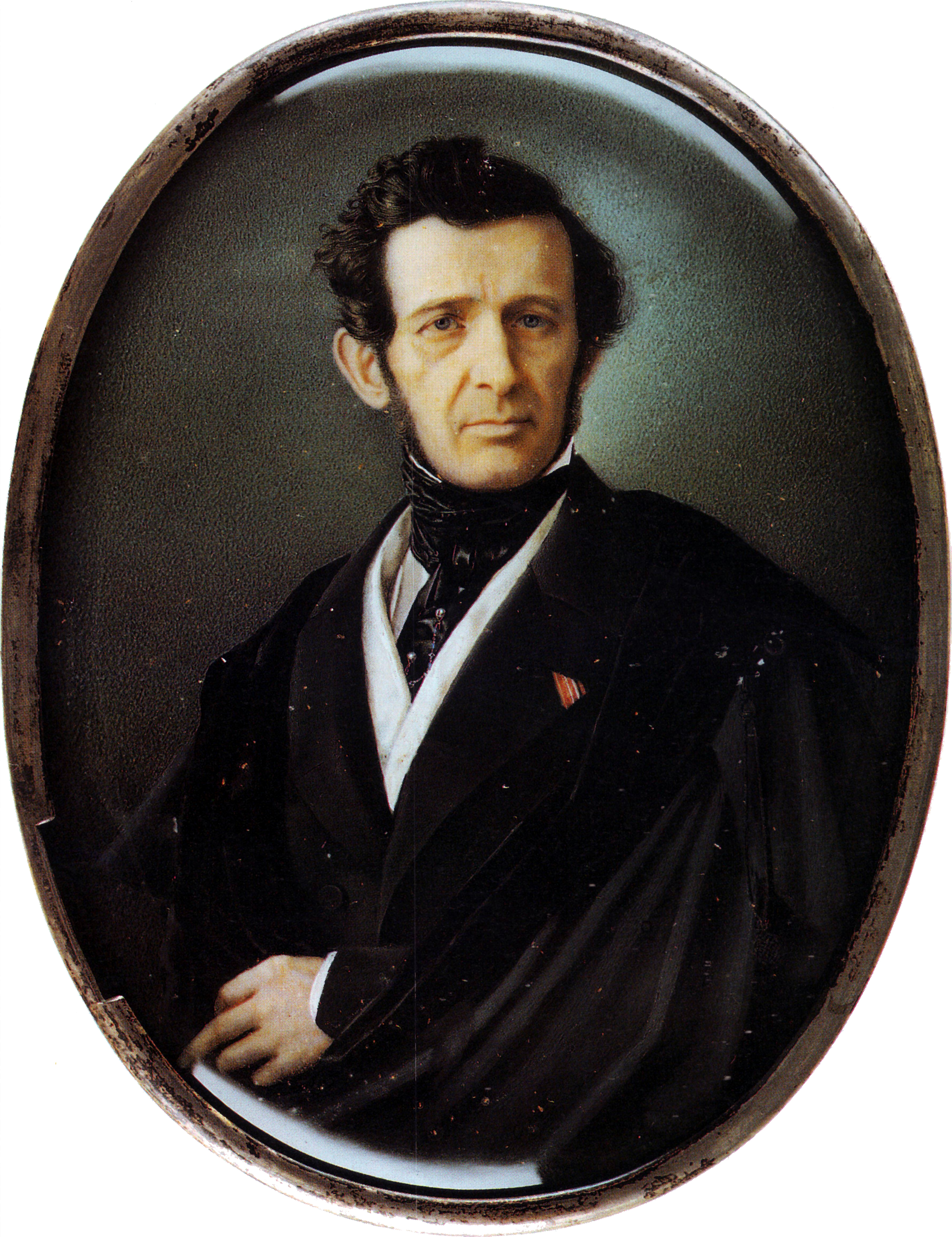
Portrait of Stackenschneider by Nikolai Terebenev, 1854

Andrei Ivanovich Stakenschneider (also spelled Stuckenschneider; Russian: Андрей Иванович Штакеншнейдер, romanized: Andrey Ivanovich Shtakenshneyder; 6 March [O.S. 22 February] 1802 – 20 August [O.S. 8 August] 1865) was a Russian architect. His eclectic approach and competence in period styles are manifest in ten palaces built to his design in St. Petersburg. He is often credited with turning Russian architecture from Neoclassicism to Romanticism.

== Life ==
Born into a prosperous family from Braunschweig that came to Russia on Tsar Paul I's request, Stakenschneider trained at the Imperial Academy of Arts, helping Auguste de Montferrand supervise the construction of Saint Isaac's Cathedral. He was a revivalist, finding his inspiration in Greek, Renaissance, Baroque, and Gothic styles. His first independent work was a Neo-Gothic castle at Keila-Joa, a residence of Count Alexander von Benckendorff near Tallinn.

In the late 1830s, Stakenschneider emerged as the chief court architect of Nicholas I of Russia. For this monarch and his children, he designed the Mariinsky Palace (1839–1844), Nicholas Palace (1853–1861), New Michael Palace (1857–1861), as well as the Beloselsky-Belozersky Palace (1846–1848) for Princess Kochubey. In Peterhof, he was responsible for the Farm Palace (1838–1855), the Belvedere Palace (1853–1856), and numerous garden pavilions.

Stakenschneider refurbished some rooms in the Winter Palace and applied the Greek Revival idioms to the imperial palace in Oreanda, Crimea (1842–1852; burnt down in 1882).

== Selected works ==
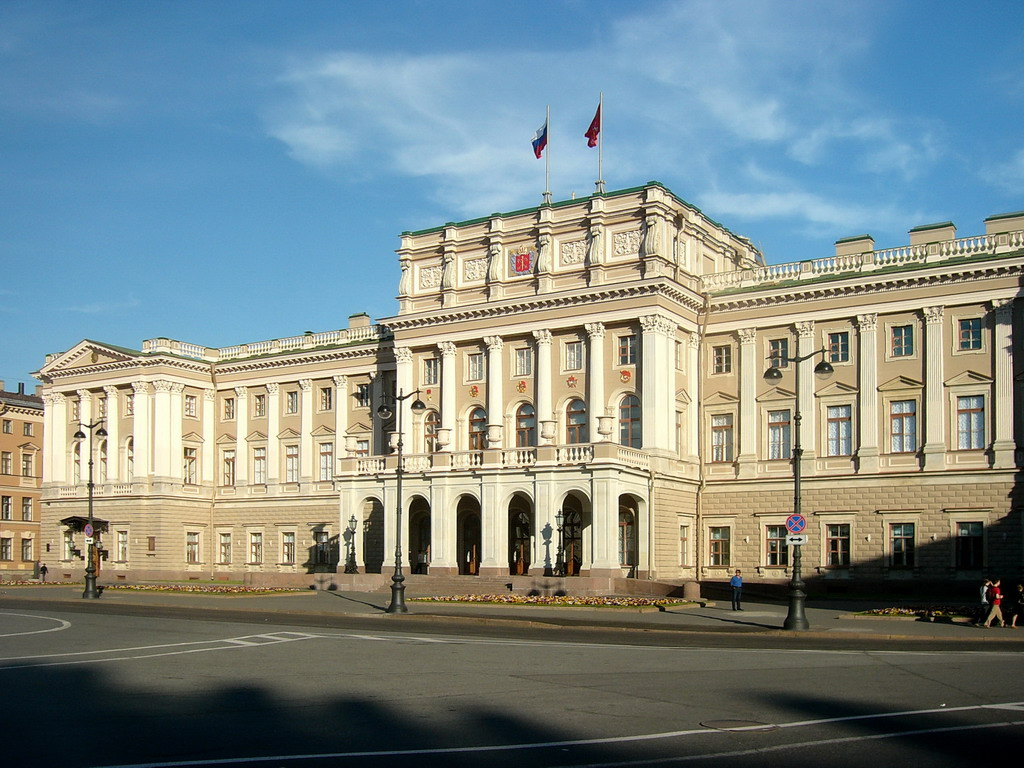
Mariinsky Palace in Saint Petersburg

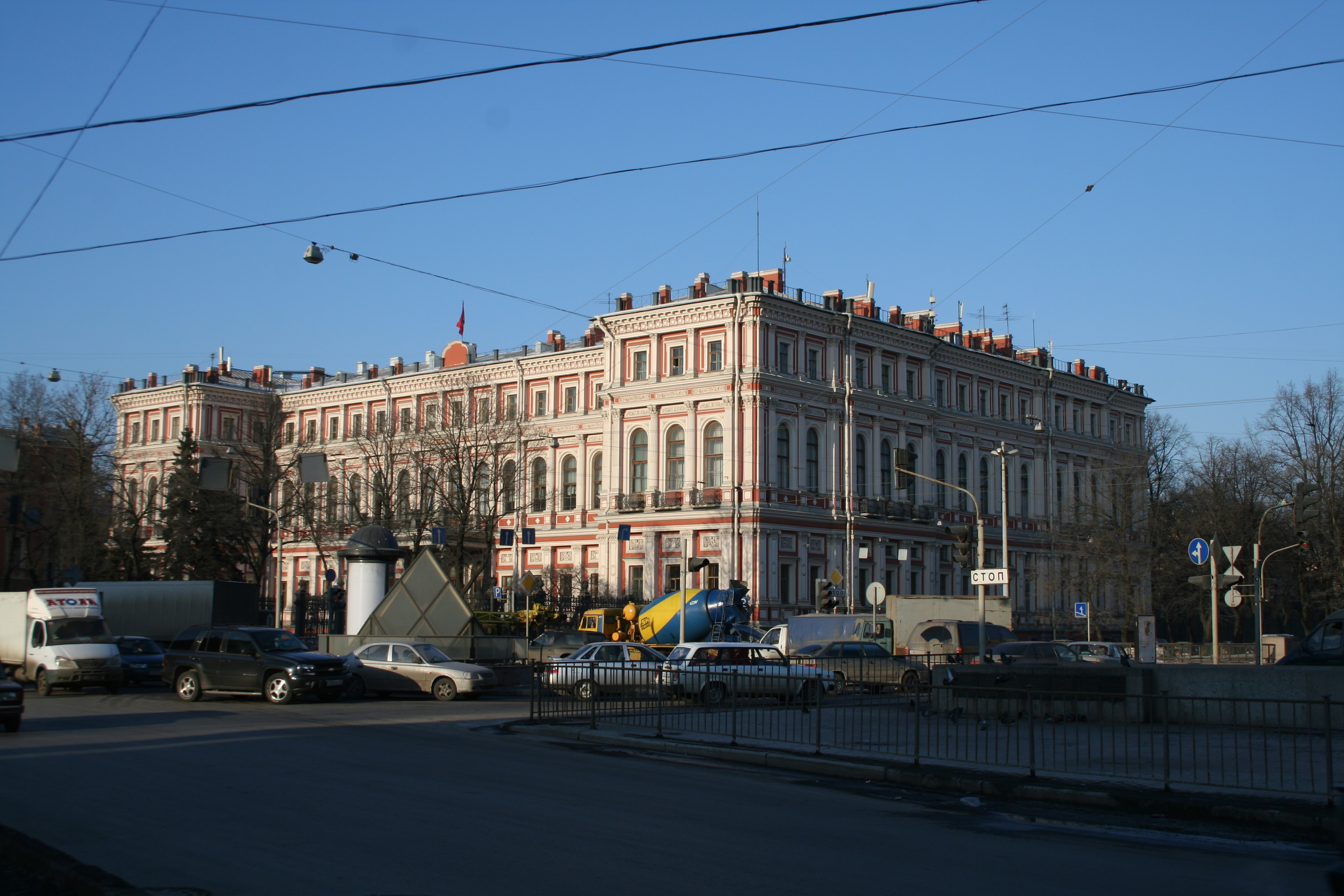
Nicholas Palace in Saint Petersburg

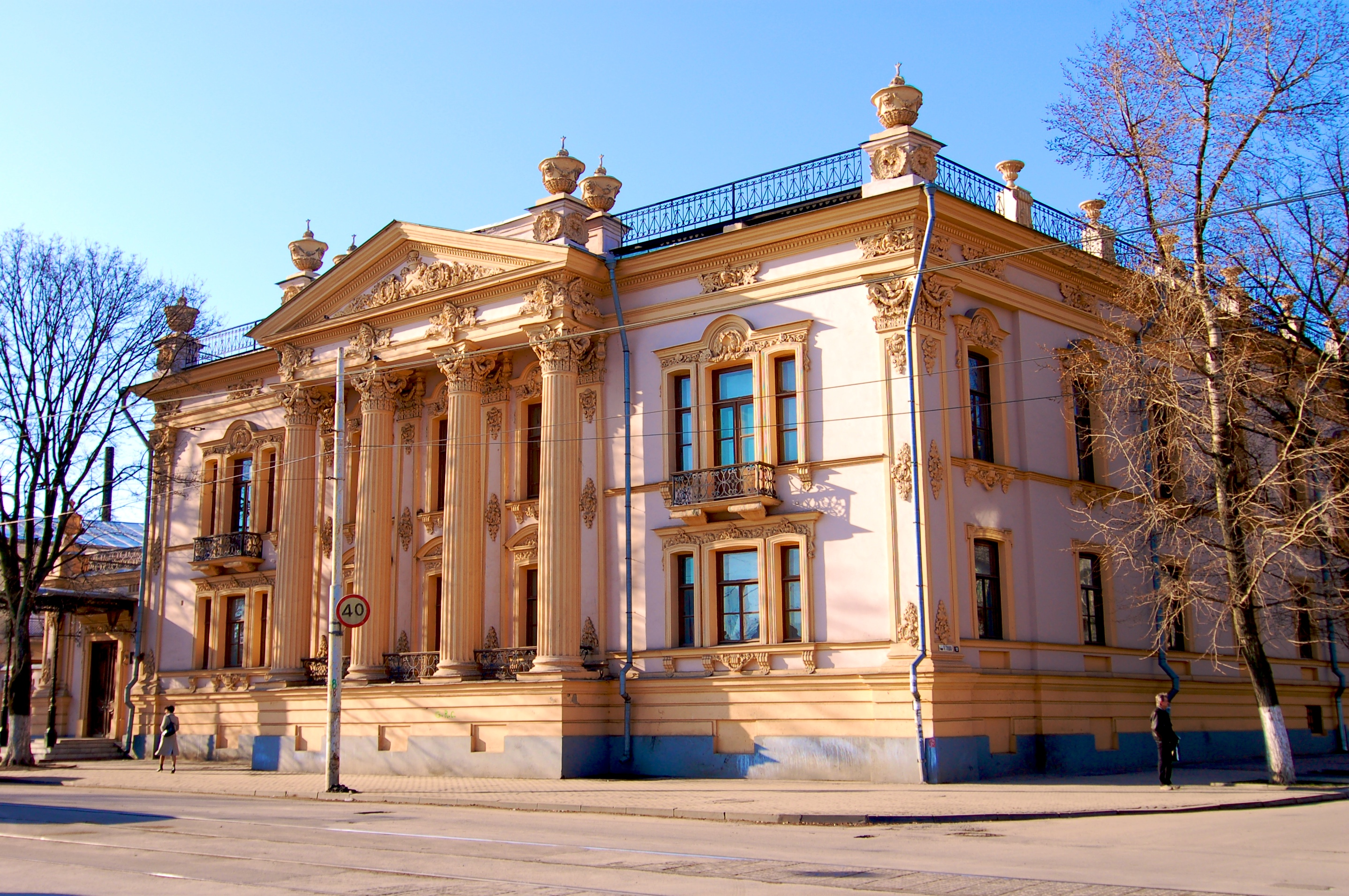
Alferaki Palace in Taganrog

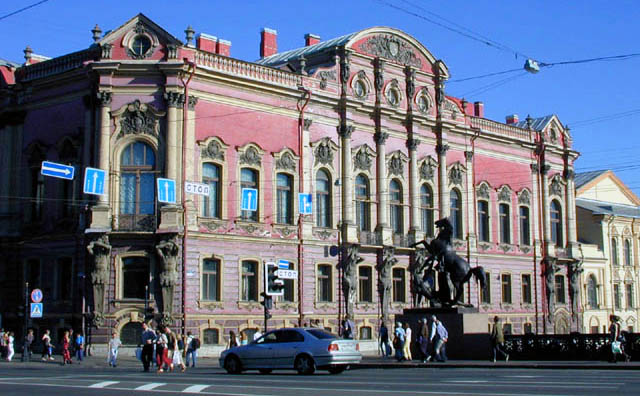
Beloselsky-Belozersky Palace in Saint Petersburg

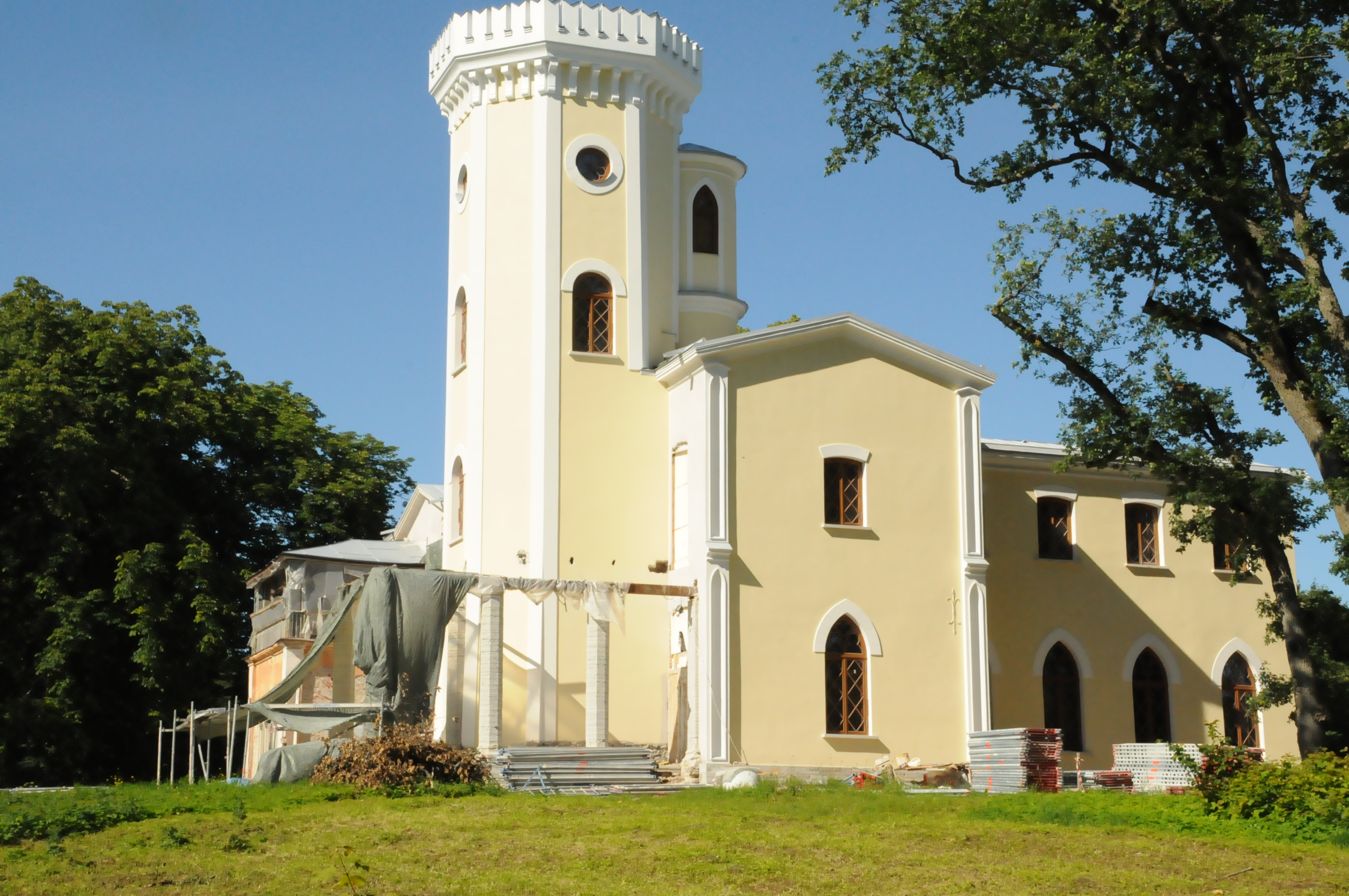
Keila-Joa manor in Estonia, Stackenschneider's first independent work

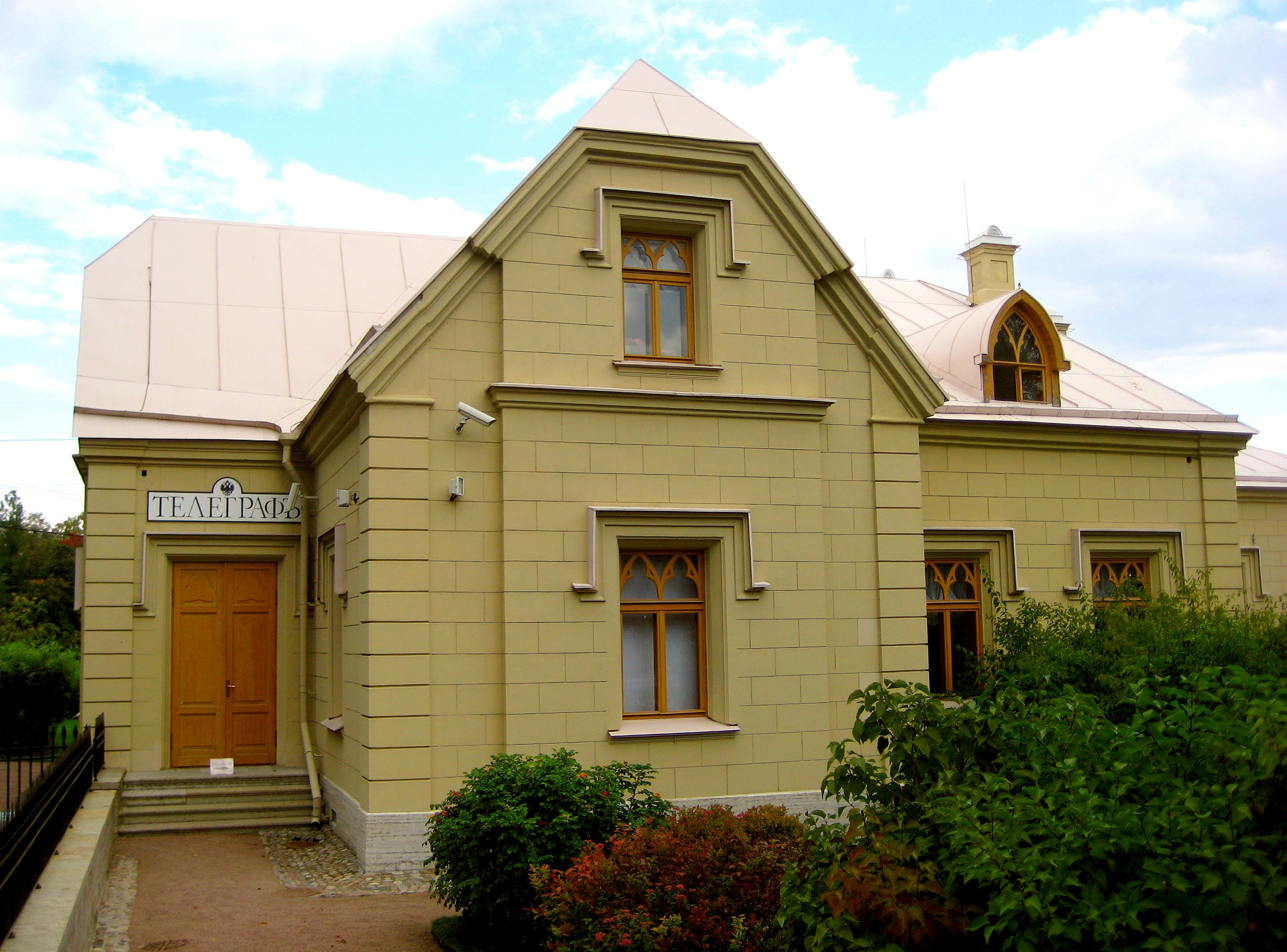
Palace Telegraph Station, located in Alexandria Park, Peterhof

== Sources ==
- Петрова Т.А. А. Штакеншнейдер. Л., 1978.
- "Штакеншнейдер, Андрей Иванович" . Brockhaus and Efron Encyclopedic Dictionary (in Russian). 1906.
