= Nikolai Karinsky =

Russian linguist, dialectologist and Slavist (1873-1935)

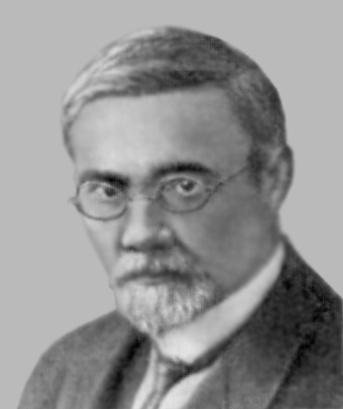
- Каринский, Николай Михайлович circa 1935
- Born: 22 March 1873; Vyatka, Russian Empire
- Died: 14 December 1935 (aged 62); Moscow, USSR

Academic background
- Education: St. Petersburg University

Academic work
- Discipline: Linguist
- Sub-discipline: Dialectology, Slavic studies

Nikolai Mikhailovich Karinsky (Russian: Николай Михайлович Каринский; Vyatka, Russian Empire, 22 March 1873 – Moscow, Soviet Union, 14 December 1935) was a Russian linguist, dialectologist, Slavist, correspondent member of the Russian Academy of Sciences since 1921, correspondent member of the Academy of Sciences of the USSR since 1925.

He graduated from St. Petersburg University in 1896. He became a professor there seven years later. In 1911 he taught at the Pedagogical Institute, the Institute of History and Philology (1913–1917) at the Pedagogical Institute at Vyatka (1919–1923) and at the State Pedagogical Institute in Moscow (1930–1935). From 1931 he was the head of the Dialektography Commission of the Language and Thought Institute of the USSR.

He authored numerous works on the History of Russian and Old Bulgarian Languages, Russian dialects, and Slavic paleography.

When the Saint Petersburg Public Library decided to prepare a folder of their most valuable Slavic manuscripts, Karinsky, a lecturer in paleography at the Archeological Institute, was chosen to select and edit the Slavic material. The folder was published in 1914.
