= Nicholas Palace =

Palace near St. Petersburg, Russia

Coordinates: 59.932°N 30.293°E

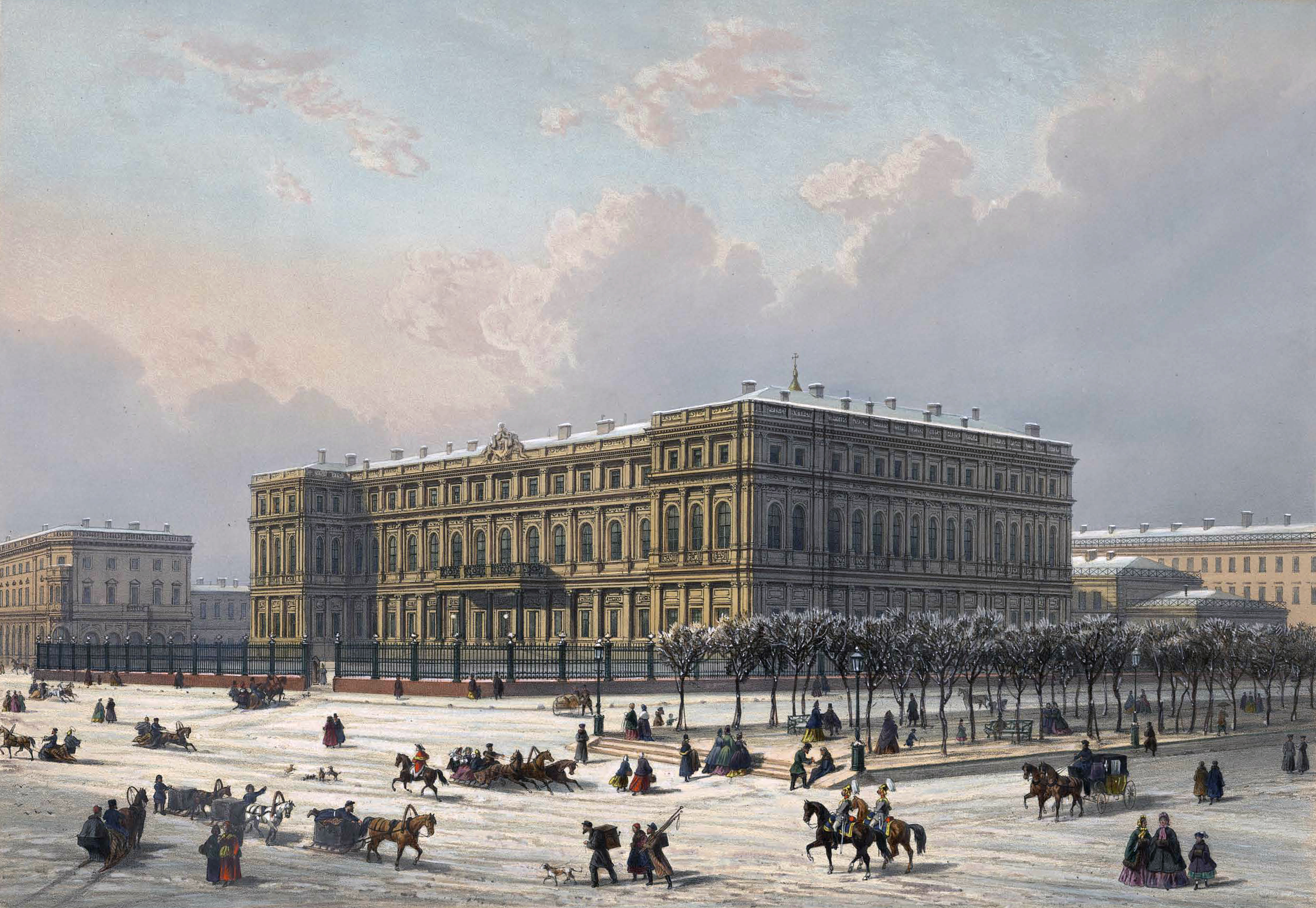
Nicholas Palace in 1861.

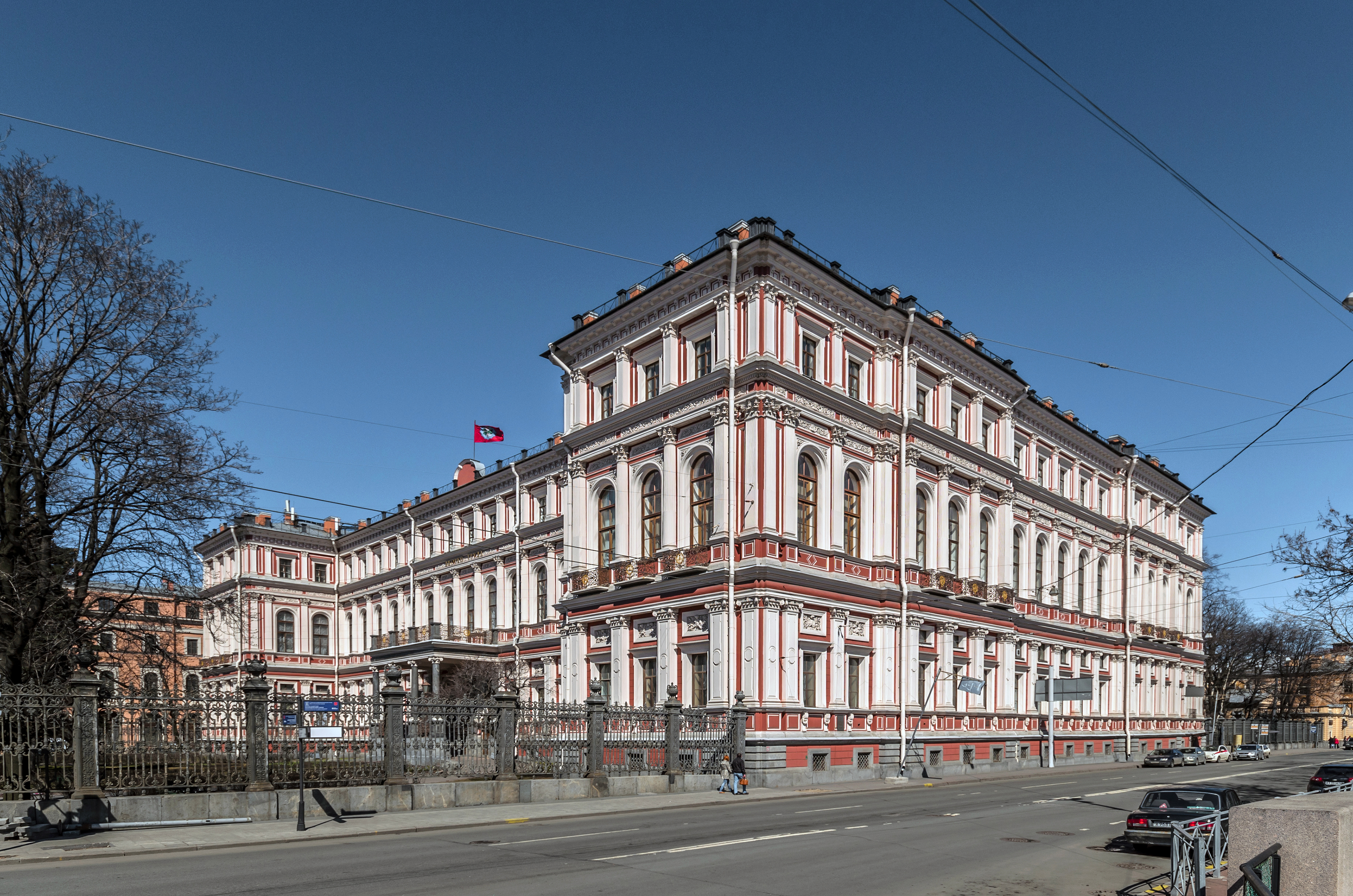
Nicholas Palace today.

Nicholas Palace (Russian: Николаевский дворец, Nikolayevsky dvorets) is one of several Saint Petersburg palaces designed by Andreas Stackensneider (1802–65) for the children of Nicholas I of Russia. The palace of Grand Duke Nikolai Nikolaievich of Russia forms part of a sprawling complex incorporating a palatial church, a manege, and several outbuildings separated from Labour Square by a cast-iron fence.

In 1894 the edifice reverted to the crown and was transformed into the Kseniinsky Institute for Noble Young Ladies (Russian: Ксенинский институт благородных девиц, Kseninskii institut blagorodnykh devits). It was described by E. M. Almedingen in her memoirs:

At certain functions in the great paneled white hall it was easy to imagine yourself plunged into the court life of the late eighteenth century. ... The palace, for all its enormous size, was beautiful. The sweep of that regal, gray marble staircase, curving off to the right and the left, must have been an architectural marvel. We played in halls, their high ceilings supported by Corinthian pillars, their walls covered with most exquisite paneling. We read and studied in rooms with lovely mirrors, framed in the scrolled and carven fantasies of great artists. We slept in dormitories, their walls covered by delicate frescoes. ... The exquisite staircase... swept down to a hall where a gigantic Cerberus of a porter, magnificent in scarlet and gold, stood on duty. The great front doors, splendid with carved wood and panes of cut glass, were nearly always closed.

The Bolsheviks renamed it Palace of Labour (Russian: Дворец труда, Dvorets truda) and handed it over to the trade unions, who destroyed some parts of the original eclectic interiors in order to adapt the palace for their own headquarters. As of 2004, the trade unions are leasing a large part of the edifice to commercial enterprises as offices.

== Architectural features ==
The Nicholas Palace became the dominant feature of Blagoveshchenskaya Square (today's Labour Square). The architect Andreas Stackensneider chose Italian Renaissance architectural techniques for the façade. In the eastern part of the palace, on the garden side, the house church was located.

For the decoration of the vestibule, Stackensneider used bricks and stone leftover from the construction of St. Isaac's Cathedral. The staircase was decorated with seventeen paintings by the artist Nikolai Tikhobrazov. The enfilade of the first floor began with the White Drawing Room, decorated with moulded overdoors and picturesque panels. Then came the Small Dining Room and the Chinese Drawing Room. In the centre of the west façade was the Rose Drawing Room, the ceiling of which was decorated with the painting "The Judgement of Paris". In the northwest part of the mezzanine, there were the Ballroom and the Banqueting Room with a height of 17 metres. The Dancing Hall was decorated with sculptures by Iensen. The furniture for the staterooms was made by the master Andrei Tour.

== Bibliography ==
- Belyakova Z.I. Nikolayevsky dvorets. SPb, 1997.
