= Grand Duke Nicholas Nikolaevich of Russia (born 1831) =

Russian grand duke and marshal (1831–1891)

Grand Duke Nicholas Nikolaevich
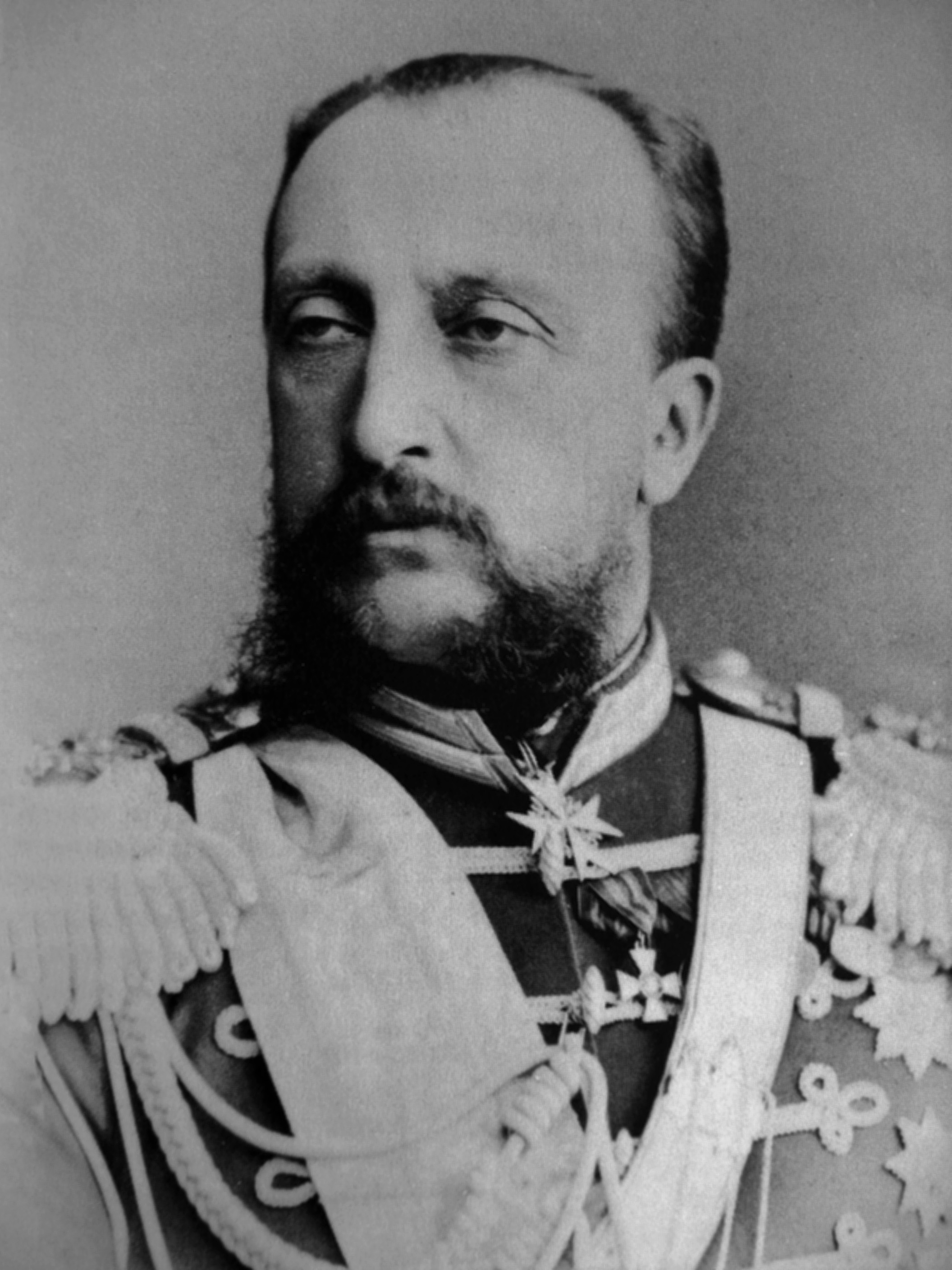
- Born: 8 August 1831; Tsarskoye Selo, Saint Petersburg, Russian Empire
- Died: 25 April 1891 (aged 59); Alupka, Taurida Governorate, Russian Empire
- Spouse: Duchess Alexandra Petrovna of Oldenburg (m. 1856)
- Issue: Grand Duke Nicholas Nikolaevich; Grand Duke Peter Nikolaevich; Olga Nikolaevna Nikolaeva; Vladimir Nikolaevich Nikolaev; Catherine Nikolaevna Nikolaeva; Nicholas Nikolaevich Nikolaev; Galina Nikolaevna Nikolaeva
- House: Holstein-Gottorp-Romanov
- Father: Nicholas I of Russia
- Mother: Charlotte of Prussia

Grand Duke Nicholas Nikolaevich of Russia (Russian: Великий князь Николай Николаевич; 8 August 1831 – 25 April 1891) was the third son and sixth child of Tsar Nicholas I of Russia and Alexandra Feodorovna. He may also be referred to as Nicholas Nikolaevich the Elder to tell him apart from his son, Grand Duke Nicholas Nikolaevich of Russia (1856–1929). Trained for the military, as a Field Marshal he commanded the Russian army of the Danube in the Russo-Turkish War, 1877–1878.

== Military career ==
Grand Duke Nicholas Nikolaevich was born on 8 August 1831 at Tsarskoye Selo in St. Petersburg.

His father arranged for Nicholas Nikolaevich a career in the army. On the day he was born, he was appointed honorary colonel in the Life Guard Lancers and enlisted into the Life Guard Sappers battalion. A soldier most of his life, he first saw active service in the Crimea War, when he was in his early twenties, taking part in the battle of Inkerman (1854). Grand Duke Nicholas Nicolaievich showed a special interest in military engineering. In 1856, he was appointed as general Inspector of engineers and in 1864, he became commander of the Imperial Guard. In 1873, he accompanied his brother, Alexander II, to Berlin at the meeting of the three emperors: Russia, Germany and Austria.

The epitome of his career was the Russo-Turkish War, 1877–1878, when Nicholas Nicolaievich was appointed Commander-in-Chief of the Russian armies of the Danube, although his reputation as a strategist was very low. The Grand Duke had no particular distinction in early successes in the conflict and these were followed by terrible reverses of the armies under his orders. After the expulsion of the Russian troops from Rumelia and unsuccessful attacks at Plevna, Nicholas Nicolaievich was removed from actual command, although in theory he remained in his post. The victory of his subordinates allowed him to participate in the success at Adrianople and the Treaty of San Stefano, but after the war ended, he was criticized for not seizing Constantinople when his headquarters were already established in Adrianople. The Grand Duke also suffered the acute embarrassment of being charged with financial irregularities, of receiving bribes and embezzling money from the government.

His brother, Alexander II, promoted Nicholas Nicolaievich's career and named him Commander of the St Petersburg military region. Eventually he received the ranks of Field Marshal-General, Inspector General of Cavalry and Inspector General of the Russian engineering forces. Nicholas Nicholaievich was an influential military figure; he also served on the State Council.

== A Russian Grand Duke ==
Nicholas “loved all women except for his wife” as a contemporary wrote. He enjoyed army life, hunting and was a well-known gourmet. He was also an expert on cattle, purebred dogs, horse breeding, fishing and hunting. In his residence in St Petersburg, the Nikolayevsky Palace, built between 1853 and 1861, horses were a favorite topic of conversation. The Grand Duke Nicholas Nicolaievich took great interest in managing his estates, but he failed to inspire affection, even in those closest to him.

== Marriage ==
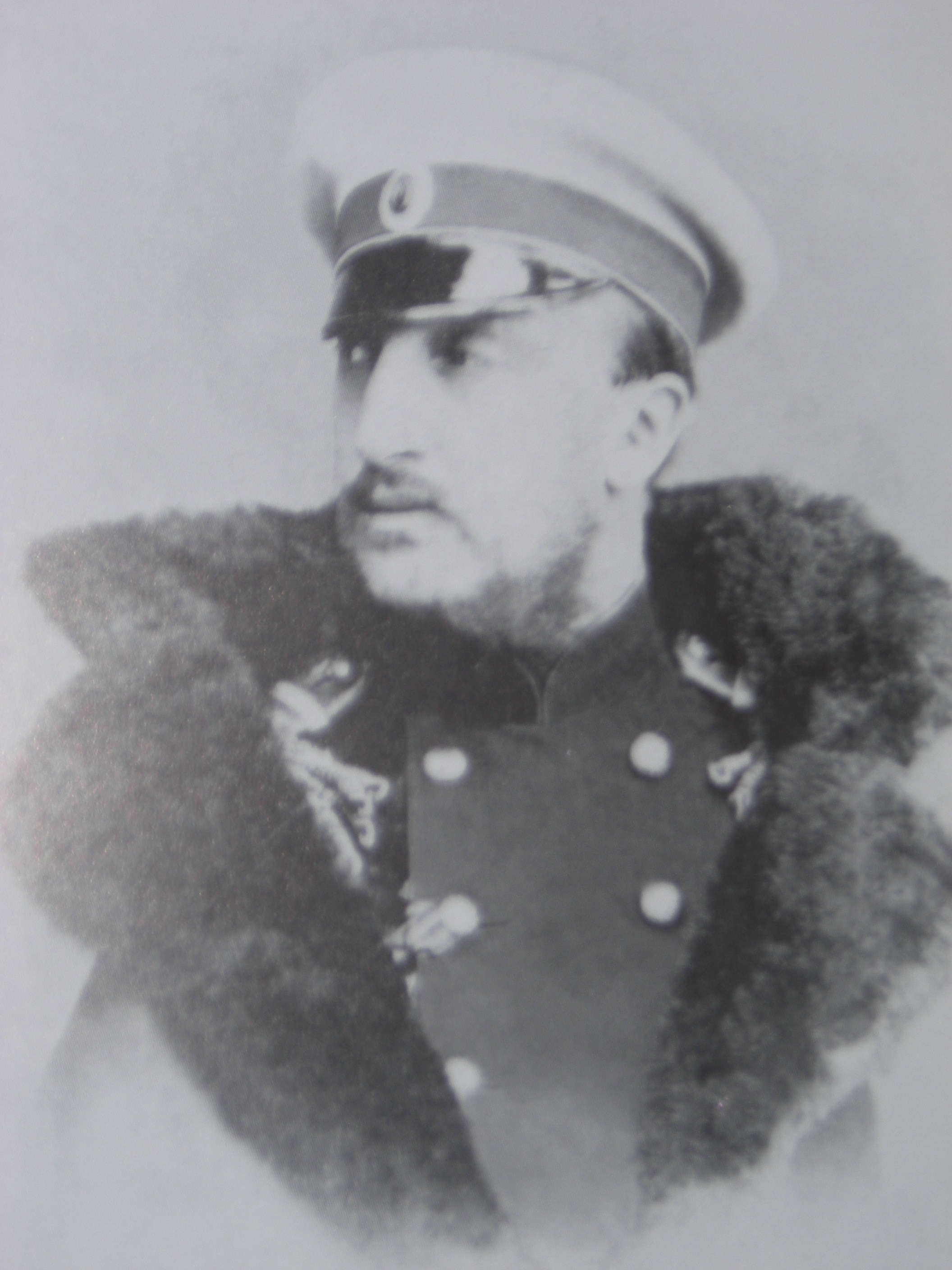
Grand Duke Nicholas Nikolaevich of Russia in his youth

Nicholas Nikolaevich unwillingly married his first cousin once removed Grand Duchess Alexandra Petrovna, formerly Princess Alexandra of Oldenburg (1838–1900), whose paternal grandmother was Catherine Pavlovna, fourth daughter of Emperor Paul I, Nicholas's grandfather. The wedding took place in St Petersburg on 6 February 1856. Alexandra was plain and unsophisticated and the couple soon found out that they had little in common. They had two children:

- Grand Duke Nicholas Nikolaevich of Russia the Younger (1856–1929)
- Grand Duke Peter Nikolaevich of Russia (1864–1931)

The marriage was in trouble from the start and four years later, Nicholas developed a permanent relationship with Catherine Chislova, a dancer from the Krasnoye Selo Theater. Their affair was quite open and they had five children:

- Olga Nikolaevna Nikolayeva (1868–1950) m. Prince Michael Cantacuzene
- Vladimir Nikolaevich Nikolayev (1873–1942)
- Catherine Nikolaevna Nikolayeva (1874–1940)
- Nicholas Nikolaevich Nikolayev (1875–1902)
- Galina Nikolaevna Nikolayeva (1877–1878)

The Grand Duke arranged a change of class into the gentry for his mistress and the couple's illegitimate children took the surname Nikolayev. Alexander II ignored his brother's affair but advised him to be discreet.

== Last years ==
Grand Duke Nicholas Nikolaevich of Russia

Nicholas Nicolaievich was in Cannes with his two sons when his brother Alexander II was assassinated, returning immediately to Russia in March 1881. The ascension to the Russian throne of his nephew, Alexander III, marked the beginning of the Grand Duke's steady decline. Alexander III did not have any special sympathy for his uncle and Nicholas Nicholaievich was resolutely deprived of all his influence. His authority suffered even further when he was involved in fraudulent military requisitions. When the Grand Duke tried to explain his actions to the Nouvelle Revue of Paris 1880, he indiscreetly attacked government officials and military commanders and eventually was removed from his post. Alexander III also criticized his uncle's extramarital affairs.

By then, Nicholas Nicholaievich was living openly with his mistress. His wife the Grand Duchess left him for good in 1881 and moved to Kiev, but refused to grant the divorce he wanted. The couple's adult sons took their mother's side in the family breakup, but continued to live at the palace and confronted Catherine once she was waiting for their father in the Palace he shared with his wife. Catherine Chislova nagged Nicholas to provide for her and their children, he soon became financially embarrassed and had to mortgage Nicholas Palace in St. Petersburg. In 1882, Nicholas Nicolaievich was put under supervision due to the squandering of his fortune; he lived as a private gentleman in a modest house.

Grand Duke Nicholas Nicolaievich, unable to get a divorce, hoped to survive his wife and then marry his mistress, but it was Catherine Chislova who died unexpectedly in Crimea while Grand Duchess Alexandra Petrovna would survive him by nine years. Shortly after his mistress' death, Nicholas went mad; he had oral cancer that spread to his brain. Suffering from delusion, he was convinced that all women were in love with him. During one ballet performance, the Grand Duke even attacked a young male dancer that he took to be a woman. In 1890, Nicholas Nicolaievich was declared insane and kept locked indoors in Crimea. He died in Alupka, Crimea on 25 April 1891. The Grand Duke's reputation at the imperial court was low and his death was not deeply felt. He had squandered all his tremendous wealth and his palace was immediately sold to cancel his massive debts.

=== Honours ===
Russian

- Knight of St. Andrew, 8 August 1831
- Knight of St. Alexander Nevsky, 8 August 1831
- Knight of the White Eagle, 8 August 1831
- Knight of St. Anna, 1st Class, 8 August 1831
- Knight of St. George, 4th Class, 24 October 1854; 2nd Class, 15 July 1877; 1st Class, 28 November 1877
- Knight of St. Vladimir, 1st Class, 1 January 1863
- Knight of St. Stanislaus, 1st Class, 1865

Foreign

- Austrian Empire: Grand Cross of the Royal Hungarian Order of St. Stephen, 1851
- Baden:
  - Knight of the House Order of Fidelity, 29 May 1852
  - Grand Cross of the Zähringer Lion, 29 May 1852
- Kingdom of Bavaria: Knight of St. Hubert, 19 March 1852
- Belgium: Grand Cordon of the Order of Leopold
- Denmark: Knight of the Elephant, 1 September 1868
- (Saxe-Coburg and Gotha) (Duchy of Saxe-Altenburg) (Saxe-Meiningen) Ernestine duchies: Grand Cross of the Saxe-Ernestine House Order, 1874
- French Empire: Grand Cross of the Legion of Honour, May 1860
- Kingdom of Greece: Grand Cross of the Redeemer, 1867
- Grand Duchy of Hesse: Grand Cross of the Ludwig Order, 7 June 1852
- Kingdom of Italy: Knight of the Annunciation, 14 August 1876
- Holy See: Grand Cross of the Holy Sepulchre of Jerusalem, 28 October 1872
- Mecklenburg:
  - Grand Cross of the Wendish Crown, with Crown in Ore, 30 August 1869
  - Military Merit Cross, 2nd Class, June 1877; 1st Class, November 1877 (Schwerin)
- Principality of Montenegro: Grand Cross of the Order of Prince Danilo I, 28 December 1868
- Netherlands: Grand Cross of the Netherlands Lion, 30 August 1849
- Oldenburg: Grand Cross of the Order of Duke Peter Friedrich Ludwig, with Golden Crown, 26 July 1853
- Ottoman Empire: Order of Osmanieh, 1st Class in Diamonds, 26 November 1872
- Kingdom of Prussia:
  - Knight of the Black Eagle, 14 June 1838; with Collar, 1861
  - Pour le Mérite (military), 8 December 1871; with Oak Leaves, 1877
  - Grand Commander's Cross of the Royal House Order of Hohenzollern, 25 September 1872
- Duchy of Parma: Senator Grand Cross of the Constantinian Order of St. George, 1852
- Persian Empire: Order of the August Portrait, in Diamonds, 20 May 1873
- Kingdom of Romania: Order of the Star of Romania, Grand Cross, September 1877
- Saxe-Weimar-Eisenach: Order of the White Falcon, Grand Cross, 19 June 1852
- Kingdom of Saxony: Knight of the Rue Crown, 27 February 1852
- Principality of Serbia: Order of the Cross of Takovo, Grand Cross, 7 March 1878
- Sweden-Norway: Knight of the Seraphim, 19 July 1875
- Two Sicilies: Grand Cross of St. Ferdinand and Merit, 2 May 1852
- Württemberg:
  - Grand Cross of the Württemberg Crown, 1867
  - Grand Cross of the Military Merit Order, 10 September 1878

== Ancestry ==
Ancestors of Grand Duke Nicholas Nikolaevich of Russia (born 1831)

8. Peter III of Russia
4. Paul I of Russia
9. Catherine II of Russia
2. Nicholas I of Russia
10. Frederick II Eugene, Duke of Württemberg
5. Duchess Sophie Dorothea of Württemburg
11. Margravine Friederike Dorothea of Brandenburg-Schwedt
1. Grand Duke Nicholas Nikolaevich of Russia
12. Frederick William II of Prussia
6. Frederick William III of Prussia
13. Landgravine Frederika Louisa of Hesse-Darmstadt
3. Princess Charlotte of Prussia
14. Charles II, Grand Duke of Mecklenburg-Strelitz
7. Duchess Louise of Mecklenburg-Strelitz
15. Princess Friederike of Hesse-Darmstadt

== Bibliography ==
- Alexander, Grand Duke of Russia, Once a Grand Duke, Cassell, London, 1932.
- Beliakova, Zoia, The Romanov Legacy : The Palaces of St. Petersburg, Hazar Publishing, 1994, ISBN 1-874371-27-X.
- Chavchavadze, David, The Grand Dukes, Atlantic, 1989, ISBN 0-938311-11-5
- King, Greg The Court of the Last Tsar, Wiley, 2006, ISBN 978-0-471-72763-7.
- Perry, John and Pleshakov, Constantine, The Flight of the Romanovs, Basic Books, 1999, ISBN 0-465-02462-9.
- Zeepvat, Charlotte, The Camera and the Tsars, Sutton Publishing, 2004, ISBN 0-7509-3049-7.
