= Shuvalov =

Russian noble family

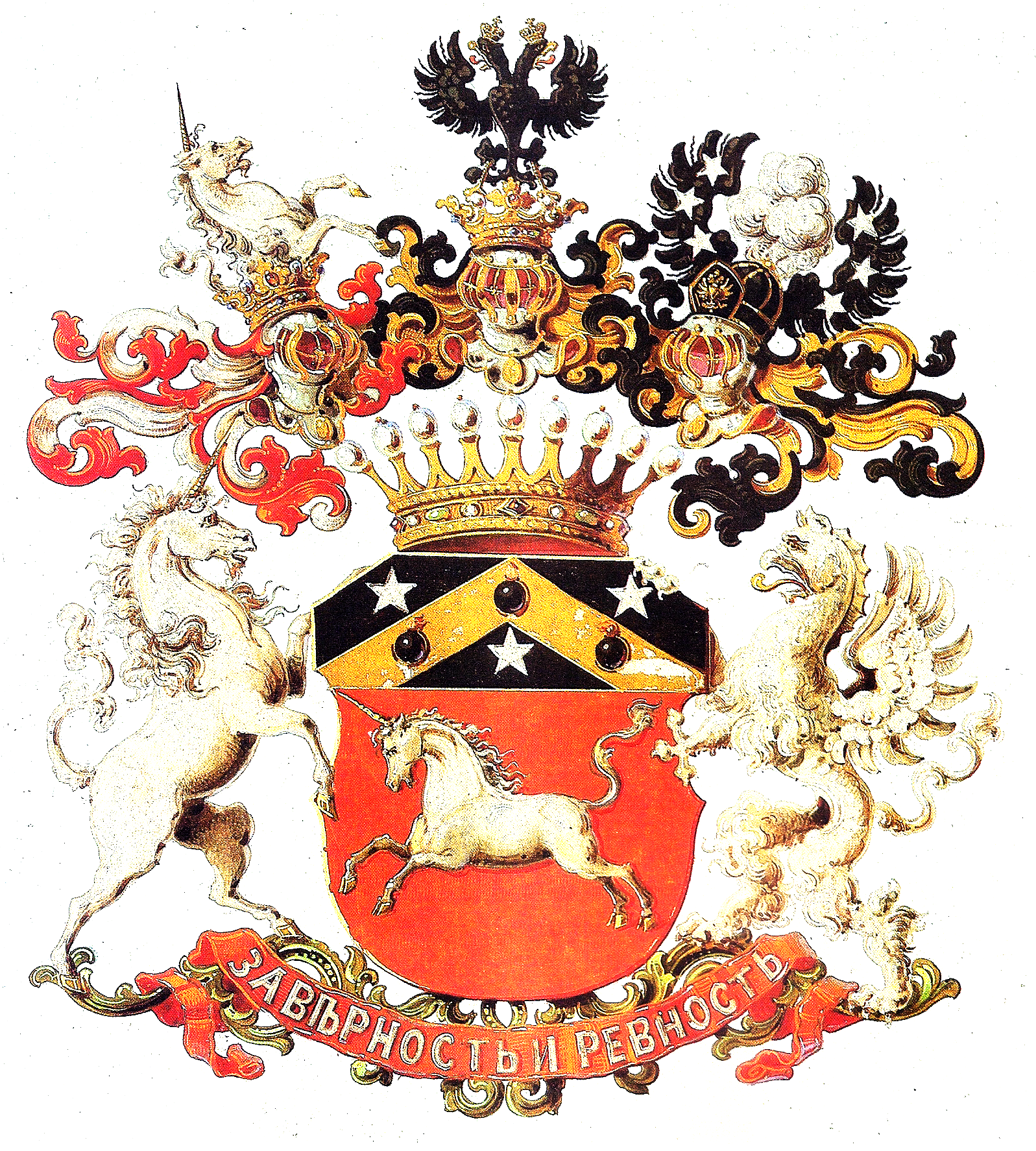
Coat of arms of the Shuvalov family

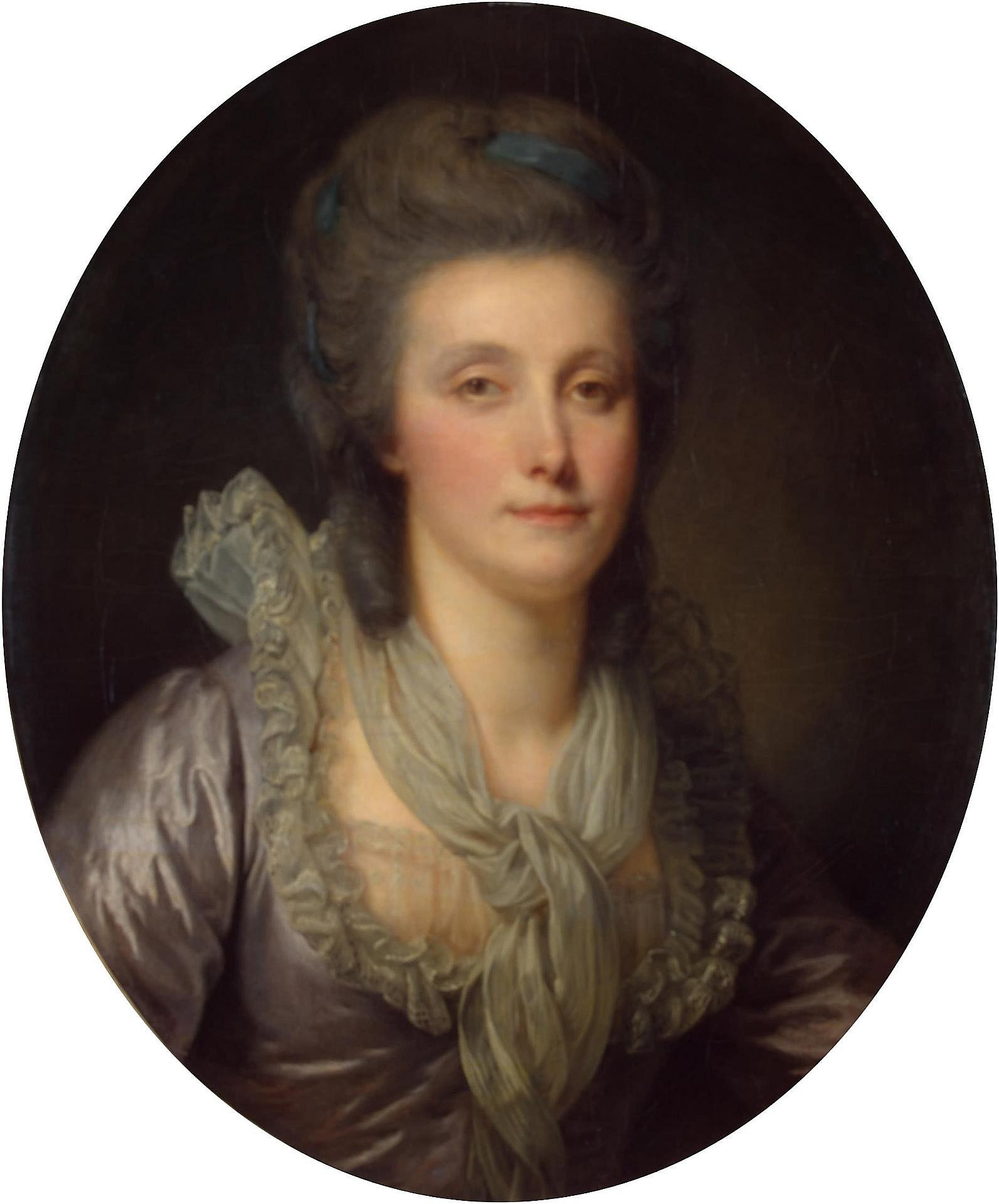
Portrait of Countess Catherine P. Shuvalova by Greuze, 1770s

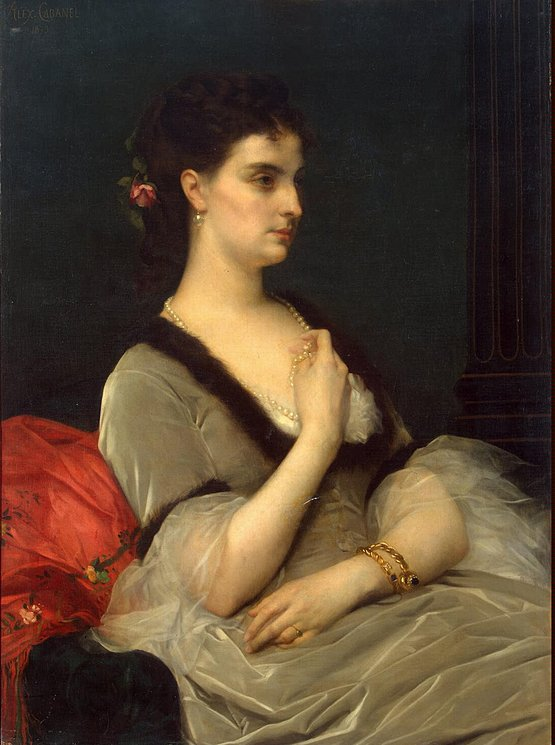
Countess Elizabeth Andreevna Shuvalova (1845–1924)

The House of Shuvalov (Russian: Шува́лов) is the name of a Russian noble family, which was documented since the 16th century. The Shuvalov family rose to distinction during the reign of Empress Elizabeth and was elevated to the rank of count on 5 September 1746.

== Notable family members ==
- Ivan Ivanovich Shuvalov (1727–1797), a lover of Empress Elizabeth and Maecenas of the Russian Enlightenment, who declined a comital title offered to him by the sovereign
- Count Alexander Ivanovich Shuvalov (1710–1771), the latter's first cousin, a Field Marshal and head of the secret police
- Countess Ekaterina Alexandrovna Shuvalova (1733 –1821), daughter of the above, state lady
- Count Peter Ivanovich Shuvalov (1711–1762), the brother of Alexander, a Field Marshal and Minister of War, one of the most influential policy-makers during Elizabeth's reign
- Countess Mavra Shuvalova (1708–1759), the latter's wife, who was a confidante of Empress Elizabeth of Russia
- Count Andrey Petrovich Shuvalov (1743–1789), Peter Ivanovich's son, who spent most of his life abroad, conversing with Voltaire and writing libertarian verses in French; the 1911 Encyclopædia Britannica names him as the true author of Catherine II's celebrated letters to the French Encyclopedists
- Countess Catherine Shuvalova (1743–1817), the latter's wife, who was Catherine II's Lady-in-waiting of the Imperial Court of Russia
- Count Peter Andreyevich Shuvalov (1827–1889), Andrey Petrovich's grandson, who wielded great influence at the court of Alexander II of Russia
- Count Pavel Andreyevich Shuvalov (1830–1908), the latter's brother, who represented Russia at the Congress of Berlin and at the German court
- Count Pavel Pavlovich Shuvalov (1859–1905), the latter's son, who headed the Moscow police before his assassination by revolutionaries in 1905
- Count Pavel Andreyevich Shuvalov (1776–1823), a Russian general during the Patriotic War of 1812
- Count Mikhail Andreyevich Shuvalov (1850–1903), who inherited the title of Prince Vorontsov from his maternal grandfather, but died without issue
- Countess Elizabeth Andreevna Shuvalova (1845–1924), the latter's sister, who inherited the fortune of her brother and married Count Illarion Vorontsov-Dashkov

== Other people with the Shuvalov name ==
- Igor Shuvalov (born 1967), First Deputy Prime Minister of Russia
- Iryna Shuvalova (born 1986), Ukrainian poet, translator and scholar
- Polina Shuvalova (born 2001), Russian chess player
- Sergei Shuvalov (1951–2021), Russian politician
- Vadim Shuvalov (born 1958), Russian politician

== Residences ==
The Shuvalov family's residences included three palaces in Saint Petersburg and a manor nearby:

- Shuvalov Mansion – the Baroque palace of Ivan Shuvalov on Italyanskaya Street, constructed in 1749–55 to a design by Savva Chevakinsky and later sold to the Ministry of Justice of the Russian Empire, best known as the place where the Imperial Academy of Arts started to operate;
- Moika Palace – the Neoclassical palace of Peter Ivanovich Shuvalov, later sold to the House of Yusupov (who decorated it with shameless opulence), best known as the place where Rasputin was killed (, , , );
- Naryshkin-Shuvalov Palace – a Neoclassical palace on the Fontanka Embankment that was inherited by Pavel Petrovich Shuvalov in 1900 from the Naryshkin family, which is now the location of the Fabergé Museum;
- the manor of Pargolovo near Saint Petersburg.

Through marriage, the Shuvalovs also acquired property in Courland, including Rundale Palace, which was originally built for Ernst Johann von Biron.

=== Gallery ===
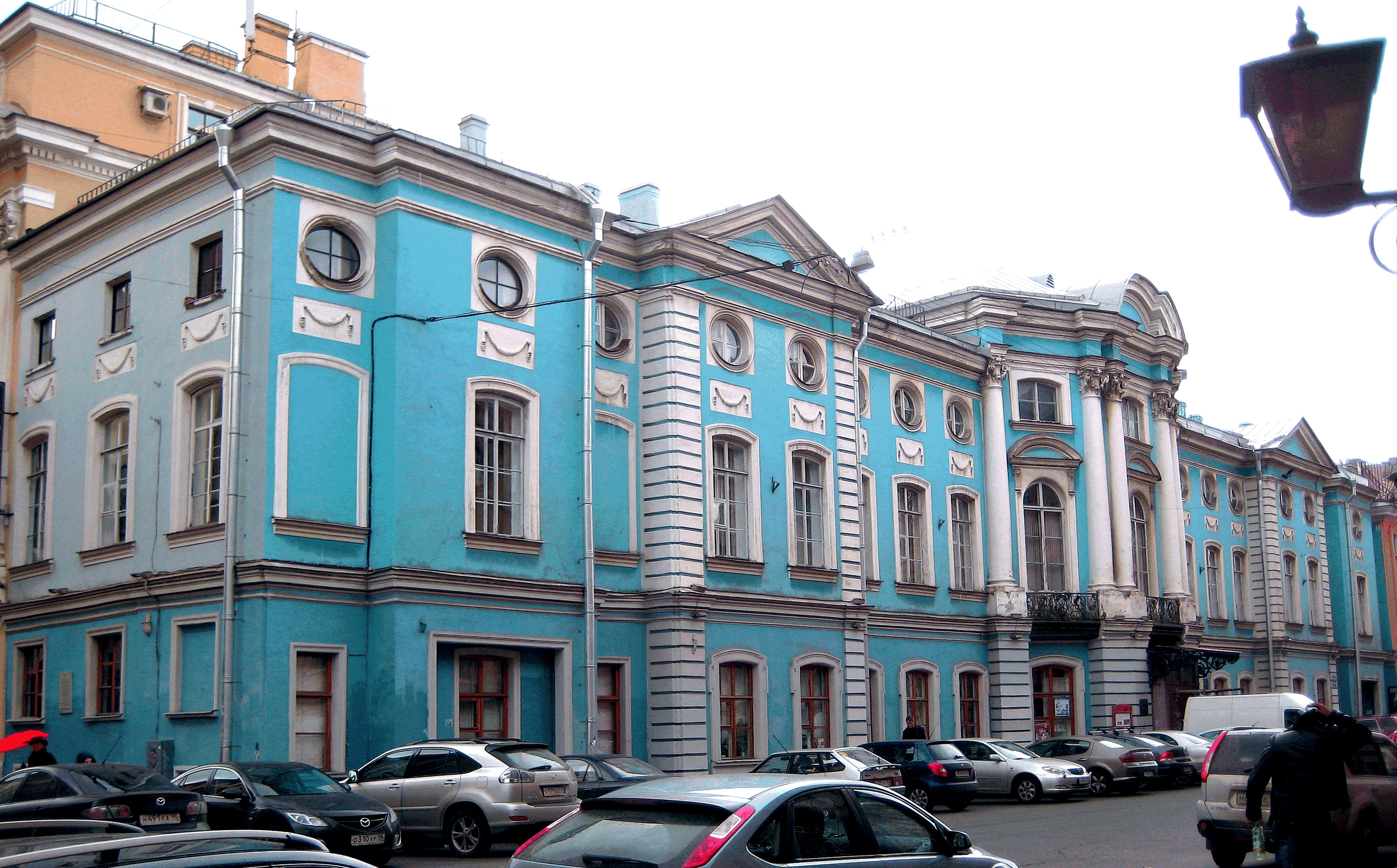
Shuvalov Mansion in Saint Petersburg

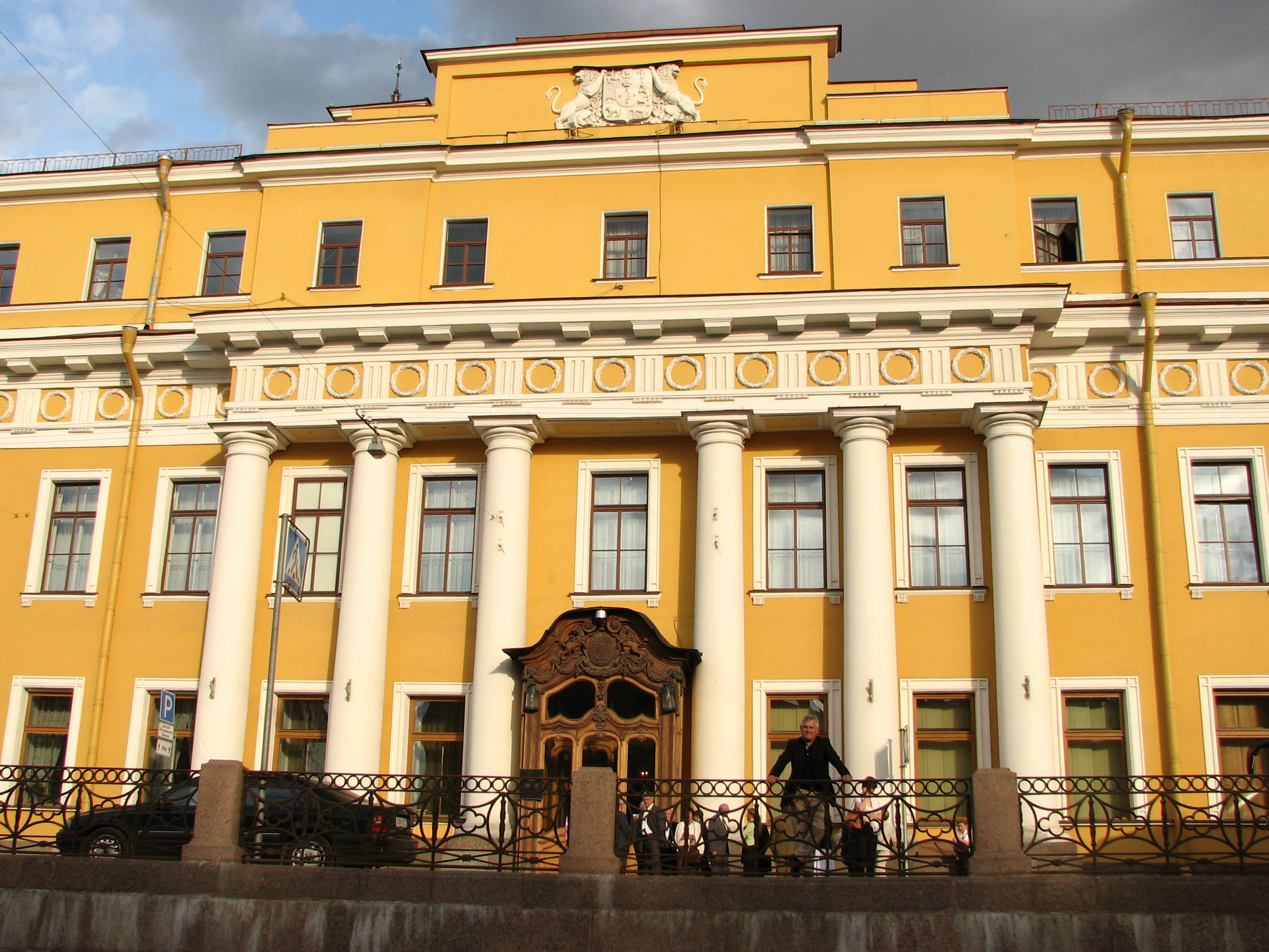
Moika Palace in Saint Petersburg

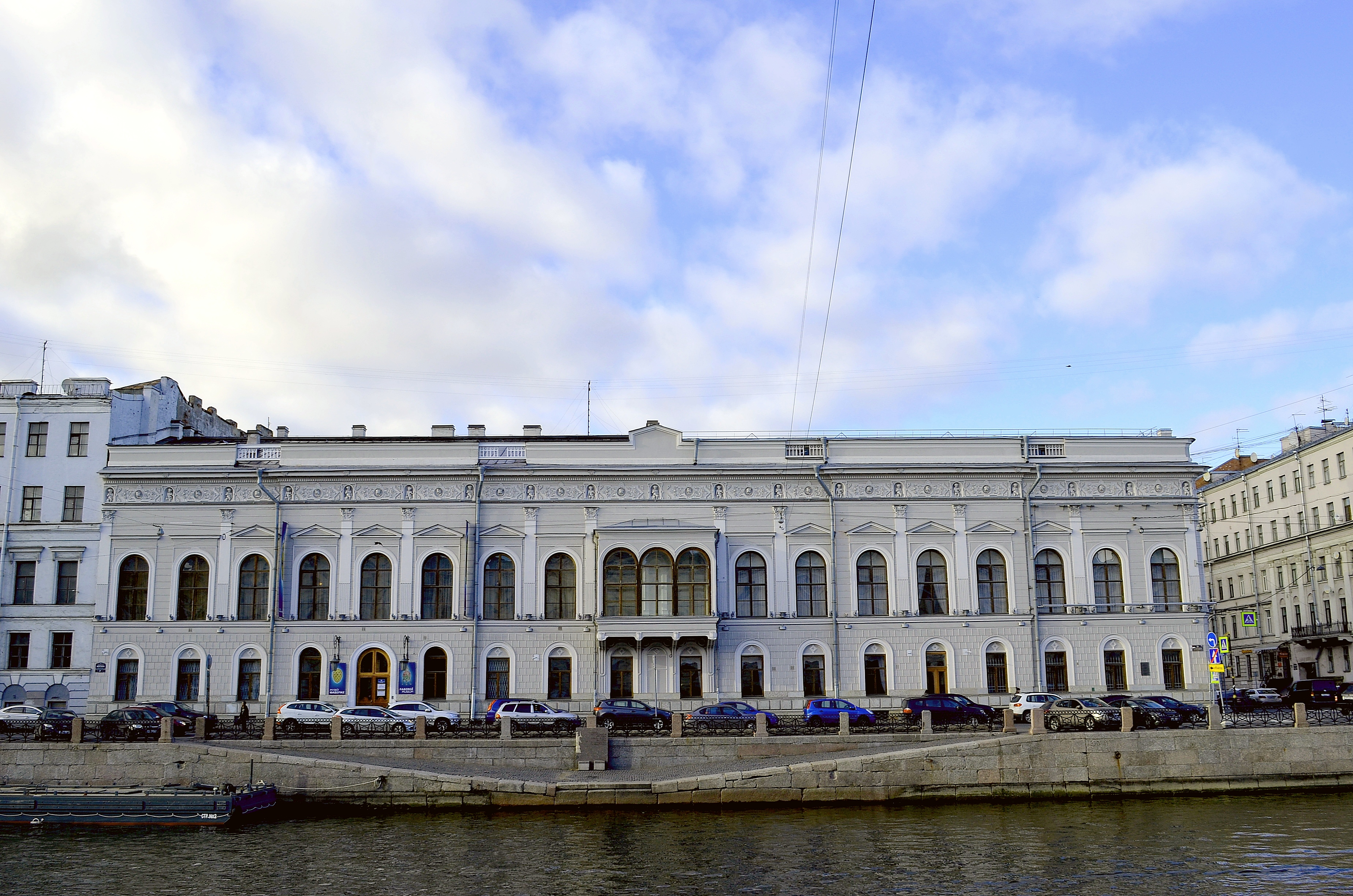
Naryshkin-Shuvalov Palace in St. Petersburg

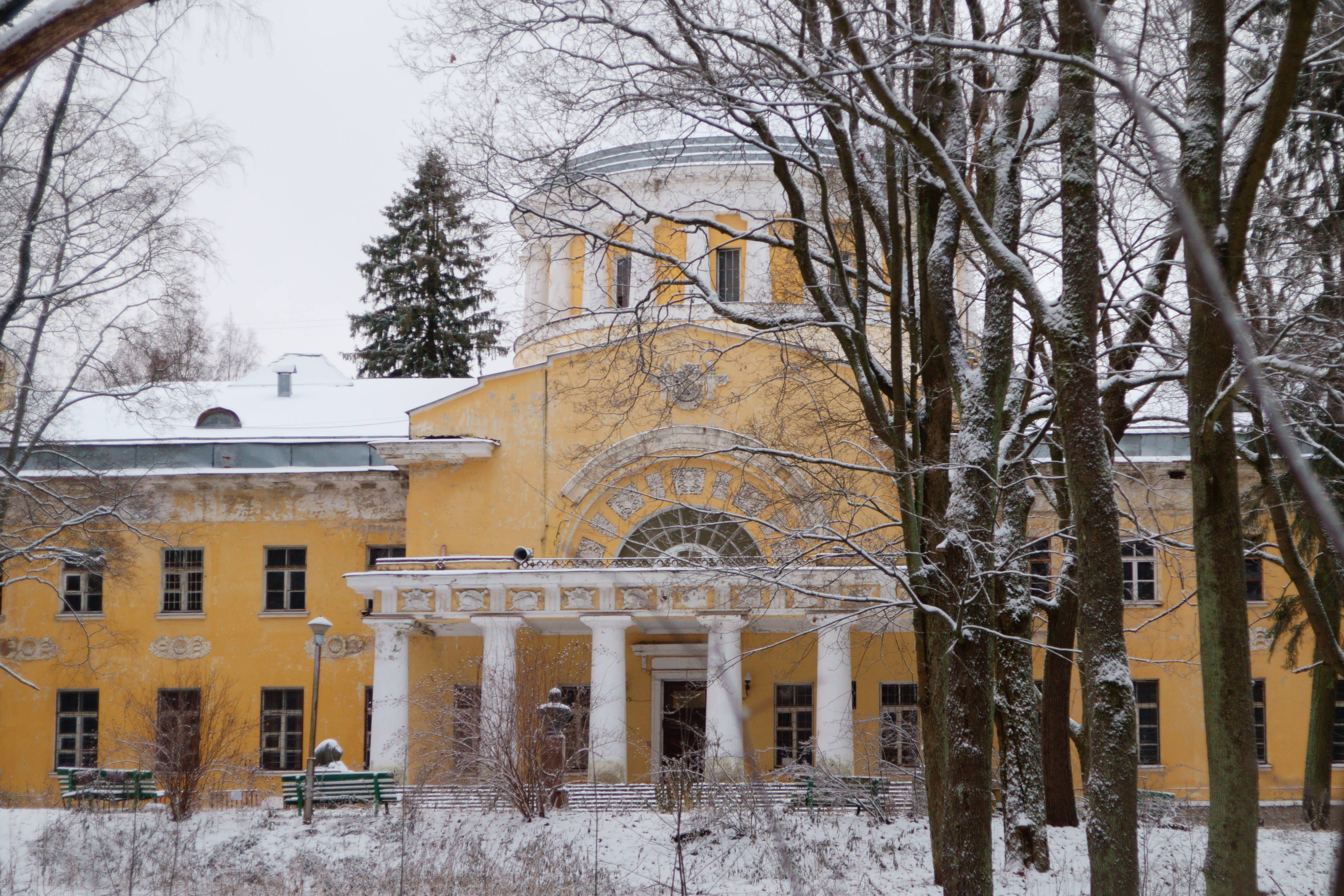
Shuvalov manor in Pargolovo

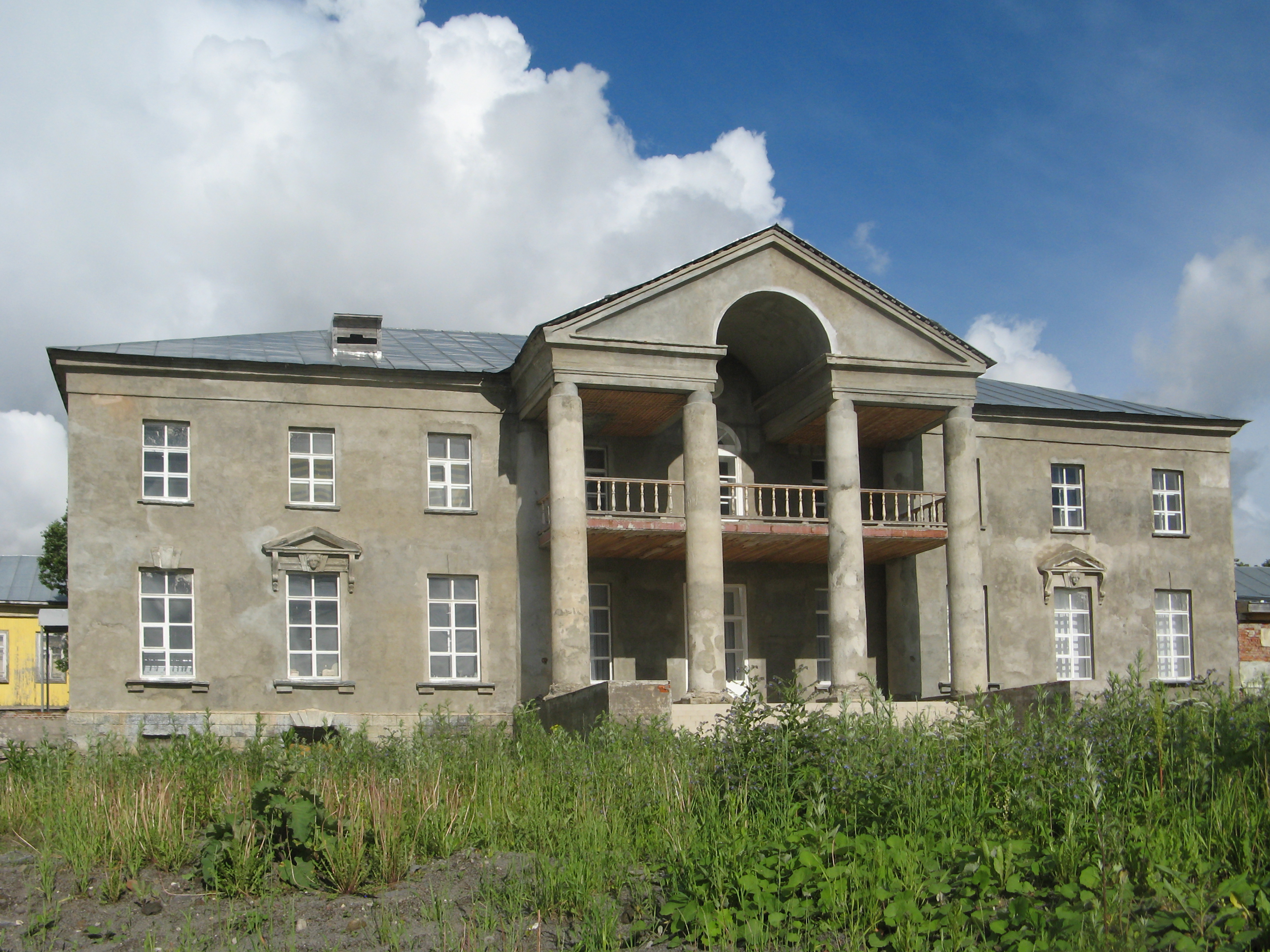
Shuvalov house in Lysva

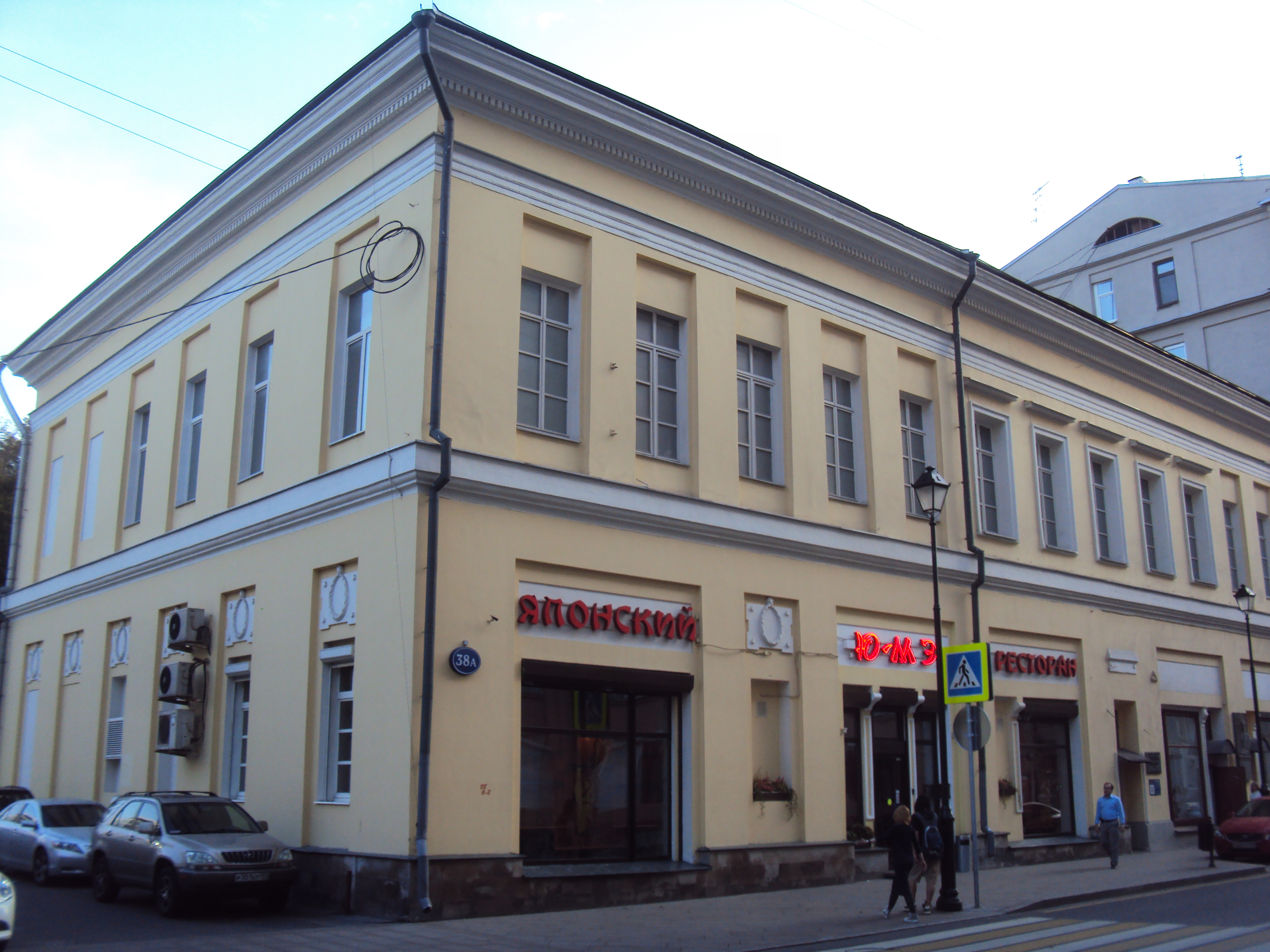
Shuvalov residence in Moscow

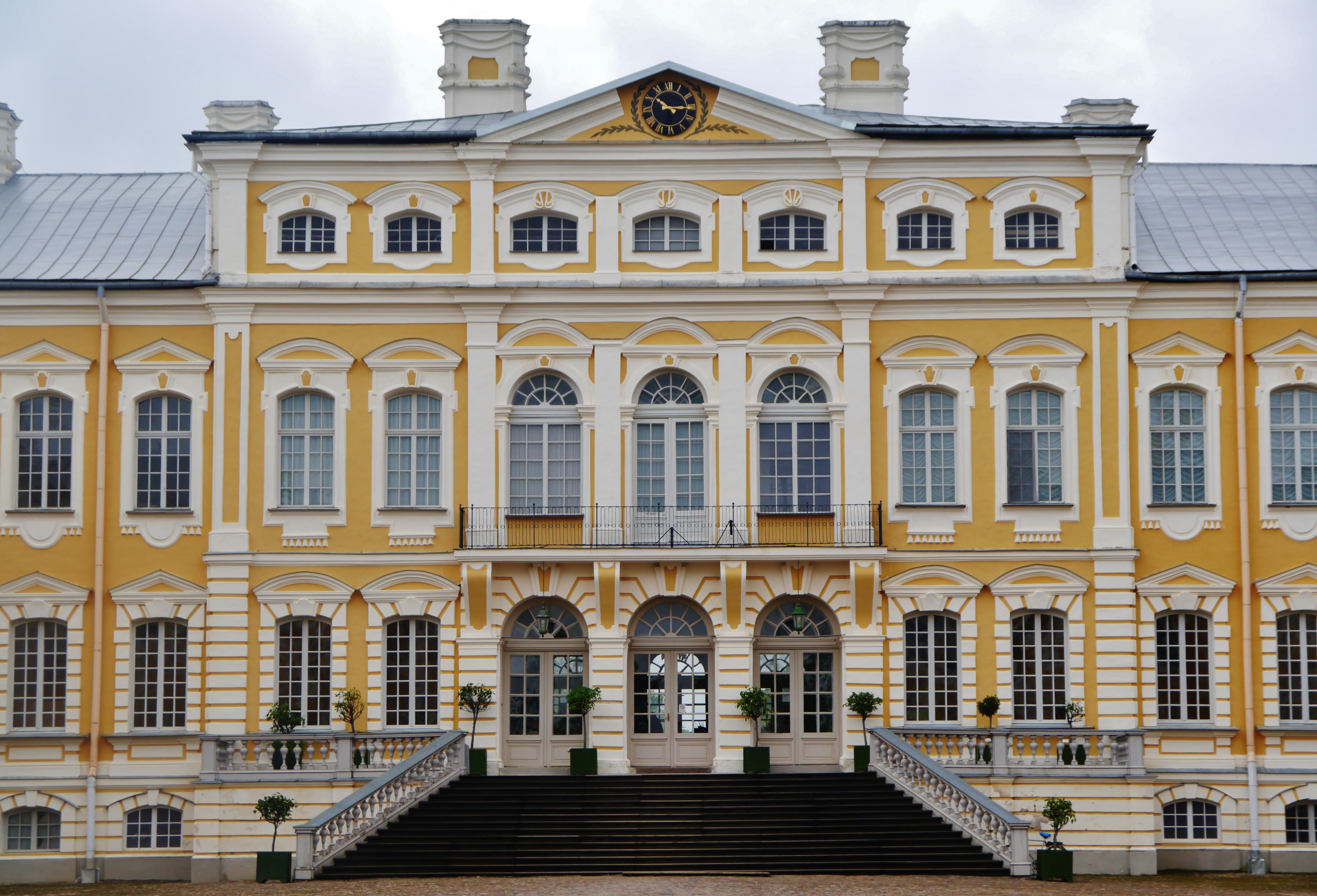
Rundale Palace in Latvia
