= Shuvalov Palace =

Coordinates: 59°56′04.9″N 30°20′35.1″E

Naryshkin-Shuvalov Palace
- Дворец Нарышкиных-Шуваловых
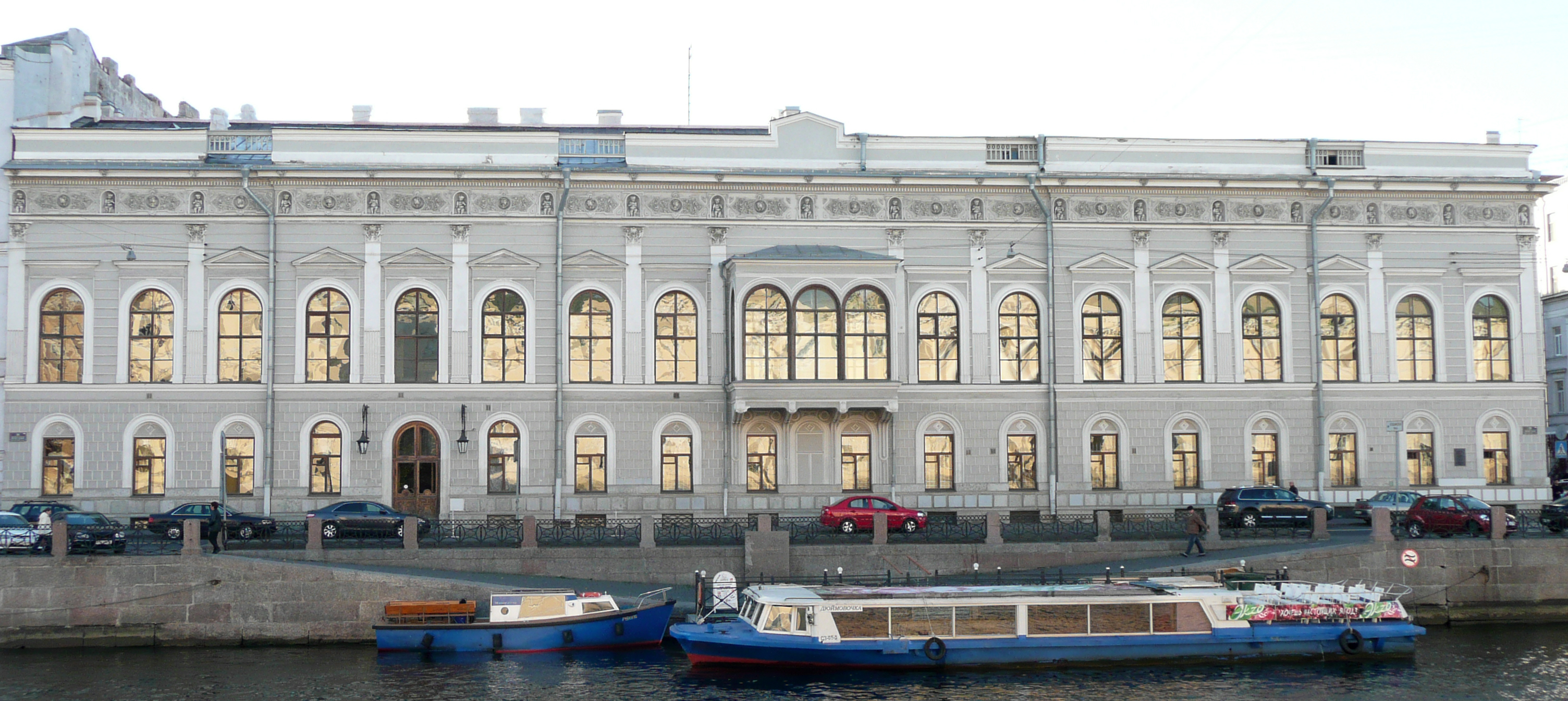
- Main frontage on the Fontanka Embankment
- Interactive map of the Naryshkin-Shuvalov Palace area

General information
- Architectural style: Neoclassical
- Location: 21 Fontanka Embankment (at Italyanskaya Street), Saint Petersburg, Russia
- Current tenants: Fabergé Museum
- Named for: Naryshkin and Shuvalov families
- Construction started: 1780s
- Renovated: 1844–1859; 2006–2012

Design and construction
- Architect: Giacomo Quarenghi (possible)

Renovating team
- Architects: Bernard de Simone, Nikolai Yefimov (1844–1859)

The Naryshkin-Shuvalov Palace (Russian: Дворец Нарышкиных-Шуваловых), also known as the Shuvalov Palace, is a Neoclassical building on the Fontanka Embankment in Saint Petersburg, Russia. Once home to the noble Naryshkin and Shuvalov families, the palace has housed the Fabergé Museum since 2013. This building should not be confused with the Shuvalov Mansion nearby at 25 Italyanskaya Street.

== History ==
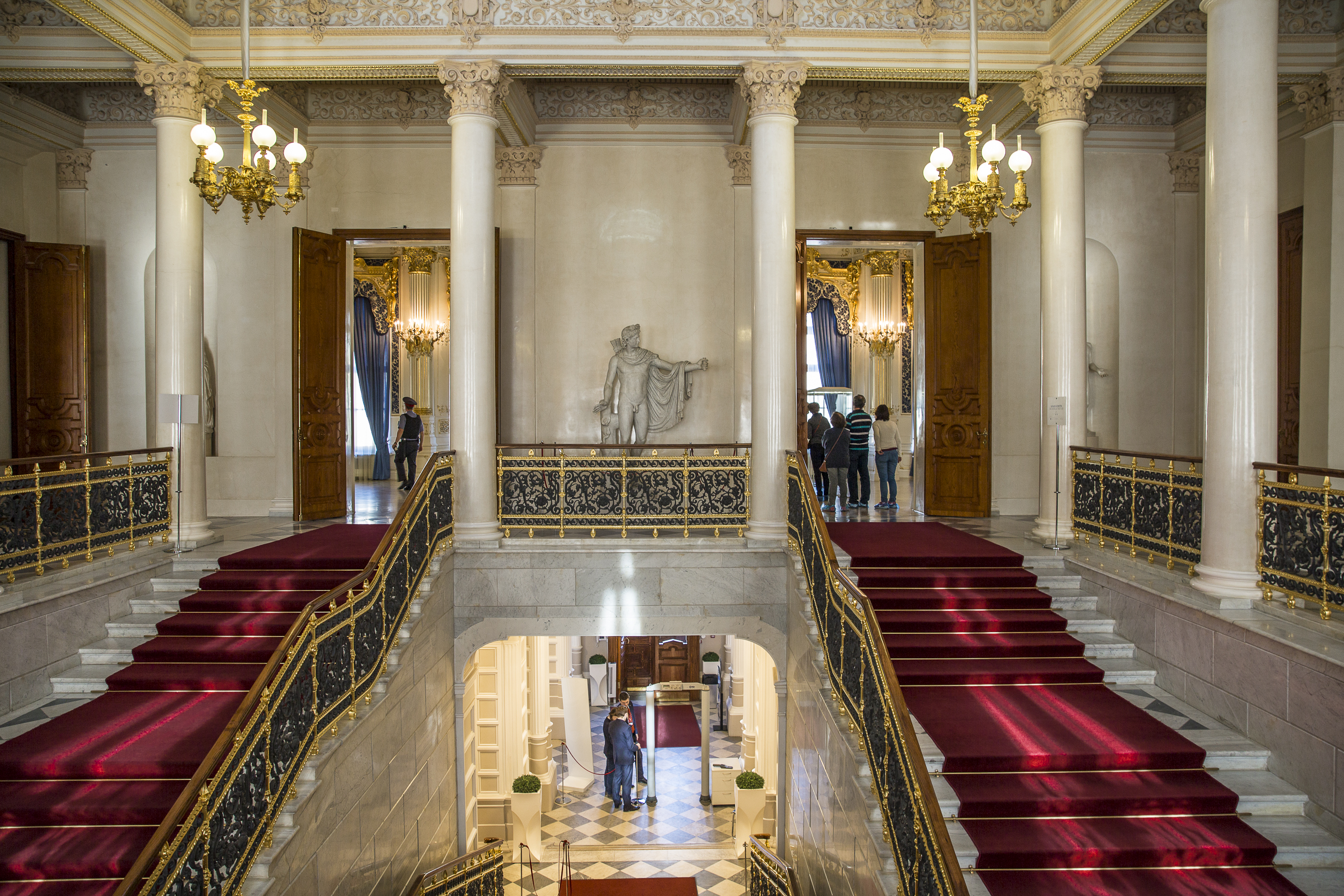
The palace's main staircase in 2015

=== Private ownership ===
The details of the construction are unknown, but the Naryshkin-Shuvalov Palace was constructed in the late 18th century, possibly to a design by Italian architect Giacomo Quarenghi. The first owners of the palace were the Count and Countess Vorontsov.

In 1799, Maria Naryshkina, born Princess Maria Czetwertyńska-Światopełk (who was a Polish noble and was for 13 years the mistress of Tsar Alexander I) purchased the palace. Her husband, Dmitri Lvovich Naryshkin, filled it with spectacular art and marble sculptures, as well as antiquities including gems, coins, and weapons. The palace became the center of the Saint Petersburg society, and its grand ballroom — also known as the Alexandrovsky or White Column Hall — played host to society balls of up to 1,000 people. The most famous ball was held on 29 April [O.S. 17 April] 1834 to celebrate the 16th birthday of the tsarevich Alexander Nikolaevich, the future Emperor Alexander II.

In 1844, the palace underwent extensive renovation for the wedding of Sofia Lvovna Naryshkina, the only daughter of Lev Naryshkin and Olga Potocka, to Count Pyotr Pavlovich Shuvalov. After the 1846 wedding, the palace became known as the Naryshkin-Shuvalov Palace. The renovation of the Naryshkin-Shuvalov Palace would continue until 1859, during which time it was redone in a neo-Renaissance style by the French architect Bernard de Simone and Russian Nikolai Yefimovich Yefimov.

When World War I began in 1914, the last owner of the palace, Yelizaveta Vladimirovna Shuvalova, donated the house to be used as a military hospital for wounded soldiers. The great ballroom was used as an officer's ward. After the Russian Revolution in 1917, the Shuvalov Palace was nationalized on 1 August 1918.

=== Soviet era ===
After the Revolution, the palace's celebrated artwork and antiquities were strategically hidden in secret hiding spots. The first items were discovered in 1919 when the World War I infirmary was removed. A large pantry was discovered under the fireplace in the "Blue Room," containing paintings, porcelain and Limoges enamel.

From 1919 to 1925, the "Museum of Aristocratic Life" operated in the palace. Following the closing of the museum, the majority of the Shuvalov collections were transferred to the Hermitage Museum and the Russian Museum, while some of the items remained in the museum fund.

The palace then served as a print house followed by a design institute in the 1930s. During the Siege of Leningrad, shelling and bombing heavily damaged the palace. On 14 September 1941, a bomb completely destroyed the courtyard wing. An incendiary bomb caused even greater damage when it went through the roof into the attic above the Alexander Hall, starting a devastating fire that caused the roof to collapse.
