= Ivan Shuvalov =

Russian minister of education

His Excellency Ivan Shuvalov
- Иван Шувалов
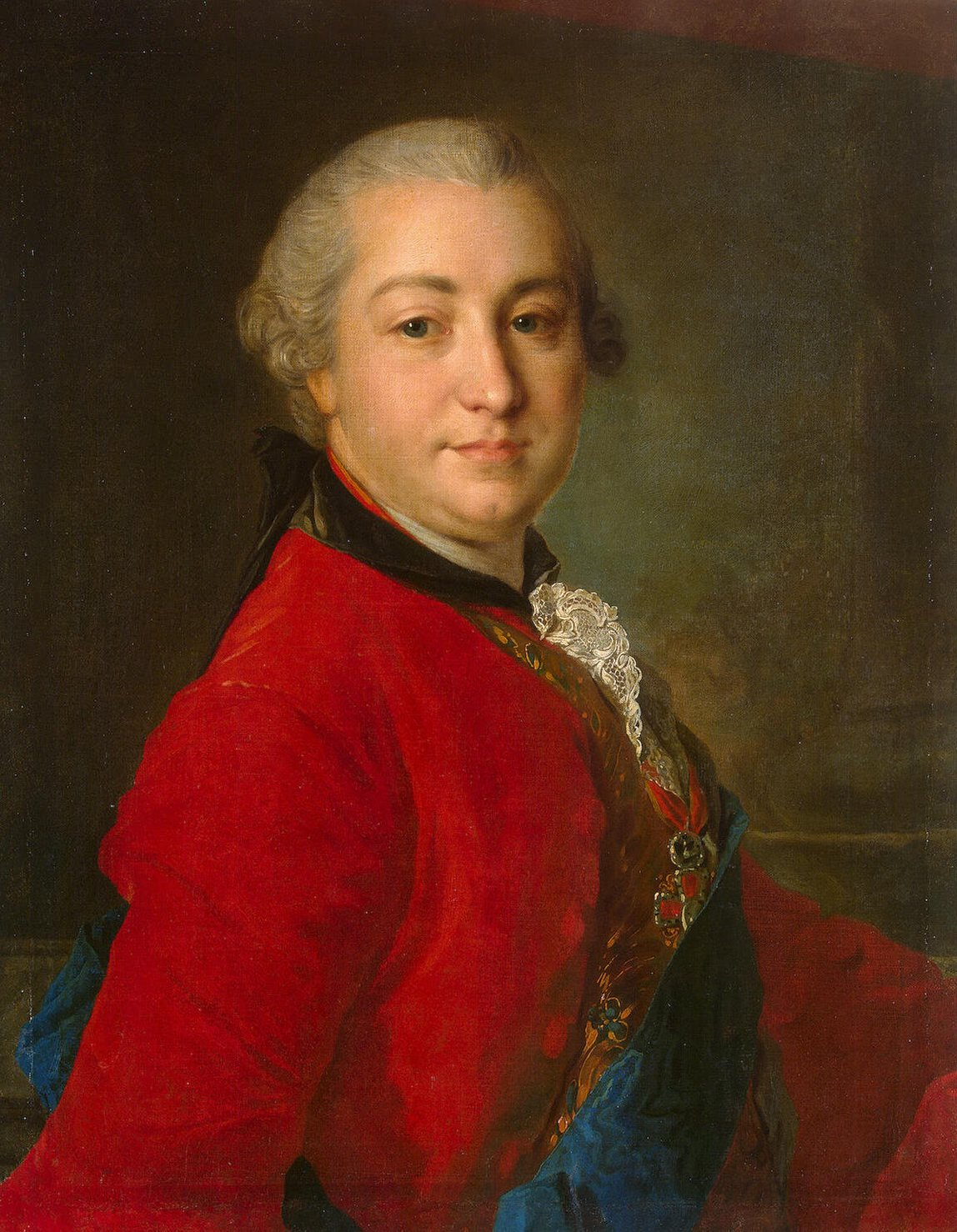
- Ivan Shuvalov in 1760
- Born: 12 November 1727; Moscow, Russian Empire
- Died: 26 November 1797 (aged 70); Shuvalov Mansion, Saint Petersburg
- Occupation: Minister of education
- Partner: Empress Elizabeth Petrovna
- Family: Shuvalov
- Honours: Order of St. Alexander Nevsky (1751); Order of St. Vladimir 1st Class (1782); Order of St. Andrew the First-Called (1782)

1st Curator of Imperial Moscow University
- In office 1755–1797
- Monarchs: Elizabeth Petrovna; Peter III; Catherine II

1st Senior Director of Imperial Academy of Arts
- In office 1757–1763
- Monarchs: Elizabeth Petrovna; Peter III; Catherine II
- Succeeded by: Ivan Ivanovich Betskoy

Senior Director of the First Cadet Corps
- In office 1763–1767
- Monarch: Catherine II
- Preceded by: Yakov Larionovich Brandt

Military service
- Rank: Lieutenant-general

Ivan Ivanovich Shuvalov (Russian: Иван Иванович Шувалов; 1 November 1727 – 26 November 1797) was called the Maecenas (patron) of the Russian Enlightenment, the first Russian Minister of Education and Active Privy Councillor (1773). Russia's first theatre, university, and academy of arts were instituted with his active participation. A favorite of Elizaveta Petrovna of Russia and a friend of the scientist M.V. Lomonosov.

== Love affair with the Empress ==
He was born in Moscow, the only son of Ivan Menshoi Shuvalov, an army captain who died when the boy was ten, and Tatiana Rodionovna. The Shuvalov family fortunes changed drastically in 1741, when Empress Elizabeth Petrovna ascended to the Russian throne with help from Ivan's powerful cousins – Peter Shuvalov and Alexander Shuvalov. The following year, they had the fourteen-year-old Ivan attached to the imperial court as a page.

In July 1749, when Ivan was visiting his brother-in-law Prince Galitzine at his country estate near Moscow, the Shuvalov brothers arranged his meeting with the Empress, who was making a pilgrimage to the Monastery of St. Sabbas. The Shuvalovs were not disappointed in their calculations: the 40-year-old Empress took notice of the handsome page, who was 18 years her junior, and bid him accompany her in the upcoming pilgrimage to the New Jerusalem Monastery.

Three months later, Shuvalov was appointed a gentleman-in-waiting, and his liaison with the Empress began. Although the cousins planned to use him as a pawn in their court intrigues, Shuvalov refused to get enmeshed in their machinations. As his biographers like to point out, Shuvalov was "mild and generous to all" and "had no enemies whatsoever".

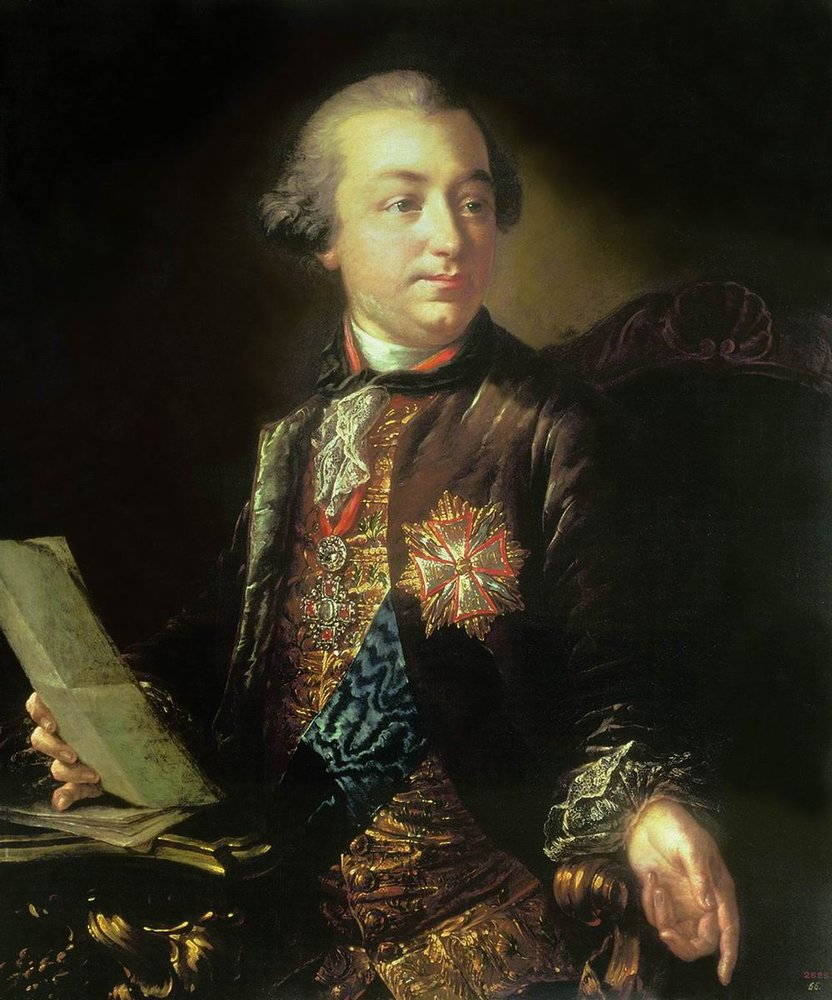
Ivan Shuvalov by Anton Losenko

His position at court grew stronger during Elizabeth's declining years, when he served as a virtual master of petitions to her, eclipsing her previous favourite and rumoured husband, Aleksey Razumovsky. Promoted general in 1760, Shuvalov refused most other honours that the Empress wished to bestow upon him, including the title of count.

== Patronage of Lomonosov ==
Unlike the self-seeking favourites of Catherine the Great, Shuvalov determined to put his good fortune to constructive use for the advancement of education and the promotion of fine arts in his country. A model of the enlightened courtier, he maintained correspondence with the leading French thinkers – Helvetius, d'Alembert, Diderot, and Voltaire. He supplied the latter with materials necessary for his Histoire de l'empire de Russie sous Pierre le Grand and was later instrumental in publishing it in Russia.

Shuvalov's activity brought him in touch with Mikhail Lomonosov, a Russian scholar who aspired to establish a university in Russia. Lomonosov found a loyal patron in Shuvalov and paid tribute to his accomplishments in his dedication of a couple of odes and "meditations" to him. On 23 January 1755 – the name-day of Shuvalov's mother Tatiana Rodionovna – the Empress endorsed their project to set up the Imperial Moscow University "for all sorts and conditions of people". Tatiana Day is still celebrated in Russia as "Students Day" (now falling on 25 January because of the increased difference between the Julian and Gregorian calendars).

Shuvalov became the university's first curator and attracted the finest scholars to teach there. He came up with the idea of establishing The Moscow News (Московские ведомости), a newspaper published by the university press, which was also founded at Shuvalov's instigation. Apart from two colleges affiliated with Moscow University, he also helped establish the first Russian college outside Moscow – in Kazan. He was elected a Fellow of the Royal Society in 1758.

== Academy of Arts ==
In 1757, Shuvalov submitted to the Governing Senate his project for establishing the Academy of Three Noble Arts at his own palace in Saint Petersburg. This institution – later transformed into the Imperial Academy of Arts – was envisioned by him for the education of the most gifted boys from all strata of society. At first no formal examination was required to enter the Academy; even peasants' children – like Fyodor Rokotov and Fedot Shubin – were admitted on Shuvalov's personal recommendation.

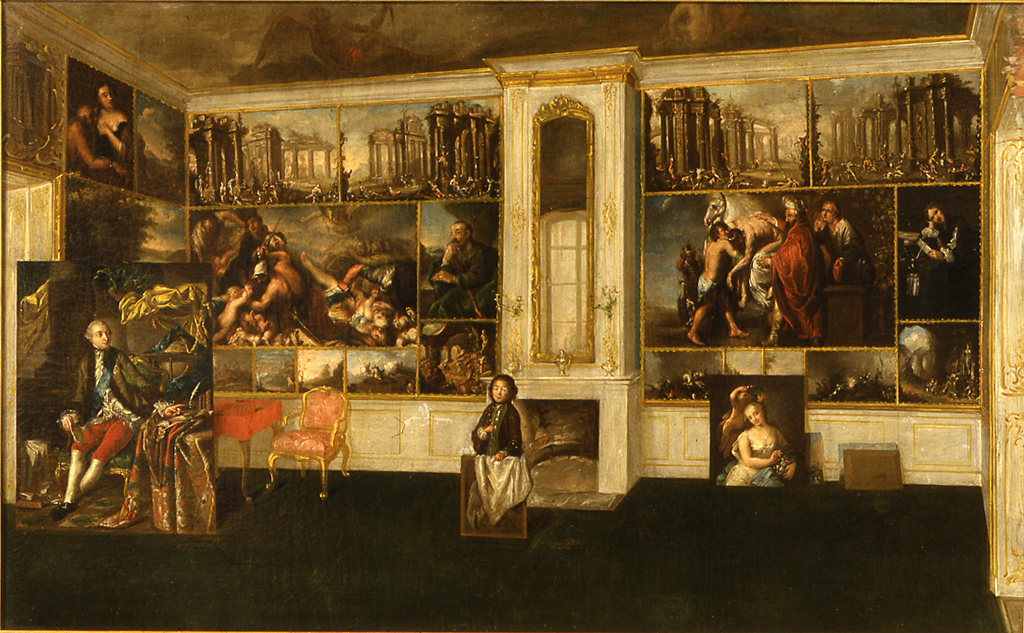
View of Ivan Shuvalov's art gallery.

Shuvalov served as the Academy's first president until 1763, when he was succeeded by Ivan Betskoy. In 1758, he donated to the Academy his own collection of Western drawings and paintings, which formed the nucleus of its formidable holdings of fine art. At the time, his palace also hosted performances by Russia's first theatrical troupe, led by Fyodor Volkov and Ivan Dmitrievsky.

Upon Elizabeth's death and the ascension of Catherine II, Shuvalov set off for Europe, ostensibly with the purpose of improving his frail health. During fourteen years of foreign travels, he acquired choice works of art for the Academy and the Hermitage Museum. He also commissioned copies of the finest Roman sculptures in Rome, Florence and Naples and later presented these to the Academy of Arts.

== Later years ==
As regards politics, Shuvalov's life abroad was not as exciting as the previous period of his career. On Catherine II's request, he would go on diplomatic errands; thus it was he who persuaded Pope Pius VI to replace Durini, a Russophobic nuncio at Warsaw, with the more pliant Count Giuseppe Garampi.

His eventual return to Russia in 1777 occasioned Derzhavin's well-known epistle, while the Empress made him High Chamberlain. Shuvalov's mansion was to be frequented by the new generation of Russian intellectuals: Ekaterina Dashkova, Denis Fonvizin, Mikhail Kheraskov, Ivan Dmitriev, and Aleksandr Shishkov – many of them products of the university he had established. While living at his palace, the poet Ermil Kostrov produced the first Russian translation of the Iliad.

After his imperial lover's demise, Shuvalov never married and had no children. He died at the Shuvalov Mansion in Saint Petersburg on 14 November 1797. His tomb is in the Annunciation Church of the Alexander Nevsky Monastery. In 2003, a memorial statue of Shuvalov was unveiled in the inner court of the Academy of Arts in St. Petersburg. Its sculptor is Zurab Tsereteli, the current president of the Academy that Shuvalov founded. Another commemorative statue was erected in front of the Moscow State University Library in 2004.

== Bibliography ==
- Pavel Bartenev. Ivan Ivanovich Shuvalov: A Biography. Moscow, 1857.
- Ivan Ivanovich Shuvalov (1727–1797): prosveshchonnaya lichnost' v rossiiskoi istorii. SPb, 1998.
- Zinko, M. A. (2023). "ШУВАЛОВ ИВАН ИВАНОВИЧ". Great Russian Encyclopedia. Electronic version.
