= Savva Chevakinsky =

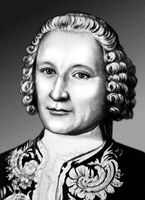
Savva Chevakinsky

Savva Ivanovich Chevakinsky (Russian: Савва Иванович Чевакинский; 1709 – after 1774) was a Russian architect of the Baroque school. He worked in Saint Petersburg and Tsarskoye Selo.

Chevakinsky was born into a noble family in the village of Veshki in the Novotorzhsky Uyezd of Tver Governorate. In 1729 he entered the Naval Academy in Saint Petersburg, from whence he was assigned to the Izmaylovsky Life Guards Regiment in 1734. At the request of the Admiralty Board he was discharged for unauthorized absence from the Academy and apprenticed to the architectural company of Ivan Korobov, under whose direction he worked for seven years.

In 1739 Chevakinsky began his independent career. From 1741 to 1767 he was chief architect for the Admiralty Board. From 1745 to 1760 he was an architect at Tsarskoye Selo, supervising the reconstruction of the Catherine Palace and surrounding Catherine Park. Here Chevakinsky erected two buildings (a church and a hall) connected by galleries to the central part of the palace, erected the Monbizhu pavilion (which housed palace officials), and participated in the creation of the Hermitage pavilion.

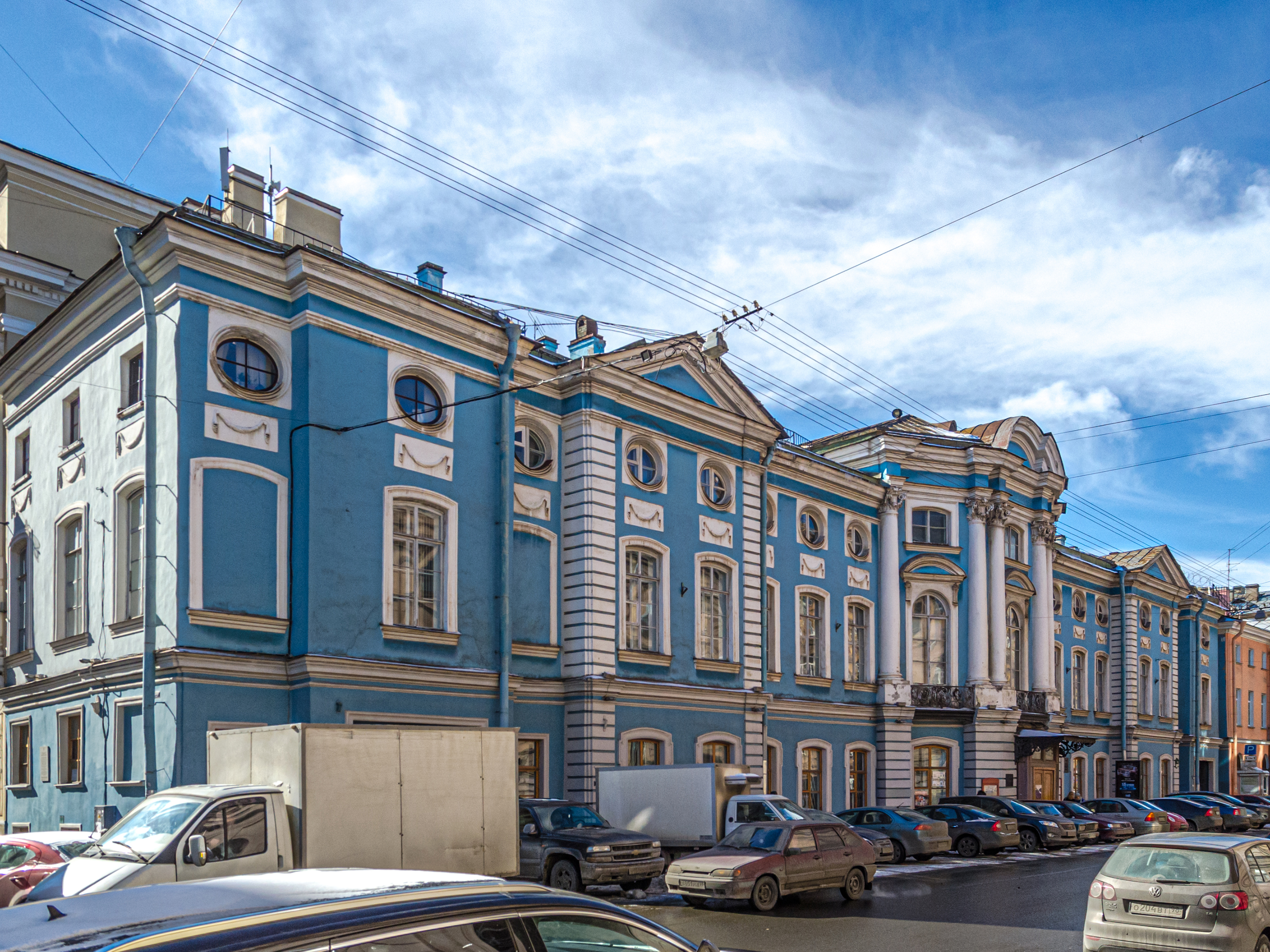
The Shuvalov Mansion, at the junction of Malaya Sadovaya Street and Italyanskaya Street

Chevakinsky's largest building in Saint Petersburg was the St. Nicholas Naval Cathedral (1753–1762) with a separate tiered bell tower (1756–1758). He also rebuilt the Kunstkamera, the museum of anthropology and ethnography established by Peter the Great.

Chevakinsky also designed large private homes. For the Sheremetev family, he built the Fountain House (1750–1755) on the Fontanka Embankment, which now houses the Anna Akhmatova Literary and Memorial Museum. For the Shuvalov family, he built a mansion at the corner of Malaya Sadovaya Street and Italyanskaya Street (1749–1756, rebuilt in the 19th century), which later housed the Imperial Ministry of Justice (1802 to 1917) and is today home to the Museum of Hygiene.

Chevakinsky also constructed the Cavalry Houses, a project commissioned by Empress Elizabeth centered on building houses that differentiated Pushkin, Saint Petersburg from the area surrounding the palace. Construction took place between 1752 and 1753.

From 1755 to 1758 Chevakinsky was an architect for the Imperial Academy of Sciences. During those years he taught Vasili Bazhenov and Ivan Starov.

According to some sources, Chevakinsky died between 1774 and 1780; according to other sources, he died in 1783.
