= Vladimir Zabugin =

Russian Catholic journalist (1880–1923)

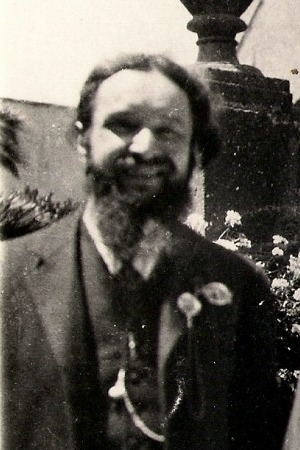
- Zabugin at his wedding in 1915
- Born: 21 June 1880; Pargolovo
- Died: 14 September 1923 (aged 43); Trentino-Alto Adige, Italy
- Known for: Roma e l'Oriente; Religious diplomacy

Vladimir Zabugin (21 June 1880, Pargolovo – 14 September 1923, Trentino-Alto Adige, Italy) was a Russian historian and publicist. He was a prominent figure in Russian Catholicism at the beginning of the 20th century.

== Life ==
Zabugin was born into a family of civil servants. In 1903, he graduated with honors from St. Petersburg State University. He was then sent to Italy to do scientific work. While there, he became interested in the Greek Catholic Church, and he talked with the monks of the Byzantine Catholic Monastery of Grottaferrata, including the abbot Antonio Pellegrini, and with a future exarch of the Russian Catholic Church, Leonid Feodorov.

In 1907, Zabugin converted to Catholicism from his native religion, Russian Orthodoxy. In 1911, he completed his doctoral thesis. After that, he worked as a professor at the University of Rome, where he taught the history of the Italian Renaissance. He published numerous papers on the history of the Renaissance and Italian humanism, where he sought to emphasize the Christian component of this cultural phenomenon. From 1910 to 1919, he worked as an editor of the journal Roma e l'Oriente (Rome and the East), which was published in the monastery of Grottaferrata. He also wrote numerous journal articles on the history of Russian Christianity, interfaith relations, and religious relations between Russia and the rest of Europe. Zabugin actively participated in the church and in the social lives of Russian Catholics in Europe, and he worked with Metropolitan Archbishop Andrey Sheptytsky. Zabugin was the author of the Russian Catholic catechism.

In June 1917, Zabugin was sent to Russia by the Italian government as a special envoy to strengthen bilateral ties. After the October Revolution, he returned to Italy, where he published Mad Giant: The Documentary Chronicles the Russian Revolution, a book about his impressions of the recent events in Russia.

Vladimir Zabugin died on 14 September 1923 in a mountaineering accident in the Alps.

== Sources ==
- «Забугин Владимир Николаевич» //Католическая энциклопедия. Т.1. М.:2003. Ст. 1875–1876
