= Cavalry Houses =

Buildings in Pushkin, Saint Petersburg, Russia

- Кавалерские дома
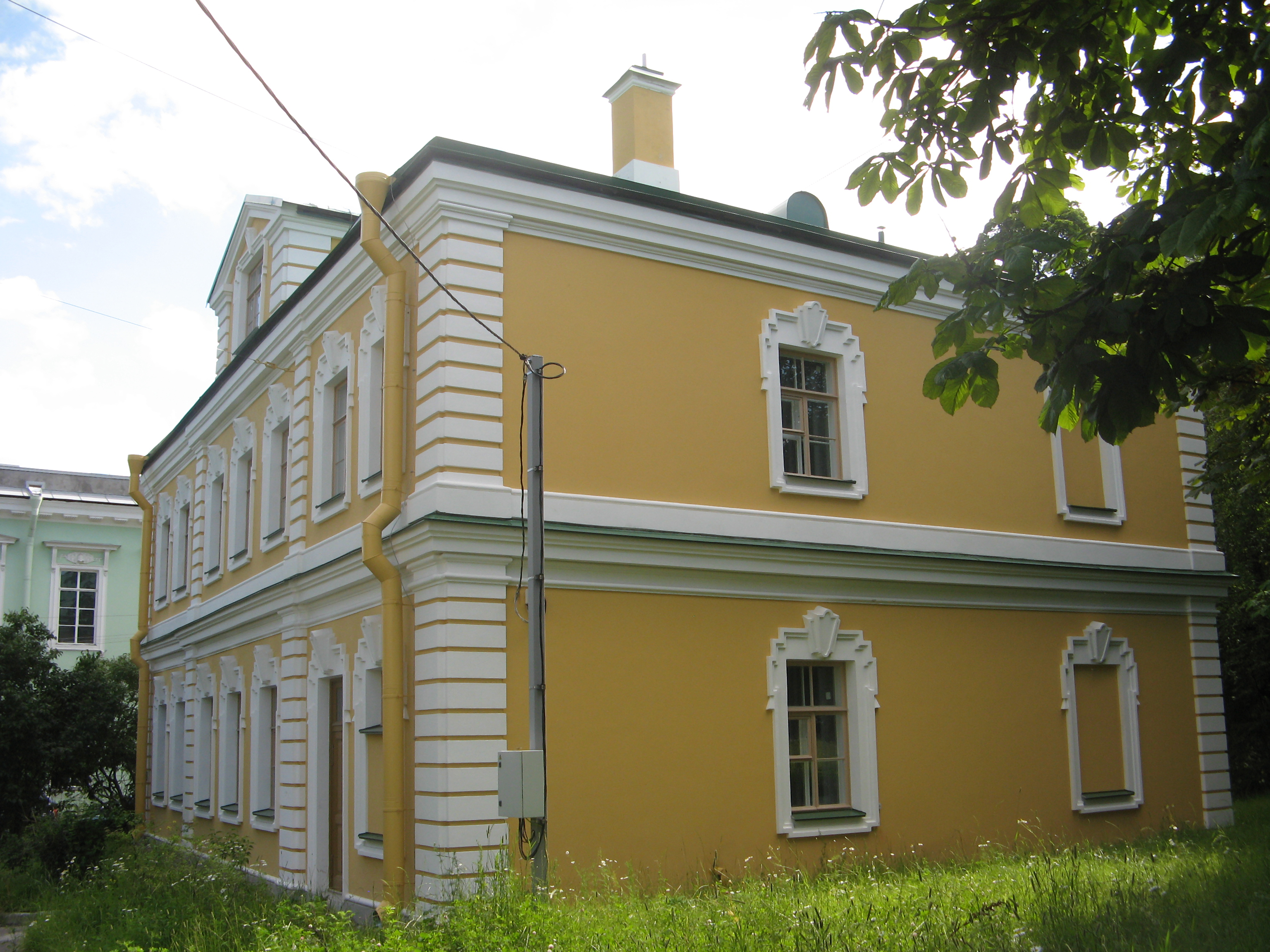
- Interactive map of the Cavalry Houses area

General information
- Architectural style: Baroque
- Location: Pushkin, 4, 6, 10, 12 Sadovaya Street
- Coordinates: 59°43′01″N 30°23′55″E
- Construction started: 1752
- Completed: 1753

Design and construction
- Architect: Savva I. Chevakinsky

The Cavalry Houses are a series of buildings built in Pushkin, Saint Petersburg, between 1752 and 1753. They are listed as a cultural heritage site.

== History ==
The Cavalry Houses were constructed as part of a project to build houses that differentiated the location from the area surrounding the palace. In 1748, Empress Elizabeth ordered the construction of four stone houses and one wooden house for the steward and the cavaliers who came to Tsarskoye Selo. The project was entrusted to the architect Savva Ivanovich Chevakinskylater.

Chevakinsky constructed the houses in the baroque style with a single story and a mezzanine. In 1784, the buildings were expanded by the architect I.V. Neyolov, who built up the mezzanines to complete second floors. The houses were later rebuilt in different styles. Of the group, the houses numbered 10 and 12 have been the most accurately preserved.

== Architecture ==
The Cavalry Houses were designed in a style that is typical of the Saint Petersburg urban development houses in the mid-18th century. These houses were styled after imperial residences. One distinctive characteristic is the rustled shoulder blades, which highlight the corners and the central parts of the houses' facades. Decorative locking window frames adorn the windows on both floors, and the floors are separated by wide profiled traction.

== Sources ==
- "Садовая 4, 6, 10, 12. Кавалерские дома". Энциклопедия Царского Села. Archived from the original on October 11, 2017.
- "Кавалерский дом - Дом директора Лицея". citywalls.ru.
