= Malaya Sadovaya (painting) =

1979 painting by Alexander Semionov

Malaya Sadovaya street
- Artist: Alexander M. Semionov
- Year: 1979
- Type: Oil on board
- Dimensions: 70 cm × 60 cm (28 in × 24 in)
- Location: private collection; Russia

Malaya Sadovaya Street is a 1979 oil painting by the Russian artist Alexander Semionov, depicting Malaya Sadovaya Street in Leningrad on rainy day of the end of the 1970s. This cityscape was painted in traditions of the Leningrad School of Painting and Soviet figurative painting of late socialist realism with their typical synthesis of realistic and impressionistic traditions to create an image of modernity.

== History ==
The painting is of special importance to the artistic reputation of Alexander Semionov. Created on the apex of his artistic career, five years before his death, the depiction of it became one of his most famous works. In the painting Semionov convincingly conveyed a sense of time and place, the unhurried flow of Leningrad life.

In the late 1970s Alexander Semionov was a recognized master of the Leningrad landscape, with his recognizable handwriting. This genre took a leading place in his work in the 1960s. The artist invariably painted his works from nature as sketches-pictures, seeking the transmission of a live direct impression, working with both brush and palette knife.

Semionov liked to painted the city in rainy weather, doing it with a special mood, masterfully passing the game of reflections on the wet asphalt, the shiny roofs of buses and cars, pedestrians under umbrellas, which are so consonant with our image of the city on the Neva. This theme was developed by him for decades and is reflected in the works Rainy Day (1958), Rainy Day in the Summer Garden (1961), On the Palace Square, On Kirov Prospekt (both 1965), Nevsky Prospekt (1977), Nevsky Prospekt in the Rain (1983), and others.

In 1979, in Leningrad, with great success, the first solo exhibition of the works of Semionov was held. Most of the works shown at the exhibition belonged to the genre of the urban lyrical landscape. The warm response that met his creativity, inspired the artist; he experienced a need to express himself and his attitude towards Leningrad in new forms.

== Showing and publications ==
In the early 1980s a reproduction of Malaya Sadovaya Street was printed by the state publishing house "Artist of the RSFSR" for mass distribution in the USSR.

After Semionov's death in 1984, the painting was kept by the artist's widow, and in the early 1990s was sold into a private collection.

Malaya Sadovaya Street was exhibited for the first time in 1987 at a posthumous exhibition of works by Alexander Semionov in the exhibition halls of the Leningrad Union of Artists. Then the painting was shown in towns of the Leningrad region. In 1994 the work was again exhibited in the exhibition halls of the Leningrad Union of Artists in the art show Paintings of 1950-1980s by the Leningrad School Artists.

In 1996 the painting was exhibited at the art show Paintings of 1940-1990s: The Leningrad School, in Saint Petersburg in the Nikolay Nekrasov Memorial Museum. The painting was also reproduced on the cover of the exhibition catalog of the 1996 show.

In 2005, the American company Soicher-Marin, Inc. released a poster with a picture of Malaya Sadovaya Street, distributed in the US and around the world.

In 2007, the picture was reproduced in the book Unknown Socialist Realism: The Leningrad School. It was also reproduced on the dust jacket of the book.

In 2012, the painting was exhibited in St. Petersburg at the Anniversary Exhibition 80 Years of the St. Petersburg Union of Artists at the Central Exhibition Hall "Manege" and was reproduced in the exhibition catalog.

In 2014, Malaya Sadovaya Street was published in an article by Sergey Ivanov on the artist's creation in the two-volume reference and bibliographical collection Pages of Memory.

== Sources ==
- Alexander Mikhailovich Semionov. Exhibition of works of art. Leningrad, Leningrad Union of Artists, 1987.
- Paintings of 1950-1980s by the Leningrad School's artists. Exhibition catalogue. Saint Petersburg, Saint Petersburg Union of artists, 1994.
- Paintings of 1940-1990s from the Leningrad School. Exhibition catalogue. Saint Petersburg, Nikolai Nekrasov Memorial Museum, 1996.
- А. Цыганов. Чтобы собирать такие картины, надо быть немного романтиком. Невское время, 13 марта 1996.
- Федоров С. Весна в городе и натюрморт с вербами. Смена, 6 марта 1996.
- Sergei V. Ivanov. Unknown Socialist Realism. The Leningrad School. Saint Petersburg, NP-Print Edition, 2007. P.56.
- Иванов С. В. О ленинградских пейзажах Александра Семёнова. // Петербургские искусствоведческие тетради. Вып. 23. СПб, 2012. С.43–46.
- Семёнов А. М. Малая Садовая. 1979 // 80 Лет Санкт-Петербургскому Союзу художников. Юбилейная выставка. СПб, 2012. С.212.
