= Fontanka Embankment =

Embankment in Saint Petersburg, Russia along the Fontanka river

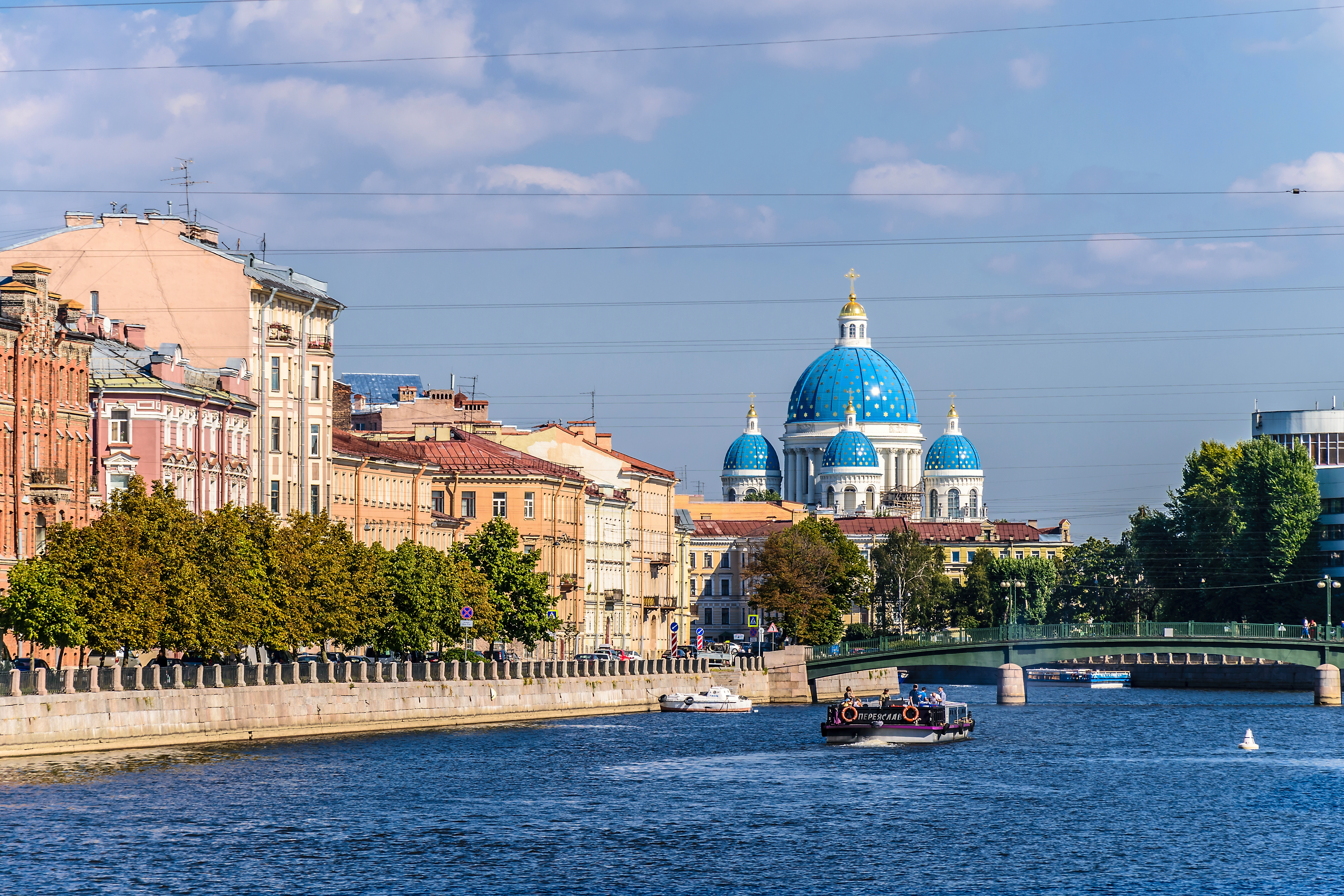
- The Trinity Cathedral from the Fontanka Embankment
- Native name: Набережная реки Фонтанки (Russian)
- Type: embankment
- Location: Saint Petersburg
- Coordinates: 59°55′50″N 30°20′21″E

The Fontanka Embankment (Russian: Набережная реки Фонтанки) is a street in Saint Petersburg, Russia, that follows the course of the Fontanka from its origin as it diverges from the Neva River up to its confluence with the Great Neva. In 1762–1769 the general plan of city development was developed by the State Special Committee, headed by Aleksei Kvasov. Following this plan, in the 1780s the shores were embanked in granite by architect Giacomo Quarenghi. The Fontanka Embankment was used as a border of Saint Petersburg central part.

Nowadays the embankment serves as a motorway, it was reconstructed in the early 1990s, then in 2016–2019. It has a status of cultural heritage object. The total length of the left side embankment is 6.4 km, right - 5.7 km. Numerous palaces and historical sites are located on this street.

== Landmarks and notable buildings ==
- The Summer Garden.
- Saint Michael's Castle, built in 1797-1801 by Vasily Bazhenov and Vincenzo Brenna for Emperor Paul I.
- No. 2 – the mansion of Friedrich Wilhelm Bauer.
- No. 3 – former Ciniselli Circus, built in 1876-1877 by Vasily Kenel; currently the St Petersburg State Circus.
- No. 6 – the Imperial School of Jurisprudence, rebuilt in 1835 by Vasily Stasov from senator Ivan Nepluev's mansion.
- No. 16 – the building was constructed by Auguste de Montferrand for chancellor Viktor Kochubey in the early 19th century. After his death the Special Corps of Gendarmes moved into the house. In the 20th century, after the Russian Revolution, the building was used as a city courthouse.
- No. 18 – Pashkov house, built in 1836 by Alberto Cavos.
- No. 20 – Nekludov house, built in 1787—1790 by architect Fyodor Demertzov. In 1812—1824 the palace served as a residence of Alexander Nikolaevich Golitsyn.
- No. 21 – the Naryshkin-Shuvalov Palace, constructed in the late 18th century by Giacomo Quarenghi.
- No. 34 – the Fountain House, built in 1712, later reconstructed several times by the leading Russian architects, such as Savva Chevakinsky, Andrey Voronikhin, Giacomo Quarenghi, Ivan Starov. Since 1989 the Anna Akhmatova Literary and Memorial Museum is located in the South wing.
- No. 36 – the former Catherine Institute. The finishing school was established by Empress Maria Feodorovna in 1798 and initially housed in front of the Tauride Palace. Later Alexander I of Russia granted the Institute some lands on the Fontanka Embankment, where in 1804—1807 Giacomo Quarenghi constructed the marvellous palace in Neoclassical style.
- No. 39 – the Anichkov Palace, built in 1741-1753 by Francesco Bartolomeo Rastrelli for Empress Elizabeth Petrovna.
- No. 42 (Nevsky Prospekt, 41) – the Beloselsky-Belozersky Palace, built in 1847-1848 by Andrei Stackenschneider.
- No. 54 – the Tolstoy House, a former revenue house, designed and built in 1910—1912 by Fyodor Lidval.
- No. 62 – the Petrovsky Commercial College of the St. Petersburg Merchant Society architects F. S. Kharlamov, V. T. Tokarev, 1882, reconstructed in 1906 by P. A. Gilev.
- No. 65 – the Bolshoi Drama Theater, that in 1918 replaced the Suvorin Theatre. The building was designed and constructed in 1876 by Ludovick Fontana for general Anton Apraksin.
- No. 70-72 – the building of the Main Treasury — State Bank (architect D. M. Iofan, S. S. Serafimov), 1913-1915.
- No. 74-78 – Loan office and barracks of the Ministry of Finance, management of State savings banks (architect Aleksander von Gogen), 1898-1900.
- No. 87A – Lebedev's house, 1809. Data on this building was lost in 1910, but according to prominent Russian historian Igor Grabar it could be attributed to architect Yury Felten. The mansion was built for Vytegra merchant K. P. Galashevsky, but its modern name comes after last pre-revolutionary owner — lieutenant V. J. Lebedev.
- No. 90 (Gorokhovaya Street, 50A) – Kukanova-Klado house, 1831—1832, architect Avraam Melnikov. The mansion was built for merchant's wife A. Kukanova and was designed as a part of a single ensemble with house No. 81 and Semyonovsky Bridge.
- No. 97 — Olenin's mansion, here in 1820 young Alexander Pushkin first met Anna Kern.
- No. 110 — House of architect Karl Maevsky, 1881.
- No. 114 – the Saint Petersburg State Youth Theatre on the Fontanka.
- No. 115 – the Yusupov Palace, 1770, architect Giacomo Quarenghi.
- No. 118 – the Derzhavin Palace, 1791—1793, architect Grigory Pilnikov.
- No. 132 – the former Alexander Hospital for workers.
- No. 152 – the former Elizabeth Hospital for children, established in 1844 and named after Grand Duchess Elizabeth Mikhailovna.
- No. 156 – the Kalinkinsky naval hospital, architect M. Pasypkin, 1845-1853.
- No. 166 – the Kalinkin work house, 1720, rebuilt.

== Sources ==
- Ageev, A. N.; Ageev, S. A.; Ageev, N. A. (2019). Между Фонтанкой и Обводным каналом южнее Невского [Between Fontanka and Obvodny Channel to South of Nevsky]. Limbus-Press. ISBN 978-5-8370-0735-4.
- Annenkova, E. A. (2013). "Императорское Училище правоведения" [Imperial School of Jurisprudence]. Space and Time (in Russian). p. 217.
- Sartakova, Mary (2007). Реки и каналы Санкт-Петербурга [Rivers and Channels of St Petersburg]. Vokrug Sveta. ISBN 9785457012820.
- Komelova, G. N.; Mirolubova, G. A. (1978). Невский проспект в изобразительном искусстве: XVIII-первая половина XIX века: каталог выставки из фондов отдела истории русской культуры [Nevsky Prospekt in Visual Arts: Eighteenth to First Part of the Nineteenth Century: Exhibition Catalogue (History of Russian Art Department, State Hermitage Museum)]. Leningrad: Aurora. p. 56.
- Yusupov, E. S. (1994). Словарь терминов архитектуры [Architectural Dictionary]. Leningrad: 'Leningradskaya Galereya' Foundation. p. 161. ISBN 9785858250043.
- Klimenko, J. G.; Klimenko, S. V. (2010). "Государственные архитектурно-строительные Комиссии и их роль в градостроительном развитии Санкт-Петербурга и Москвы в XVIII веке" [State Architectural and Construction Committees and their Significance in Development of St Petersburg and Moscow in the Eighteenth Century]. Academia (in Russian). 4.
- Giangrande, Cathy (2003). Saint Petersburg: Museums, Palaces, and Historic Collections. Boston: Bunker Hill Publishing. pp. 64–65. ISBN 1593730004.
