= Alexander Shuvalov =

Russian statesman

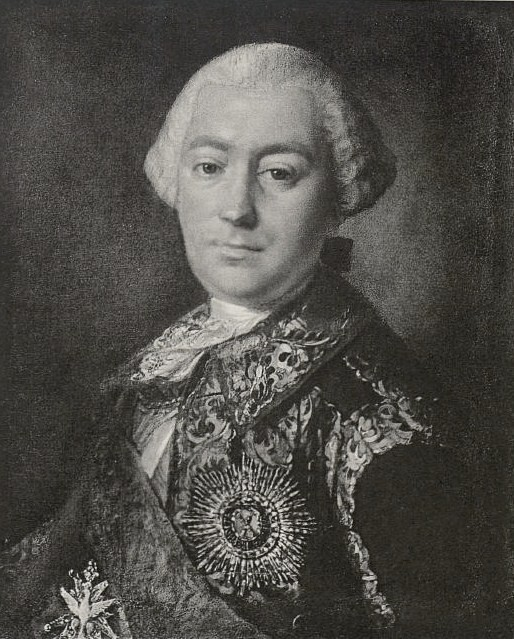
Alexander Shuvalov

Count Alexander Ivanovich Shuvalov (Russian: Алекса́ндр Ива́нович Шува́лов, romanized: Aleksandr Ivanovič Šuvalov; 1710 – 13 October 1771) was a Russian statesman from the Shuvalov family. His career was dependent on and overshadowed by that of his more brilliant brother, Pyotr Ivanovich Shuvalov.

The Shuvalov brothers were two sons of a general who commanded the castle of Vyborg and governed Arkhangelsk during the reign of Empress Anna. They were the closest aides to Elizabeth Petrovna during the 1741 coup d'etat that brought her to the throne. Alexander, in particular, persuaded many of his fellow imperial guards to join Elizabeth's cause. He was rewarded for his allegiance with the rank of Chamberlain in 1741 and the title of count in 1746.

For many years Shuvalov presided over the Secret Chancellory, a sort of political police whose victims included his personal enemies, Field Marshals Aleksey Bestuzhev and Stepan Fyodorovich Apraksin. By the end of Elizabeth's reign, the Shuvalovs successfully eliminated all their political rivals and virtually monopolized state power. They also flirted with the future Peter III of Russia, hoping to retain their positions after his eventual accession to the throne.

Their intrigues succeeded in 1761 when Peter III assumed the throne and promoted both Shuvalovs to Field Marshals, although they had never taken part in any war. But their careers were undone within a year, as the throne was usurped by Peter's wife Catherine, who detested the Shuvalovs for their pernicious influence on her husband and even accused in her memoirs Alexander Shuvalov of plotting to murder her.

Thereupon Shuvalov retired from service and withdrew to his villages. His only daughter was the wife of Count Golovkin.
