= Italyanskaya Street =

Thoroughfare in Saint Petersburg, Russia

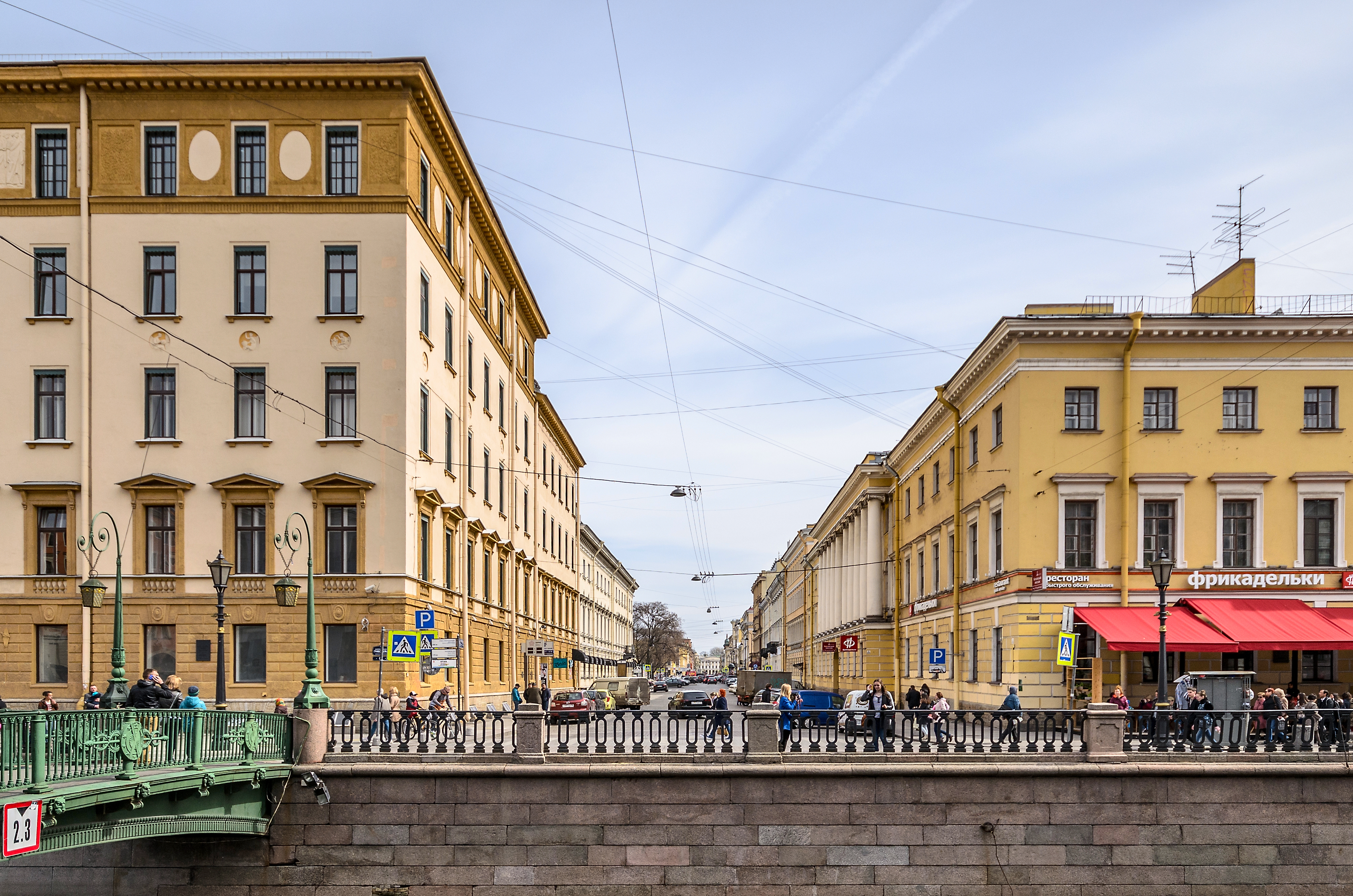
- Interactive map of Italyanskaya Street
- Native name: Итальянская улица (Russian)
- Location: Tsentralny District, Saint Petersburg, Russia

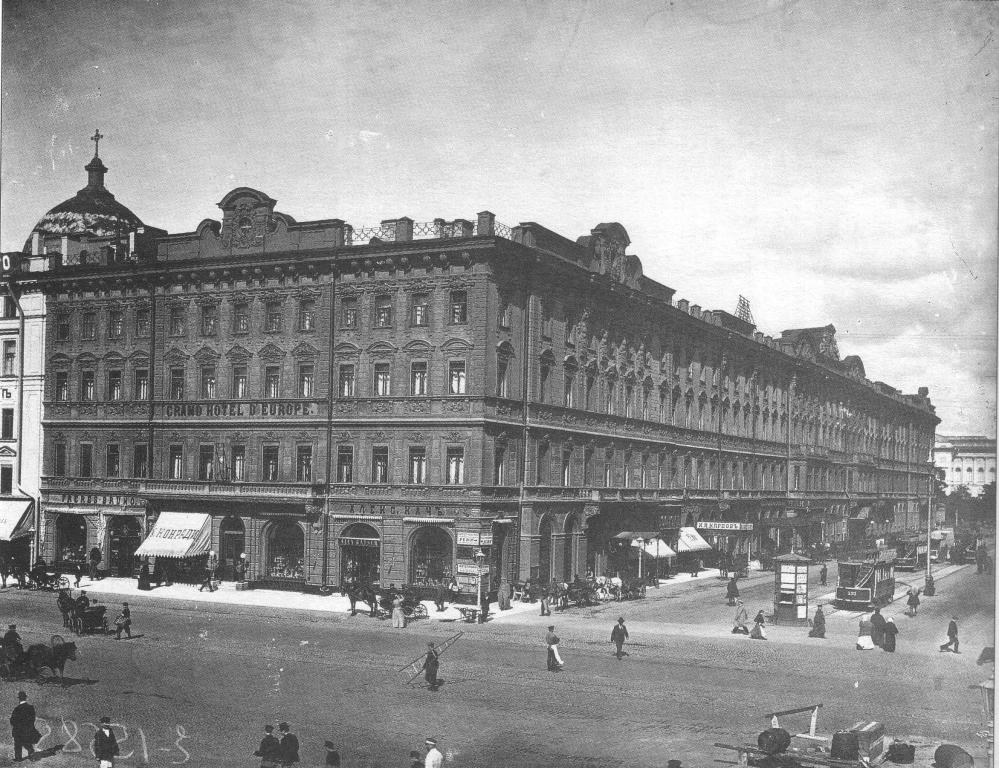
Horse tram station near Grand Hotel Europe, early 20th century

Italyanskaya Street (Russian: Итальянская улица, romanized: Ital'yaskaya ulitsa, lit. 'Italian Street') is a street located in the Tsentralny District of Saint Petersburg, Russia. It runs parallel to Nevsky Prospect between the Griboyedov Canal to the Fontanka, intersecting with the Arts Square and Manezhnaya Square, as well as the Mikhailovskaya, Sadovaya, Malaya Sadovaya and Karavannaya streets.

The Italyanskaya Street was named after the Italian Palace, built in 1739 for either Empress Catherine I or Grand Duchess Anna Petrovna (the wife and daughter of Peter the Great, respectively) on the opposite side of the Fontanka, and demolished in the early 19th century. The Catherine Institute was built in its place, and the current building belongs to the National Library of Russia.

Between 1871 and 1902, the street was called Bolshaya Italyanskaya ("Big Italian"), while the modern Zhukovskogo Street was called Malaya Italyanskaya ("Small Italian").

== Notable buildings ==
Many buildings on this street are listed as cultural heritage objects:

- No. 1 — House of Jesuits
- No. 2/6 — Branobel house
- No. 3 — Catholic Church of Saint Catherine
- No. 7/1 — Grand Hotel Europe
- No. 9/2 — Saint Petersburg Philharmonia
- No. 23/12 — House with Four Colonnades
- No. 25 — Shuvalov Mansion
- No. 27 — Radio House
- No. 39/21 — Naryshkin-Shuvalov Palace

== Literature ==
- Sindalovsky, Naum (2014). Городские имена вчера и сегодня [City Names of Today and Yesterday] (in Russian). Centerpoligraph. ISBN 978-5-227-04803-5.
- Petrov, Petr Nikolaevich (1884). История Санкт-Петербурга [History of St Petersburg]. Glazunov PH.
