= Malaya Sadovaya Street =

Street in St. Petersburg, Russia

Coordinates: 59°56′6″N 30°20′15.9″E

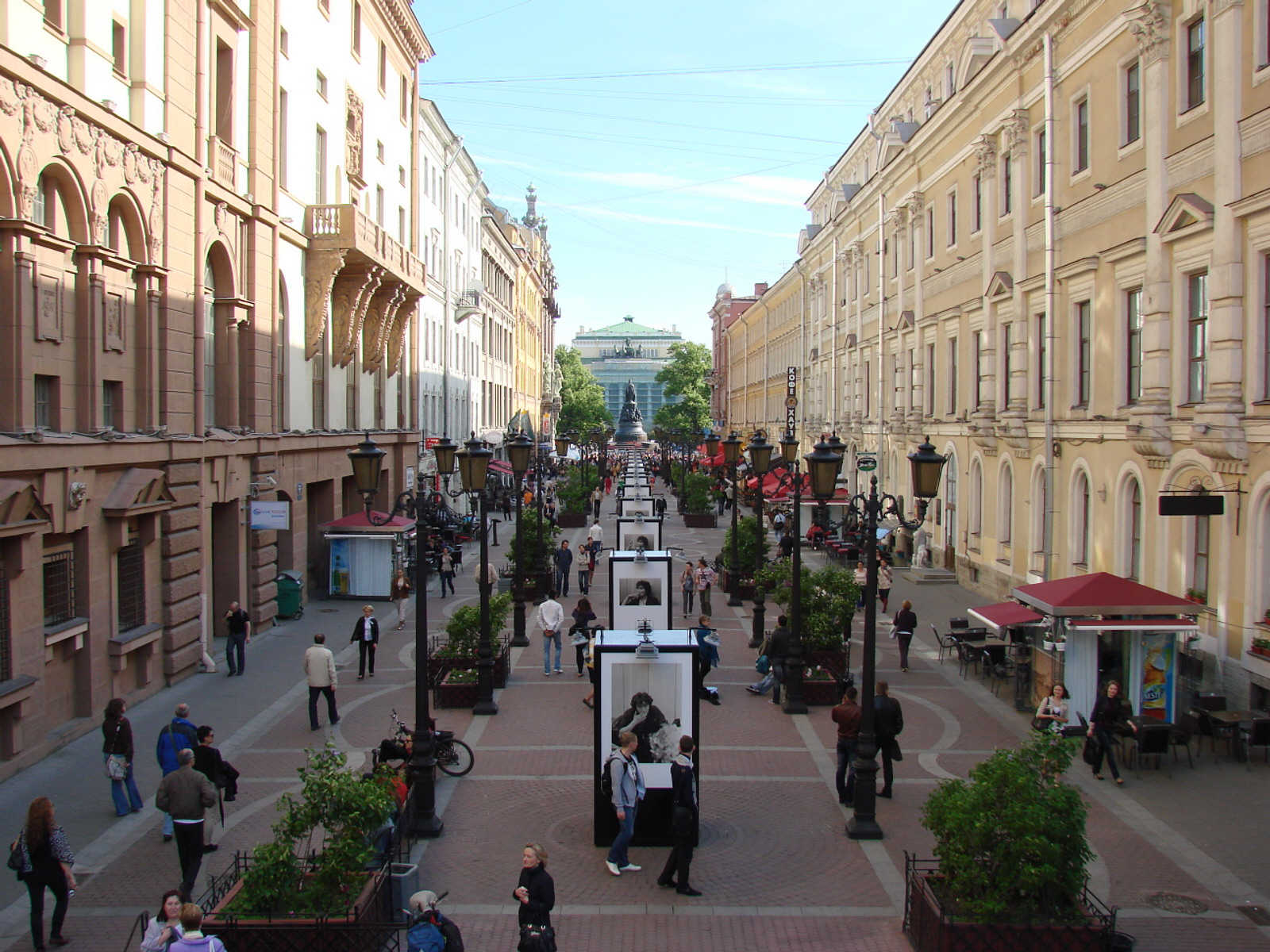
Malaya Sadovaya Street

Malaya Sadovaya Street (Russian: Малая Садовая Улица, meaning 'Little Garden Street') is a pedestrian street of cafes, terraces and fountains in the heart of Saint Petersburg, Russia. It runs between Italyanskaya Street (Italian Street) and the Nevsky Prospect. Spanning a single block, at about 175 metres (574 ft), it is known as Saint Petersburg's shortest street.

The street's Nevsky Prospect terminus is at Catherine Square, which features the monument to Catherine the Great by the sculptors Mikhail Mikeshin and Matthew Chizhov, and the architects Victor Schröter and David Grimm. At the Italyanskaya Street terminus is Manezhnaya Square, where there is a view of the portico of the great stables designed by Vincenzo Brenna and Karl Rossi.

== History ==
The street, then called New Lane (Russian: Новым переулком), was first made in the 1740s. A palace belonging to Ivan Shuvalov was built here, completed in 1756, after which the street was called Shuvalov Lane. All the odd side of the street was owned by Shuvalov. His palace was at the corner of Italian Street, after which there was a small fenced garden. From this the street began to be called Little Garden Street from about 1850.

The street was a favored walking venue for Alexander II. In 1873, the street was renamed to Catherine Street in honor of Catherine the Great. It kept this name until the 1917 Revolution.

In September 1918, a number of streets and squares in Petersburg were renamed, and Catherine Street was renamed Proletkulta Street, after the cultural, educational, and literary organization Proletkult which at the time was housed on the street, at Number 2. But after World War II, most of these streets were returned to their historical names, and in 1949, Proletkulta Street again became Malaya Sadovaya Street.

== Notable buildings ==
=== Shuvalov Mansion ===
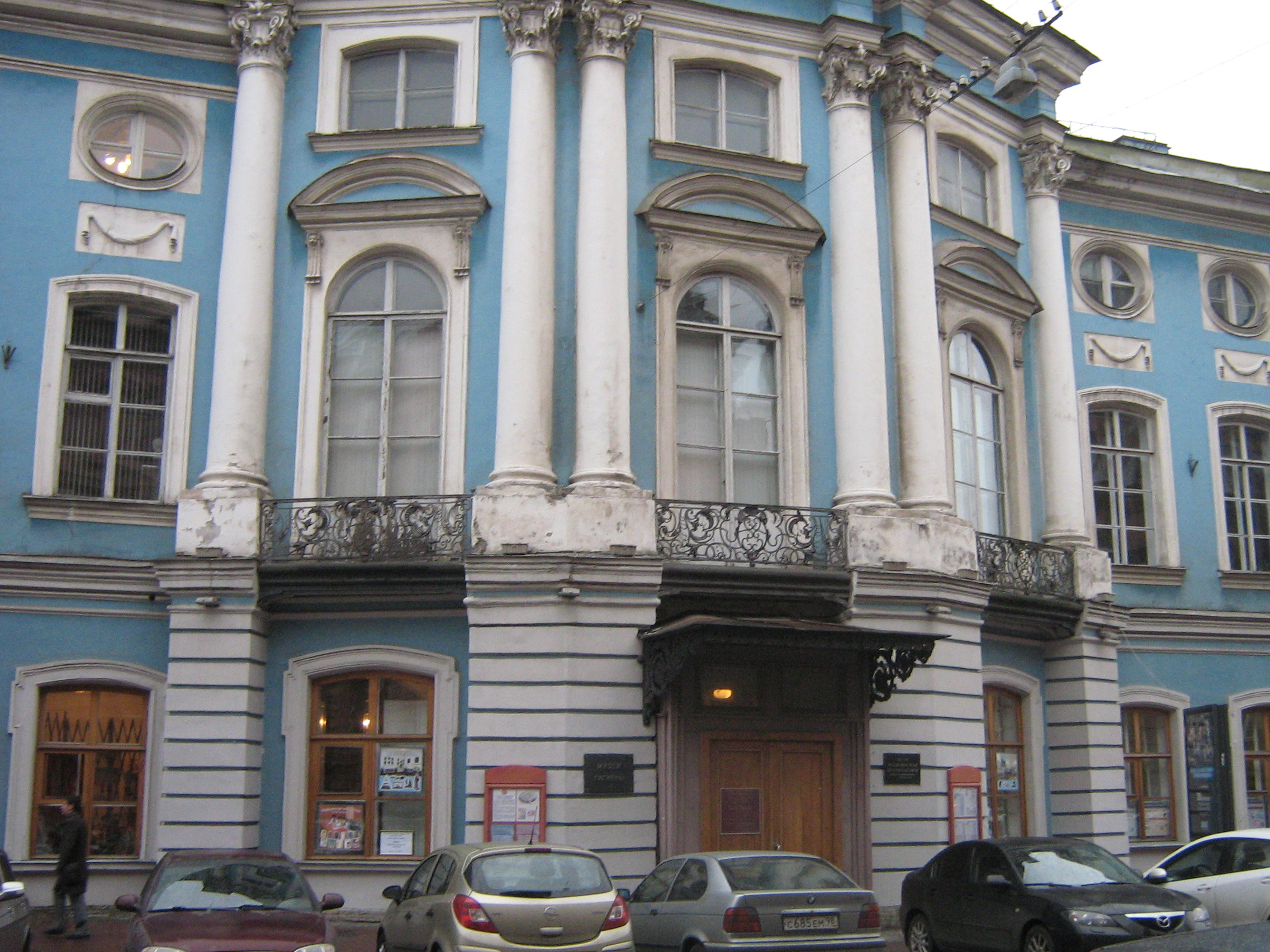
Shuvalov Mansion

The Shuvalov Mansion at 1 Malaya Sadovaya/25 Italyanskaya was designed by the architect Savva Chevakinsky for Ivan Shuvalov and constructed in 1749–1756. From 1802 to 1917, it housed the Ministry of Justice of the Russian Empire. An addition to the middle part of the ministry building was constructed in 1845–1849; the initial design was by Fyodor Braun and the project was completed by Dmitry Efimov.

From 1875 to 1927, the jurist Anatoly Koni lived in the building. Later, it housed the Public Health Committee of St. Petersburg and the Museum of Hygiene, which is still there today.

=== Radio House ===
Across the street, at 2 Malaya Sadovaya/27 Italyanskaya, the architect brothers Vasily Kosyakov, Vladimir Kosyakov, and Georgi Kosyakov designed a building for the Saint Petersburg Assembly of Nobles, which was constructed in 1912–1914.

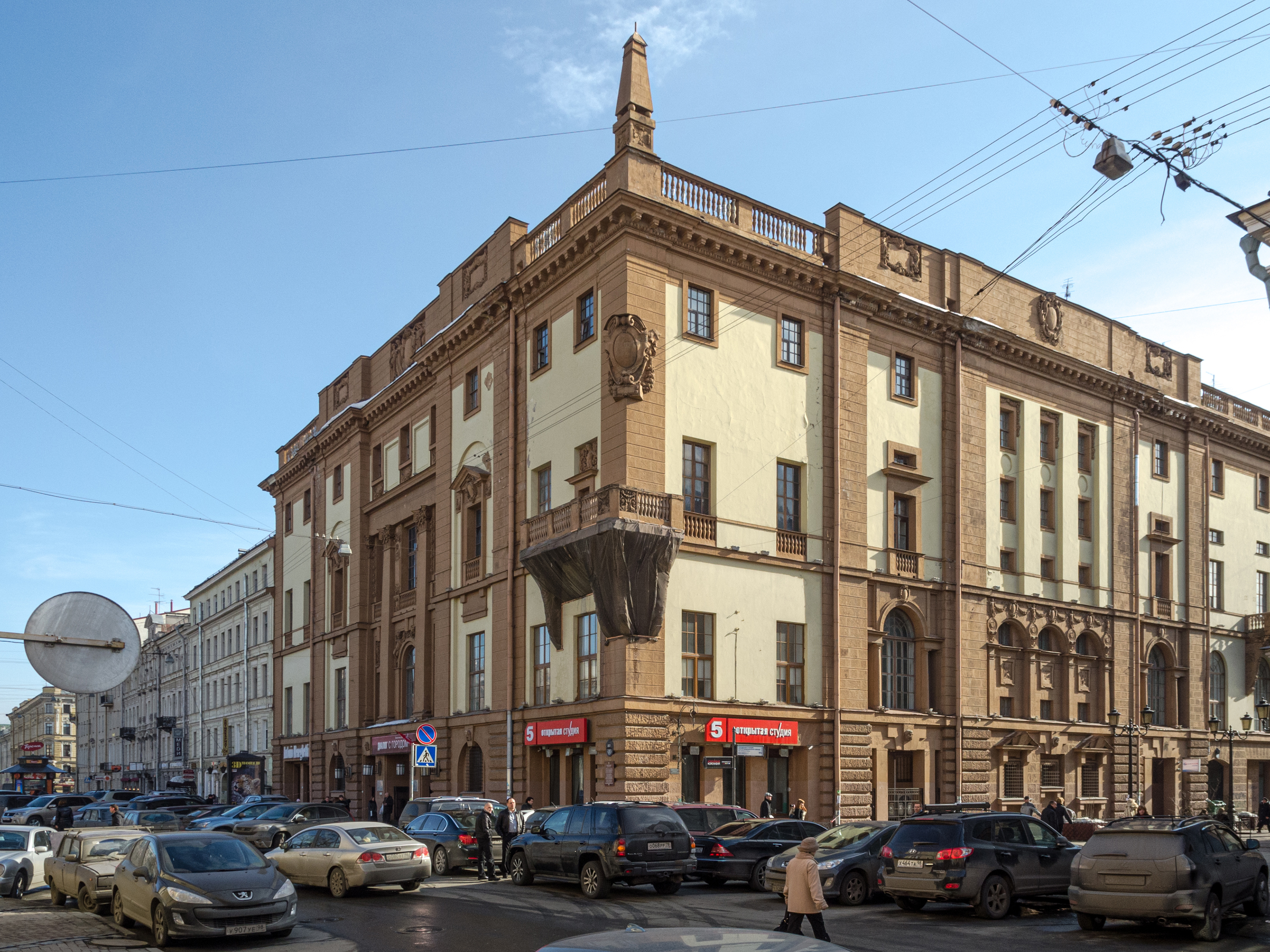
Radio House

With the coming of World War I, the Japanese Red Cross set up a hospital in the building for severely wounded soldiers. Japanese doctors, nurses, and pharmacists worked here together with their Russian counterparts, and the staff took pride in the low mortality rate achieved – 6 deaths among the 500 patients admitted. Among the nurses was the wife of the Japanese Ambassador Motono Ichirō. Soon, the sprawling hospital took over the whole building, except for the theater hall and several rooms reserved for the Noble Assembly. The Japanese left in April 1916.

In 1918, the Proletkult organization took over the building. During this time, the actor, director, and founder of the Petroproletkulta Theater, Aleksandr Mgebrov, worked here. In 1930, Proletarian Culture was disbanded, and beginning in 1933, the building housed Radio Leningrad. This was active during the Siege of Leningrad, and Radio Committee employees lived, worked, and died here. From here, they supported the Leningraders with their transmissions, and Olga Bergholz, the muse of the embattled city, read her poems and speeches.

On September 7, 1993, the Legislative Assembly of Saint Petersburg declared Radio House a monument of historical, cultural, and architectural significance. A plaque to the courage of the workers of Radio Leningrad during the siege now adorns the building entrance.

The studios of Channel 5 are housed there now. The street outside is sometimes used by the station as the site of "man in the street" interviews of passersby.

=== Demidov House ===
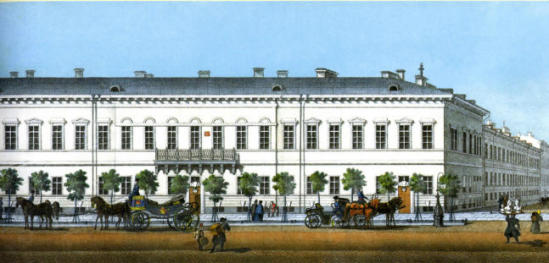
Demidov House

The Demidov House was built in the 18th century at the corner of Malaya Sadovaya Street and Nevsky Prospect (3 Malaya Sadovaya/54 Nevsky Prospect). In the 19th century, the house underwent two major renovations. The first was in 1841 to a design by Aleksandr Pel. Later, the architect Pavel Suzor designed a major reconstruction with new facades, which was undertaken in 1882–1883.

Later, the building went into the possession of A. Ushokov and became an apartment house. The singer Pauline Viardot-Garcia lived here in 1843, and the photographer Karl Bulla had his studio here. Today, the building houses a small museum dedicated to Bulla.

In 2000, the Expert Committee recommended that this building be placed on the list of newly identified sites of historical, scientific, artistic or other cultural value and included in the list of monuments of history and culture.

=== Armyaninova House ===
At 4 Malaya Sadovaya Street is the Armyaninova House. Here in 1828 lived the poet Ivan Kozlov, a contemporary of Pushkin.

=== Elisseevskiy Store ===
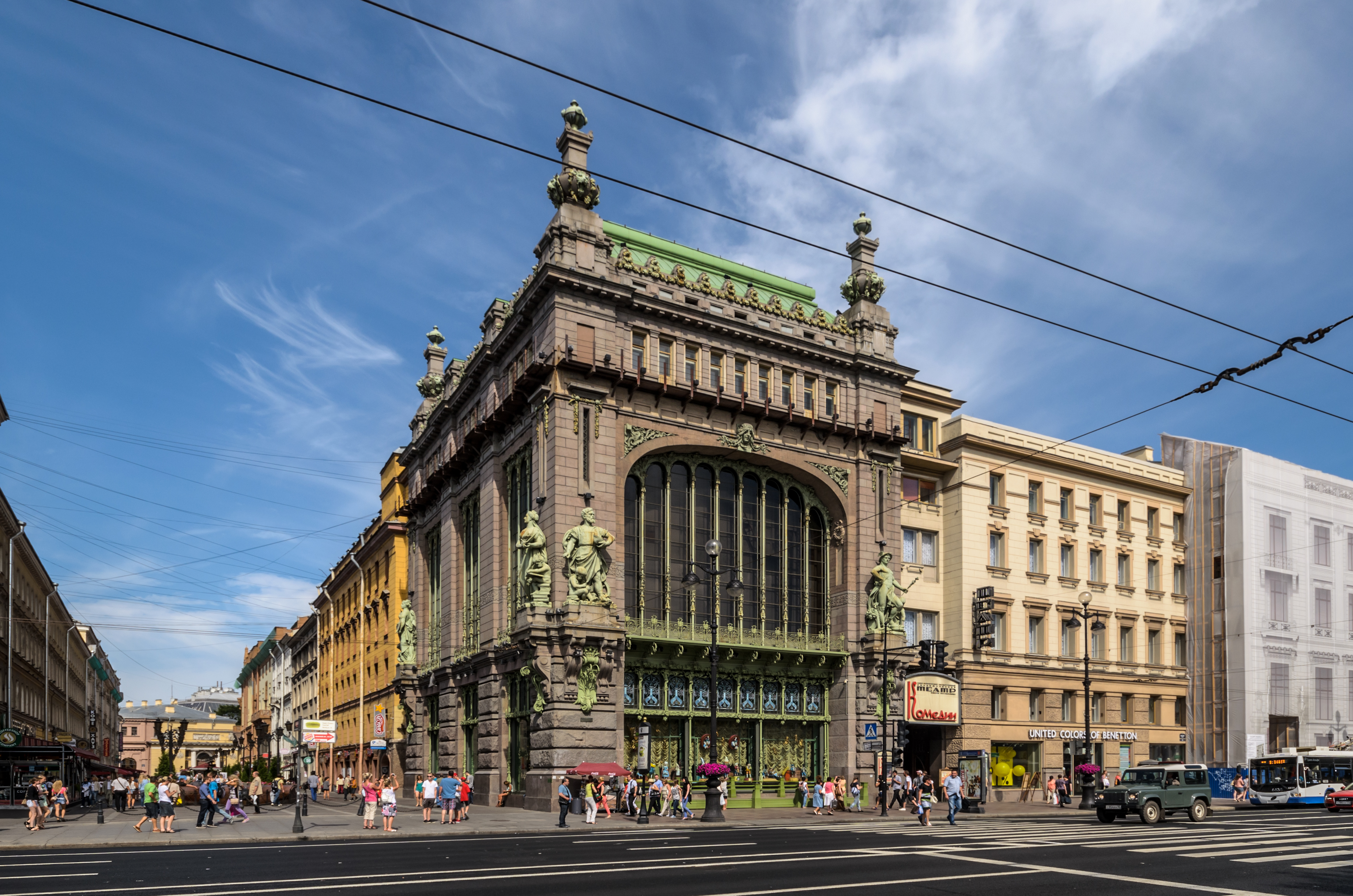
Elisseevskiy Store

At the corner of Malaya Sadovaya Street and Nevsky Prospect (8 Malaya Sadovaya/56 Nevsky Prospect) is the Elisseeff Emporium, designed in the Art Nouveau style by Gavriil Baranovsky and constructed 1902–1903.

A restaurant formerly stood at the site. In 1881, revolutionary Narodniks built a tunnel under Malaya Sadovaya Street from the basement of that building, preparing to plant mines to assassinate Czar Alexander II. By March 1 the preparations were complete, but the Czar did not pass that way on that day (and was instead killed by other means).

The Saint Petersburg Comedy Theatre is housed in this building.

== Conversion to pedestrian street ==
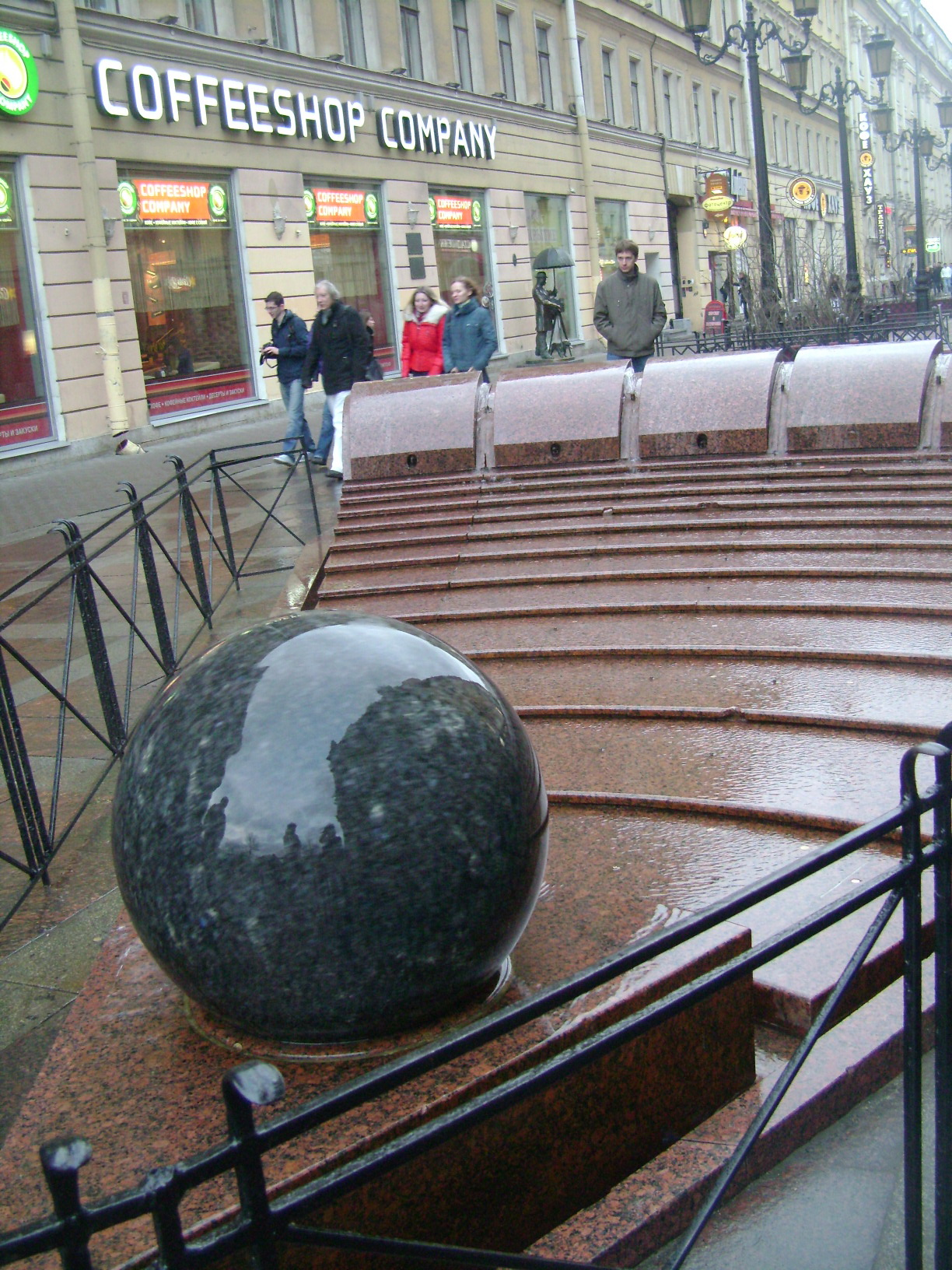
The Kugel ball

In 1999 Malaya Sadovaya Street was turned into a pedestrian zone. The street was paved with tiles, the separation between street and sidewalk was removed, benches were added, pipes were laid under the streets carrying heated water to keep the street free of snow and ice, and a fountain featuring a Kugel ball (a heavy stone ball easily rotatable because of lubrication by the fountain's water) was built.

Later, small sculptures were added:

- In 1991, "Dog Gavryusha" by V. A. Sivakov was placed in the courtyard of a house.
- In 2000, two metal cats (named Elisha and Vasilisa) were placed on eaves above the street, at #3 and #8. Petersburgers throw coins at the cats hoping that their wish will be granted if one lands near.
- In 2003, the Monument to the Saint Petersburg photographer, a sculpture by B. Petrov was placed, of pioneering photographer Karl Bulla (a former street resident) with a camera and droll bulldog.

== In art and literature ==
Malaya Sadovaya Street is the subject of Malaya Sadovaya Street, a 1979 painting depicting the street in rain by Alexander Semionov, a leader of the Leningrad School of Painting.
