= Izmaylova's House =

Izmaylova's House, Pushkin
- Дом Измайловой
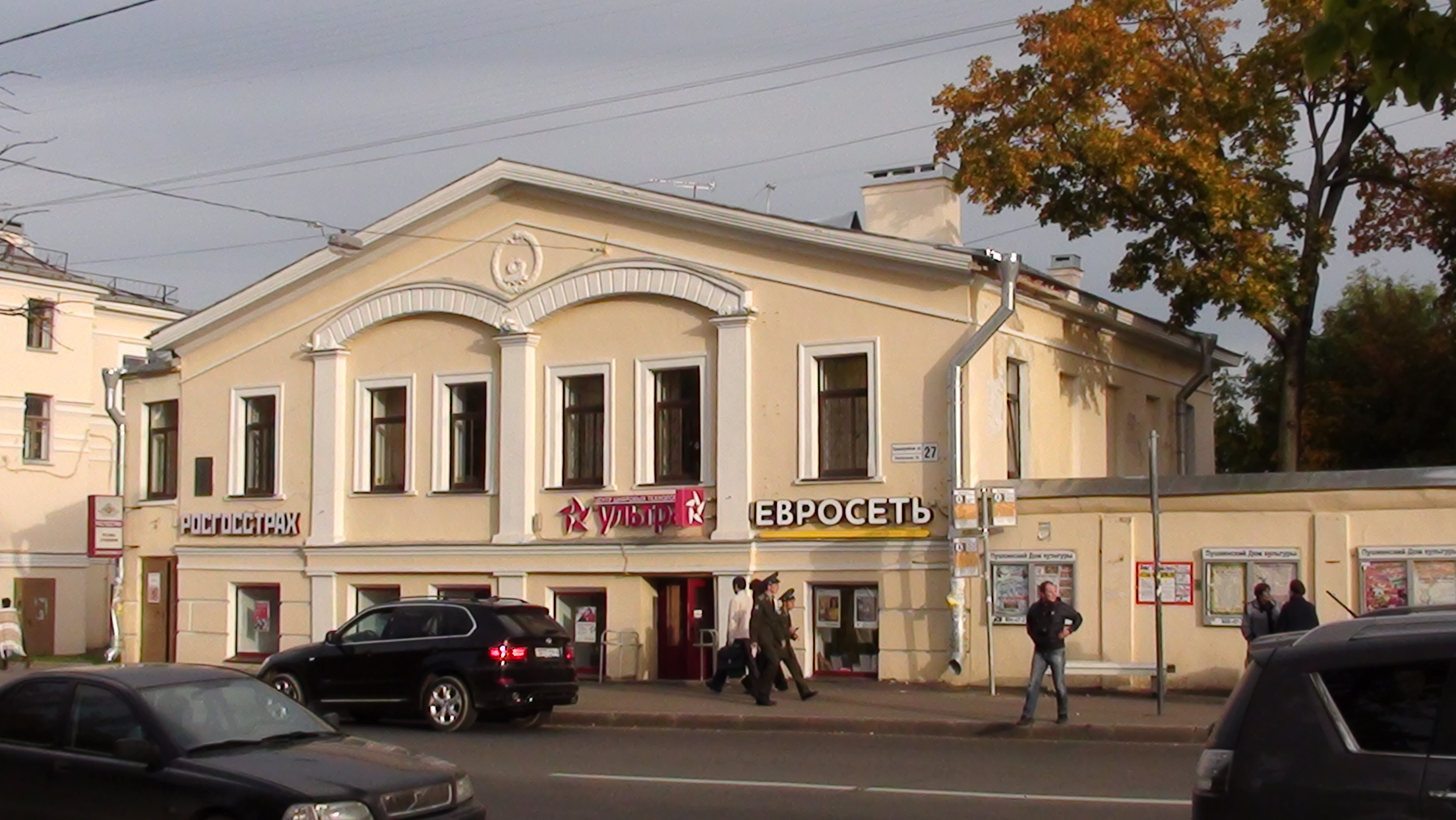
- Interactive map of the Izmaylova's House, Pushkin area

General information
- Architectural style: Classicism
- Location: Pushkin, 27 Oranzherejnaya Street
- Coordinates: 59°43′12″N 30°24′34″E
- Construction started: 1836
- Completed: 1839

Design and construction
- Architect: S. Cherfolio

Izmaylova's House (also Izmaylovs' House or Timofeevs' House) is a historically significant building in Pushkin, Saint Petersburg, built between 1836 and 1839. The building is located on 27 Oranzherejnaya Street, facing Cathedral Square (aka Sobornaya Square).

== History ==
According to the original city plan, the eastern side of Cathedral Square was designated for government institutions. However, this area remained vacant for a significant period of time. In 1835, some of the plots were reassigned for the construction of private residential buildings. Architect Sebastian Cherfolio was responsible for designing a complex of five houses in this area, one of which (Plot No. 288a) was designated for Izmailova, a titular counsellor.

Subsequently, collegiate assessor P. P. Izmailov became the owner of the house. Years later, the Timofeevs lived in the building. In 1914, the building was home to Leonov's store of colonial produce. In the 21st century, the second floor of the building became occupied by the city's prosecutor's office.

== Architecture ==
The house features elements of late Neoclassical architecture. It is similar to Emelianov's house in terms of symmetry. Both houses feature a double arch as the central element, which harmonizes with the arches of St Catherine's Cathedral. These arches were later replicated on the facade of Gostiny Dvor. The facades of the house are adorned with wide gables and a partially preserved relief depicting a wreath and a lyre. Unfortunately, the original metal brackets for lamps have not been preserved.

== Literature ==
- Семенова Г. В. (2009). Царское Село: знакомое и незнакомое. М.: Центрполиграф. pp. 363–364. ISBN 978-5-9524-4249-8.

== Sources ==
- "Оранжерейная 19, 21, 23, 27, 29. Дома архитектора Черфолио". Энциклопедия Царского Села. Archived from the original on 2018-07-11.
- "Дом Измайловых - Дом Тимофеевых". citywalls.ru.
