= Kanobbio House =

- Дом Каноббио
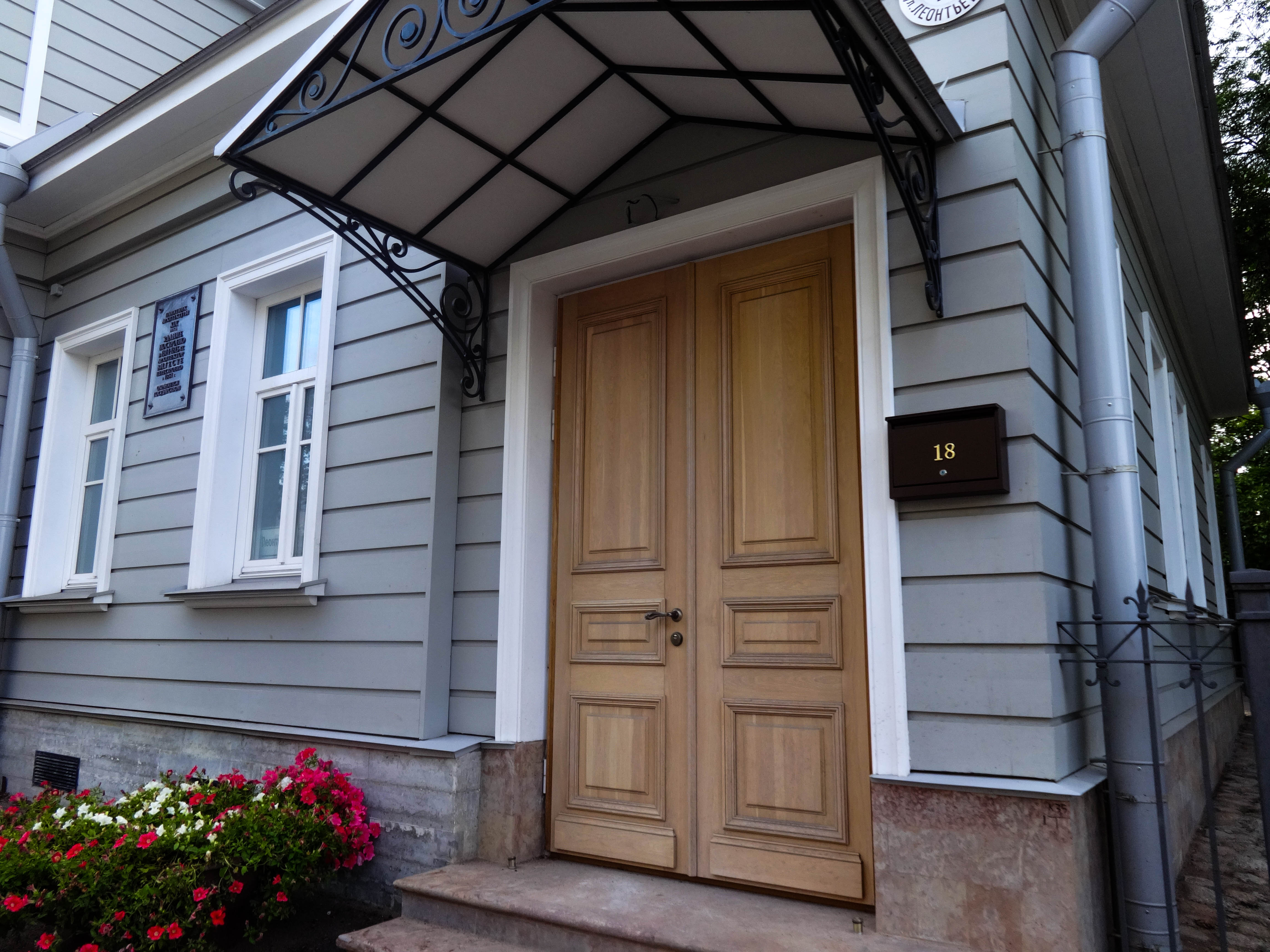
- Interactive map of the Kanobbio House area

General information
- Location: Pushkin, 18 Leontyevskaya Street
- Coordinates: 59°43′11″N 30°24′12″E
- Completed: 1815

Design and construction
- Architect: William Heste

Kanobbio House is a historical mansion in Pushkin, Saint Petersburg. It was constructed in 1815. The house is an object of the cultural heritage of the federal significance. It is located on 18 Leontyevskaya Street.

== History ==
The first owner of the house was the inspector of the Tahitian water conduit of the Tsarskoe Selo Palace administration engineer-lieutenant Francis Canobbio. The wooden house for him was designed by the architect V. I. Geste in 1814, and the house was finished in 1815. The owner did not manage to complete all the documents for the possession of the house until his death in 1819, and the heirs of Canobbio settled there. In the years 1832–1851. The house was owned by the Austrian architect Sebastian Cherforio. In 1851 the house passed to the wife of the actual State Councilor EI Kuzminskaya (Voevodskaya). By her order, the house was rebuilt according to the project of IA Monighetti, side mezzanines were built, as well as an entrance to the house from Leontief Street. At the same time, under the project of NS Nikitin, the house was enlarged towards the yard. In the years 1859–1874. The house was owned by the actual state councilor IG Kuzminsky, in 1874–1915. - Doctor of Medicine IM Ost and AI Ost (son of the previous). From 1905 to 1917 in the house lived LZ Lansere, chairman of the board of the Russian Insurance Society. After the October Revolution the house became multi-apartment, three apartments were allocated. In the 2010s it was adapted to accommodate a museum and a café.

== Architecture ==
The wooden house is built in the style of classicism. It has one floor with a cross-shaped mezzanine. The main façade retains its original appearance. At its center is a fortified rampart, above which there is a mezzanine with a semicircular Venetian window. In the piers of the first floor there are two ionic half-columns with volutes. Mezzanine framed by two-sided pilasters of the Tuscan order.

== Literature ==
- Семенова Г. В. (2009). Царское Село: знакомое и незнакомое. М.: Центрполиграф. pp. 386–389. ISBN 978-5-9524-4249-8.

== Sources ==
- "Леонтьевская 18. Дом Каноббио". Энциклопедия Царского Села.
- "Дом Ф. Каноббио - Дом Е. И. Кузьминской". citywalls.ru.
