= Zvegincev's House =

- Дом Звегинцева
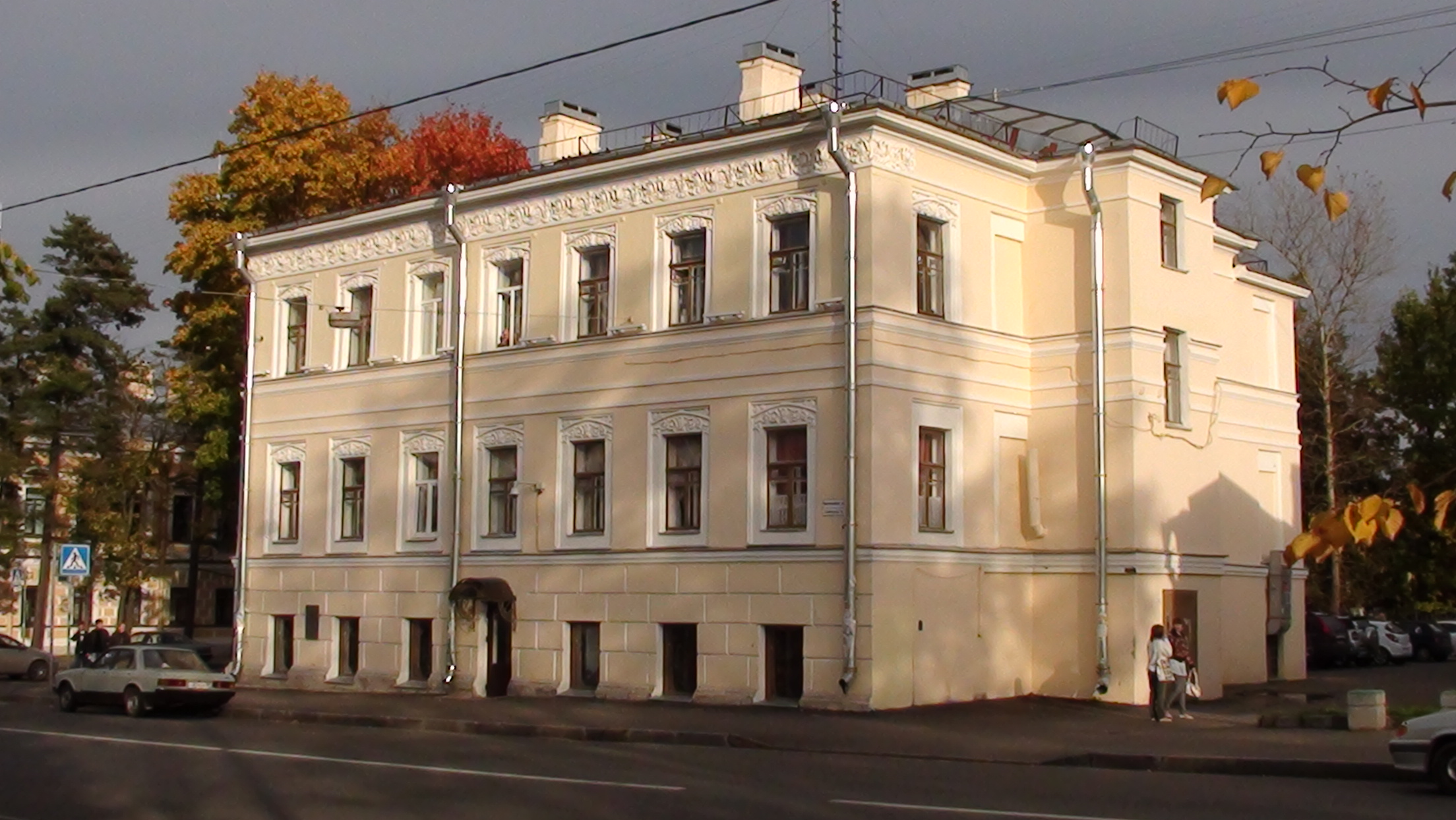
- Interactive map of the Zvegincev's House area

General information
- Architectural style: Classicism
- Location: Pushkin, 29/23 Oranzherejnaya Street
- Coordinates: 59°43′13″N 30°24′35″E
- Construction started: 1836
- Completed: 1839

Design and construction
- Architect: S. Cherfolio

Zvegincev's House is a building of the historical significance in Pushkin, Saint Petersburg. It was built in the period of 1836–1839. Nowadays it is an object of cultural heritage. The building is located on 29/23 Oranzherejnaya Street.

== History ==
A large plot on the eastern side of the Cathedral Square was assigned to the site of the general plan of the city and was empty for a long time. In 1835 the plots were allocated for development by private residential buildings. The projects of all five houses were made by the architect Sebastian Cherfolio, they formed a single ensemble. The house on the corner with Pushkinskaya Street was intended for the court non-commissioned master of the 5th class. Later he moved to the valet of the emperor V. P. Potapov. At him the house was expanded from the yard. According to Potapov's will, the house passed to the clergy of the Catherine's Cathedral, it housed a parochial school (according to other sources, the school was located in the house as early as 1867). In 1963 the house was completely renovated. The house remains residential, on the ground floor for a long time are located catering enterprises.

== Architecture ==
The house is decorated uniformly with the house of Rodaks located on the other side of the Cathedral Square. The house is square in plan, three-storey (counting the high ground floor, finished with a rust). Magnificent stucco decoration decorates evenly located window apertures, in particular, thin sandricks, and also decorates the frieze. The flower ornament prevails, on the frieze the images of pairs of swans are repeated. The design is celebrated by Byzantine motifs used in ancient Russian architecture.

== Literature ==
- Семенова Г. В. (2009). Царское Село: знакомое и незнакомое. М.: Центрполиграф. pp. 363–364. ISBN 978-5-9524-4249-8.

== Sources ==
- "Оранжерейная 19, 21, 23, 27, 29. Дома архитектора Черфолио". Энциклопедия Царского Села. Archived from the original on 2018-07-11.
- "Оранжерейная 29. Дом Звегинцева (Тимофеевых)". Энциклопедия Царского Села. Archived from the original on 2018-07-11.
- "Дом Звегинцева - Дом В. П. Потапова - Дом причта Екатерининского собора". citywalls.ru.
