= Kalashnikova's House =

- Дом Калашниковой
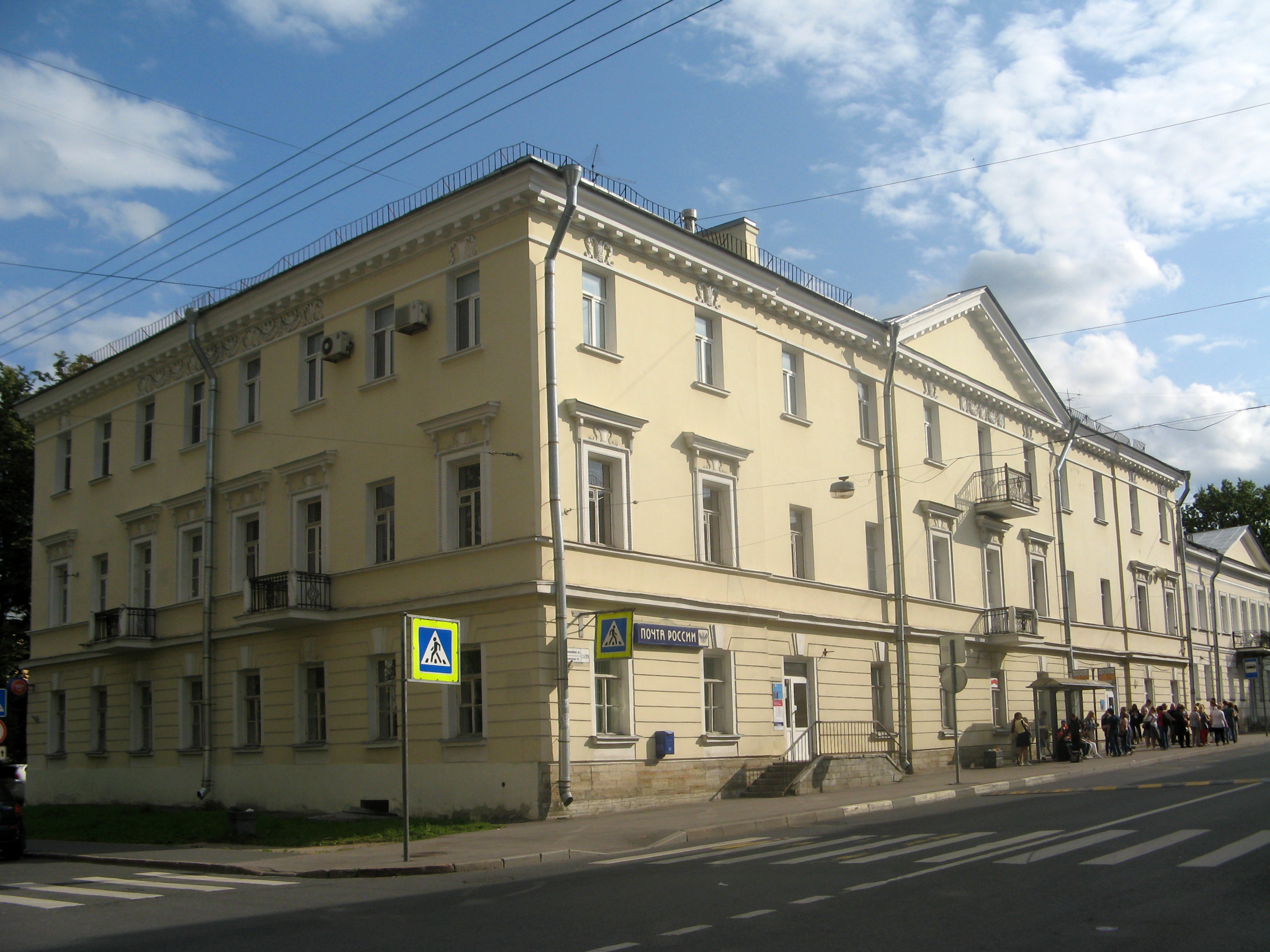
- Interactive map of the Kalashnikova's House area

General information
- Architectural style: Neoclassicism
- Location: Pushkin, 29/11 Malaya Street
- Coordinates: 59°43′02″N 30°24′22″E
- Completed: 1881

Design and construction
- Architect: A. P. Goman

Kalashnikova's House is an historic building in Pushkin, Saint Petersburg, Russia. Built in 1881, it is an object of cultural heritage. The building is located on 29/11 Malaya Street.

== History ==
In the 1820s, two wooden buildings were construction on the future site of Kalashnikova's House.

The plot was later bought by the widow of merchant Ekaterina Fedorovna Kalashnikova, who decided to build a new house to accommodate a hotel. The construction was conducted by the architect AP Goman. The hotel was called "North".

In 1884, in the courtyard close to the neighboring house, architect P. P. Deineka built a two-story L-shaped stone wing. Both buildings were later occupied by the Pushkin Post Office, which was located there until modern times .

== Architecture ==
Since the main house is built on a small slope, then from the side of the street is a semi-basement. The house is decorated in the style of classicism, has a triangular pediment, under it a cornice with modulons and a frieze with stucco patterns in the form of wreaths. The first floor has a tape rust.

Window openings adorn castle stones and sandricks. The design of the upper part of the building was seriously changed during the restoration of the building after World War II.

== Literature ==
- Семенова Г. В. (2009). Царское Село: знакомое и незнакомое. М.: Центрполиграф. pp. 315–316. ISBN 978-5-9524-4249-8.

== Sources ==
- "Оранжерейная 9, 11. Дома Калашниковой (Северная гостиница)". Энциклопедия Царского Села. Archived from the original on 2018-07-07.
- "Дом Е. Ф. Калашниковой ("Северная гостиница")". citywalls.ru.
