= Savitskaya's House =

- Дом Савицкой
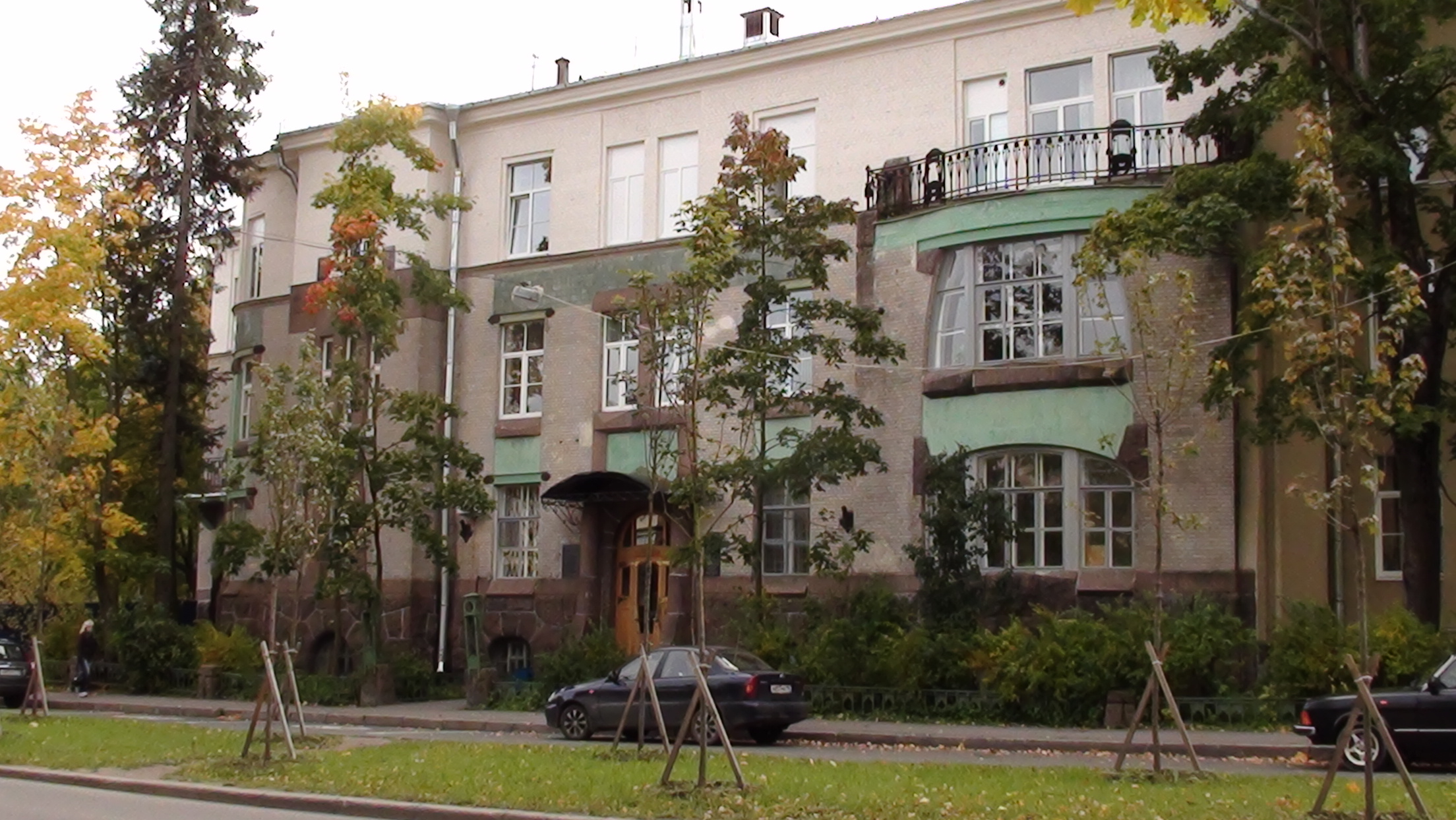
- Interactive map of the Savitskaya's House area

General information
- Location: Pushkin, 15 Moskovskaya Street
- Coordinates: 59°43′15″N 30°24′08″E
- Construction started: 1904
- Completed: 1905

Design and construction
- Architects: N.V. Vasiliev, A.V. Vasiliev

Savitskaya's House is a building of historical significance in Pushkin, Saint Petersburg. It was built in the period of 1904–1905. Nowadays it is an object of cultural heritage. The building is located at 15 Moskovskaya Street.

== History ==
Before the construction of the current building on the site was a wooden two-story house Sinitsinoy in the style of classicism. Maria Alekseevna Savitskaya, who purchased the plot in 1903, ordered to demolish the old house and hold a competition for the erection of a new one, in the Art Nouveau style. The project was won by the civil engineers of the brothers AV and NV Vasiliev. The project implemented in reality differs from the competitive one in a number of details. Since 1945, the building housed a polyclinic (current number 66). In 1956, the building was seriously rebuilt: the towers that had existed earlier were removed from the side risalitami, the third floor was built on the right, an additional building was added to the right.

== Architecture ==
The historical part includes the first two floors of the building. The main entrance to the building is faced with granite and resembles a portal. Granite columns make up the fence of the front garden, the "ragged" granite is trimmed and the base of the building. In the decoration of the facade, plaster, white brick lining and red granite are used. You can see the initial small window panes. One of the gratings protecting the balconies was preserved during the reconstruction. There is also a historical interior decoration. It is abundantly used the motif of pine branches: stucco friezes in the form of garlands of branches, bunches of branches with cones on consoles supporting the ladder, cones and bundles of needles in the decoration of the staircase. The stairs of the main staircase are marble. Staircases, the walls of the lobby are tiled with green tiles.

== Sources ==
- "Московская 17. Дом Савицкой". Энциклопедия Царского Села. Archived from the original on 2018-07-08.
- "Дом М. А. Савицкой - Поликлиника N 66". citywalls.ru.
