= Alekseevsky Orphanage =

- Алексеевский приют
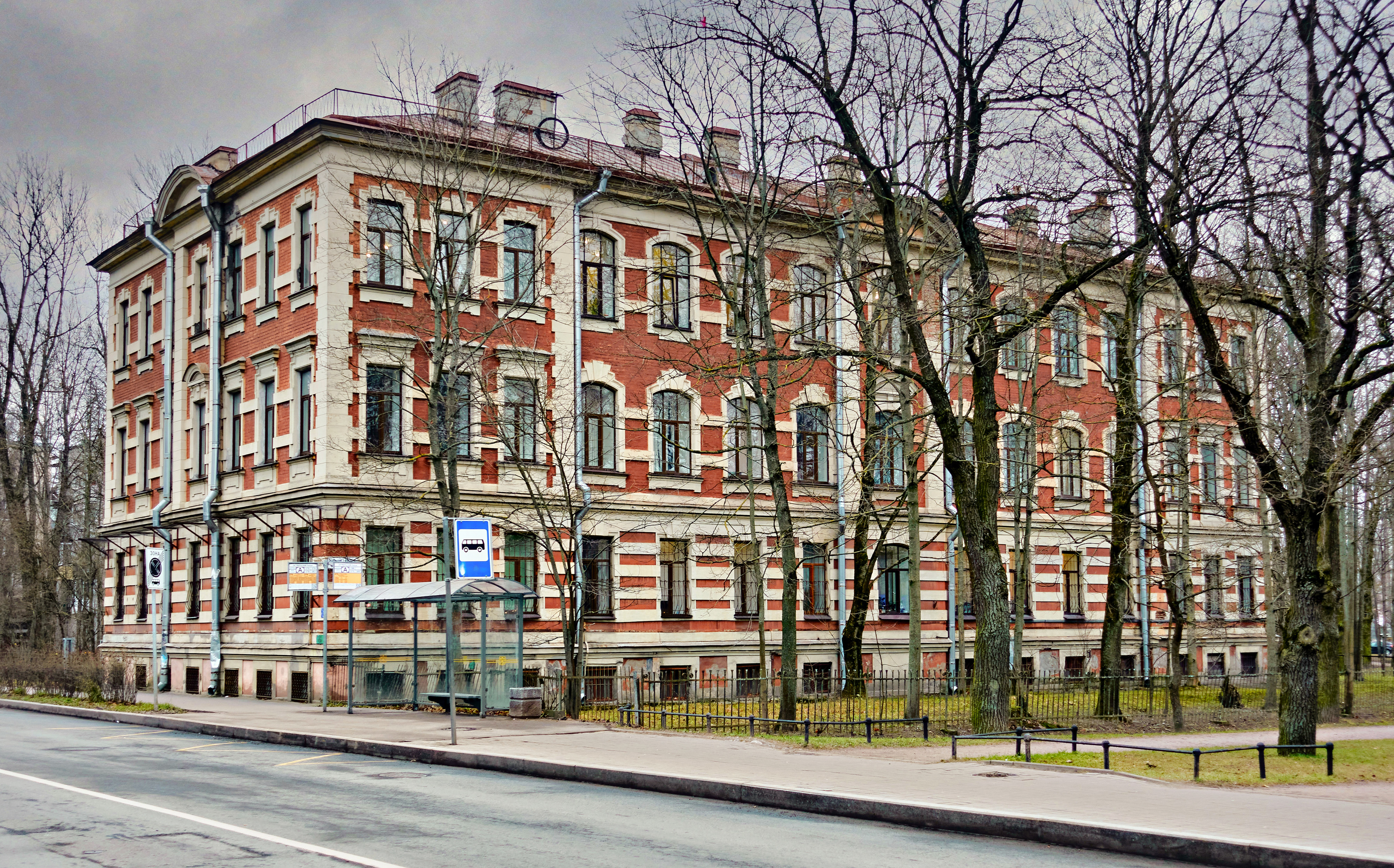

General information
- Location: Pushkin, 20/49 Oktyabrsky Boulevard
- Coordinates: 59°43′24″N 30°24′50″E
- Completed: 1905

Design and construction
- Architect: A. V. Druker

Alekseevsky orphanage of the Mariinsky department is a building of the historical significance in Pushkin, Saint Petersburg. It was built in 1905. Nowadays it is an object of cultural heritage. The building is located on 20/49 Oktyabrsky Boulevard.

== History ==
The shelter building was erected for money, bequeathed by the secret adviser NS Adamovich. The land was allocated for free by the Tsarskoye Selo Palace. The construction was conducted by the technician A. V. Drucker, it began in 1904, and the shelter was opened on October 5, 1905 (consecrated on November 15, 1905). On the first two floors of the building there was a shelter, named in memory of Adamoviches, for 90 children coming. The third floor houses the former Tsarskoe Selo shelter (which existed since 1842), called the orphanage, for 40 boys.

After the October Revolution, the building housed an orphanage, its first inhabitants were children who suffered from hunger in the Volga region. In time, the orphanage received the name of Stalin. During the Great Patriotic War, the children were evacuated. After the occupation of Pushkin by the Soviet army, the headquarters of the 42nd Army was located in the house. After the war, the building was empty, then it was transferred to accommodate the Leningrad Head Area Computing Center of the Ministry of Communications.

== Architecture ==
The building is brick, three-storeyed on a high basement. In its decoration, red facing brick and light plastering parts, in particular profiled cornices, rods, platbands, rust at the corners of the building and rezalitov are used. The yard facade of the building was rebuilt during the post-war reconstruction.

== Literature ==
- Семенова Г. В. (2009). Царское Село: знакомое и незнакомое. М.: Центрполиграф. p. 292. ISBN 978-5-9524-4249-8.

== Sources ==
- "Октябрьский бульвар 20. Здание Алексеевского приюта ведомства имп. Марии". Энциклопедия Царского Села. Archived from the original on 2018-07-13.
- "Алексеевский детский приют Мариинского ведомства". citywalls.ru. Archived from the original on 2018-07-13.
