= Brulkin's Manor House =

- Усадьба Брылкина
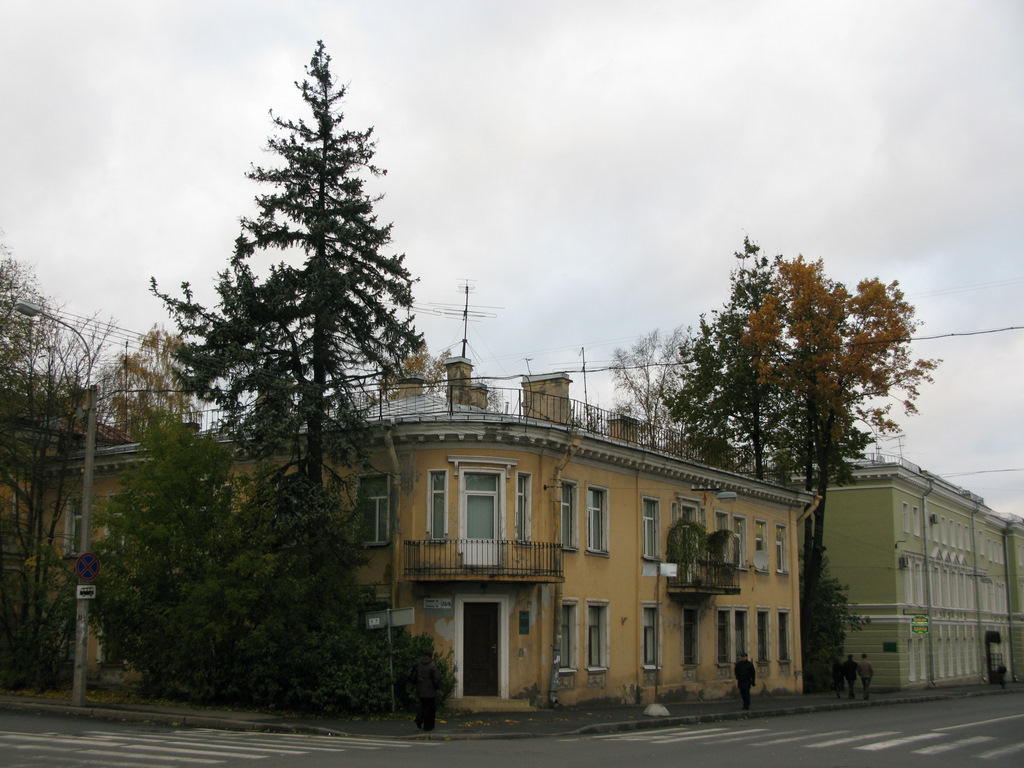
- Interactive map of the Brulkin's Manor House area

General information
- Architectural style: Classicism
- Location: Pushkin, 24, 26/8 Srednaya Street
- Coordinates: 59°43′01″N 30°24′17″E
- Completed: 1810

Brulkin's Manor House is a building of the historical significance in Pushkin, Saint Petersburg. It was built in 1810. Nowadays it is an object of cultural heritage. The building is located on 24, 26/8 Srednaya Street.

== History ==
The first house on the site was built in 1746 according to the project of SI Chevakinsky. A new house on the corner of the streets (present house 26/8) with a brick first floor and a wooden second floor is built (possibly rebuilt) in the 1810s. At the same time, a one-story brick outbuilding, the present house, was built. The likely architect of the houses is VP Stasov. It is known that in 1857 the houses belonged to the widow of the merchant MI Yashumova. In 1877, for the new owner, the out-of-town councilor IA Brylkin, according to the project of architect N.S. Nikitin, the wing was set up on the second floor, and the main house was expanded. At the beginning of the 20th century, the house belonged to NA Tiran, and in it the Tsarskoye Selo Social Assembly was established. After the Great Patriotic War the former main house was rebuilt: a wooden second floor was demolished, instead of it a stone one was built.

== Architecture ==
The main house is built in the style of classicism. The most characteristic is a rounded corner with a triple window, which after reconstruction in stone was reproduced, but was supplemented with a balcony. After the perestroika, the outbuilding acquired the decoration in the spirit of eclecticism. It had a complex roof with a turret-turret and decorative vases in the corners, but these features have since been removed.

== Literature ==
- Семенова Г. В. (2009). Царское Село: знакомое и незнакомое. М.: Центрполиграф. pp. 305–306. ISBN 978-5-9524-4249-8.

== Sources ==
- "Средняя 24, 26. Усадьба Брылкина". Энциклопедия Царского Села. Archived from the original on 2018-07-03.
- "Городская усадьба И. А. Брылкина. Главный дом". citywalls.ru.
- "Городская усадьба И. А. Брылкина. Флигель". citywalls.ru.
