= Court Riding Arena =

Building in Saint Petersburg, Russia

- Придворный манеж
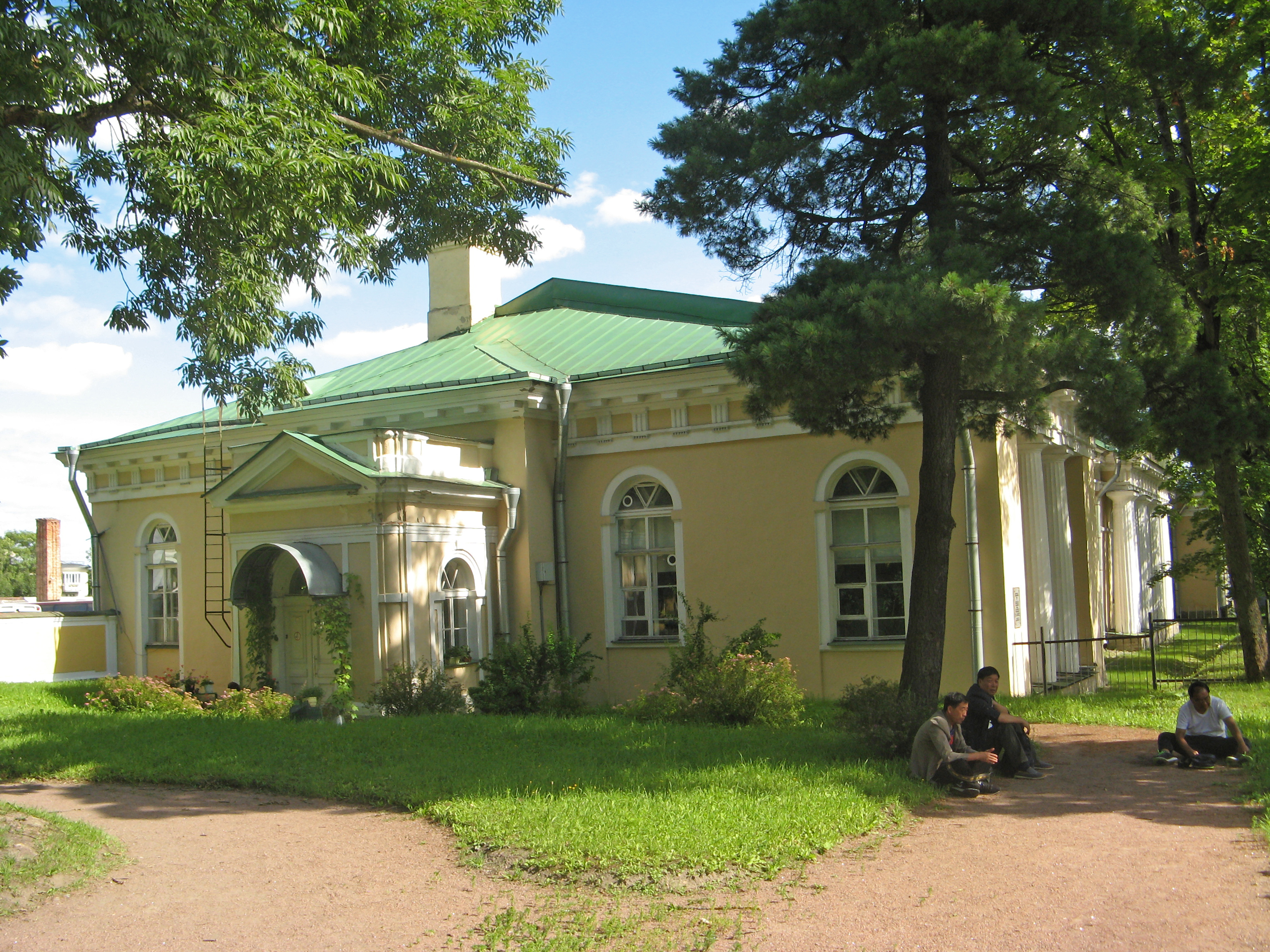
- Interactive map of the Court Riding Arena area

General information
- Architectural style: Neoclassical
- Location: Pushkin, 16 Sadovaya Street
- Coordinates: 59°42′53″N 30°24′21″E
- Construction started: 1786
- Completed: 1819

Design and construction
- Architects: I. V. Neelov, Vasily Stasov

The Court Riding Arena (Russian: Придворный манеж) is an historic building in Pushkin, Saint Petersburg that was once used as riding hall by the Russian Imperial family and court.

The riding hall was built in 1786, and rebuilt in 1819. It is listed as an object of cultural heritage. The building is located on 16 Sadovaya Street.

== History ==
The first structure on the site was a wooden building erected in the middle of the 18th century by Savva Chevakinsky. It was replaced by a stone building built in 1786-1788 by I. V. Neelov. The building quickly deteriorated. Vasily Stasov, who was entrusted with repairs, instead decided on a complete rebuilding, retaining only part of the walls and increasing the size of the building. Rebuilding was completed by November 1819.

From September 1820, it was used as a riding hall by the Imperial court. It was intended for horse exercises by the officers of the retinue and the imperial convoy, and also by regiments of the Imperial Guard, which were quartered in Tsarskoye Selo.

After the October Revolution, the arena was used as a People's Theater, where, among others, Feodor Chaliapin performed. It later housed mechanical workshops. In 1949, a gym was built there.

Today the court arena hosts sporting events. Restoration was carried out in 1951 and in 2010.

== Architecture ==
The court arena is an extended one-story building. In the center is a Doric portico of eight columns, grouped in pairs. This has been preserved from Neelov's design, although Stasov reduced the height of the pediment.

On the ends of the longitudinal facades are loggias. The windows after the restructuring of Stasov became semi-circular, lacking platbands. At the front facades, attics were constructed, but they no longer exist. The facades are decorated with a frieze with triglyphs.

== Sources ==
- "Садовая 16. Придворный манеж". Энциклопедия Царского Села (in Russian). Archived from the original on 1 July 2018.
- "Придворный манеж". citywalls.ru (in Russian).
