= Residential House of Police Officers =

- Жилой дом полицейских чинов
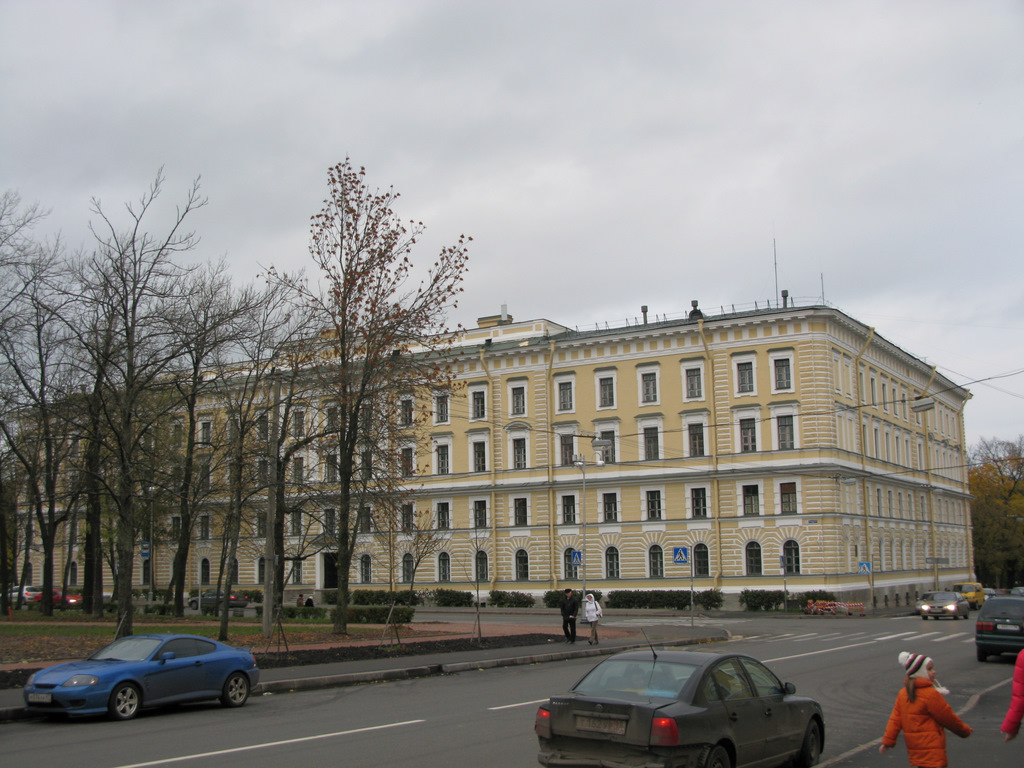
- Interactive map of the Residential House of Police Officers area

General information
- Architectural style: Eclecticism
- Location: Pushkin, 32/24 Pushkinskaya Street
- Coordinates: 59°43′15″N 30°24′34″E
- Construction started: 1899
- Completed: 1901

Design and construction
- Architect: A. R. Bach

The Residential House of Police Officers is a historic building in Pushkin, Saint Petersburg, Russia, that was built between 1889 and 1901 as a residence for policemen serving the royal palace.

Today the police residence is an object of cultural heritage. The building is located on 32/24 Pushkinskaya Street on the north side of Saint Isaac's Square.

== History ==
The building was originally occupied by the Material Yard, where warehouses and workshops were located and their employees lived. The need for a police residence arose because the Tsar and his court stayed at Tsarskoe Selo only six months per year. This forced the palace police to rent apartments for their families in more than one locality.

On the instructions of the Governor of the Tsarskoye Selo Palace, the residence construction was carried out by the architect A. R. Bach and paid for by the Ministry of the Imperial Court. The residence was solemnly laid on July 20, 1899. By the summer of 1901, it was finished.

During the 1920s, the police residence was transferred to the St. Petersburg State Agricultural University, which turned it into a student hostel. In July 1924, the building housed a student literary circle that was frequently visited by Sergei Esenin.

The police residence remained a hostel until 1997, when the University began reconstruction.

== Architecture ==
The police residence is a four-story building decorated in eclectic style. The building housed 70 apartments, it was supplied with electricity, central heating, lift, and mechanical ventilation. In the basement was a laundry. The building has mosaic floors and terrazzo slabs that were supplied by the firm "Brothers Botta".

== Literature ==
- Семенова Г. В. (2009). Царское Село: знакомое и незнакомое. М.: Центрполиграф. pp. 366–369. ISBN 978-5-9524-4249-8.

== Sources ==
- "Пушкинская 32. Жилой дом семейных городовых дворцовой полиции". Энциклопедия Царского Села. Archived from the original on 2018-07-11.
- "Жилой дом полицейских чинов Дворцовой полиции (Дом городовых)". citywalls.ru.
