= Egyptian Gate of Tsarskoye Selo =

Russian gate

Coordinates: 59.7293°N 30.3946°E

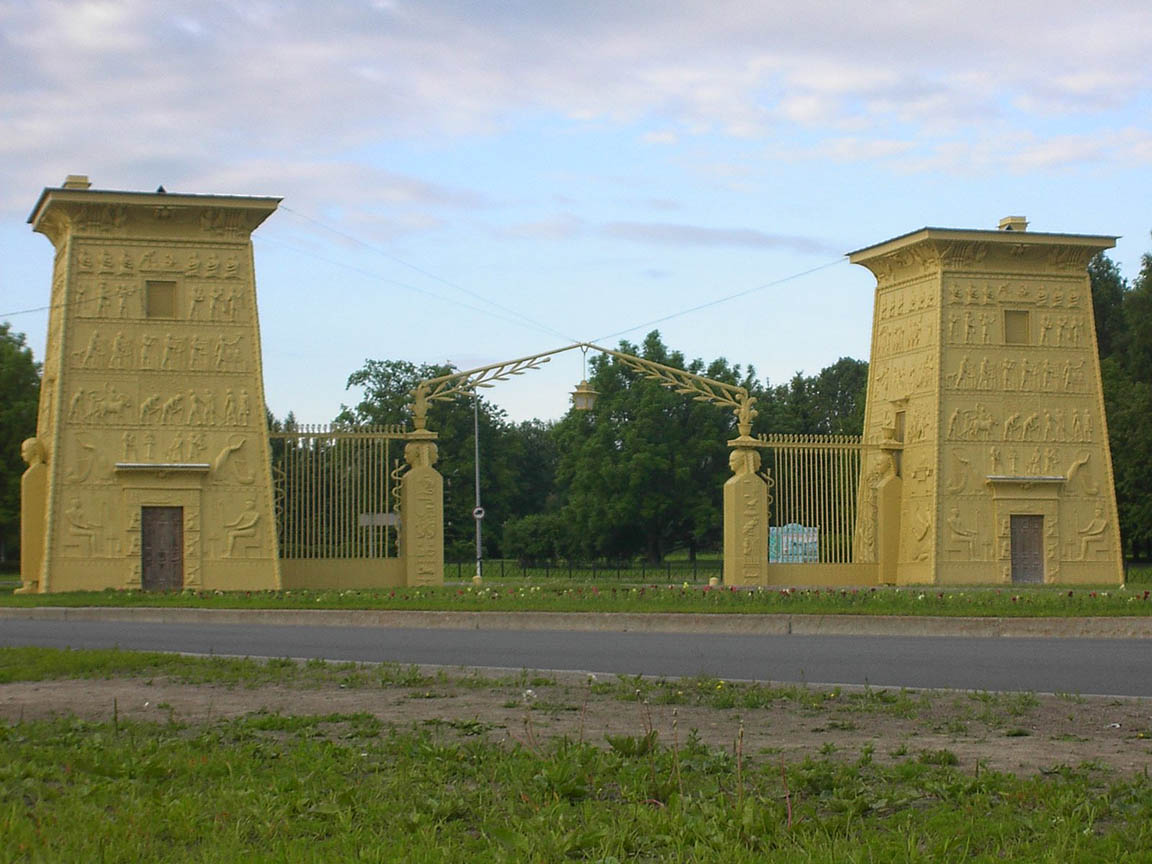
The Egyptian Gate in Tsarskoe Selo

The Egyptian Gate of Tsarskoye Selo was built in 1829 to replace the old toll bar, which had been made redundant by the expansion of Tsarskoe Selo.

The gate, which exemplifies the Egyptian Revival style, was designed by Adam Menelaws, who was inspired by the Temple of Khonsu gates. The hieroglyphs were modeled by professor Demut-Malinovsky. The iron gate and the cast iron columns and plates, covered with hieroglyphs, were cast in St. Petersburg at the Alexander Iron Works. The Alexander Park extended to this gate until 1895, when part of it was used for the building of barracks.

The large scale pylonesque is made of brick on one side and cast iron reliefs on the other. The drawings on the gates are carved and polished.

The style seen in the Egyptian Gates was very typical of that time. Due to the French expeditions in Egypt, the world became more interested in ancient Egyptian architecture. The hieroglyphs on the gate were included in part to show that the Russians were interested in supporting the scholars that were researching the language.
