= Olenins' House =

- Дом Олениных
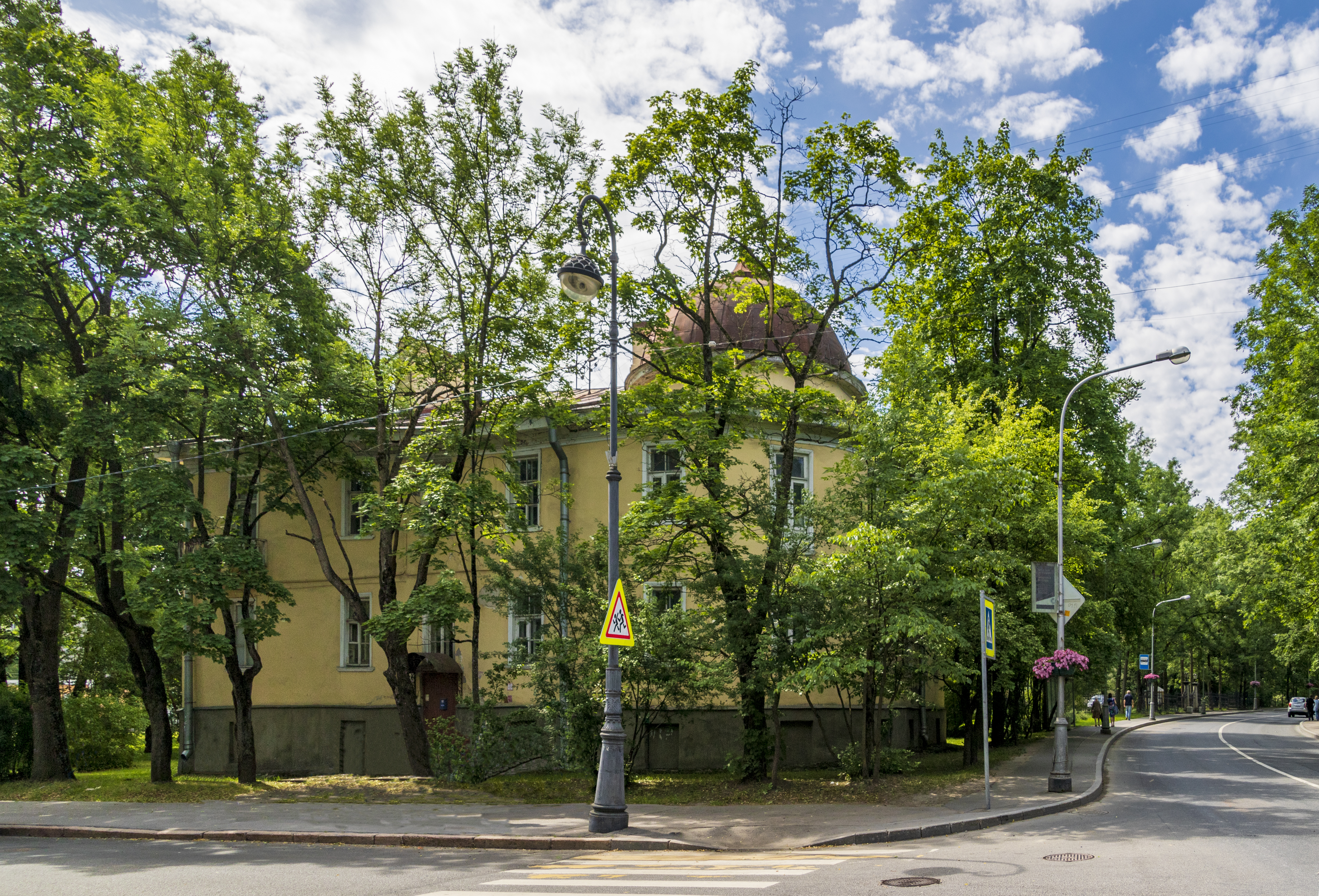
- Interactive map of the Olenins' House area

General information
- Architectural style: Classicism
- Location: Pushkin, 1/17 Pushkinskaya Street
- Coordinates: 59°43′25″N 30°23′59″E
- Completed: 1828

Design and construction
- Architects: N.S. Nikitin, V. M. Gornostayev

Olenins' House is a building of the historical significance in Pushkin, Saint Petersburg. It was built in the period of 1828. Nowadays it is an object of cultural heritage. The building is located on 1/17 Pushkinskaya Street.

== History ==
The house was built in 1828 by architect VM Gornostaev for the court stoker Agafonov. Since 1831 the house belongs to the family of Olenins. In their house in Tsarskoe Selo there was AS Pushkin. In 1845, on behalf of the widow of the actual State Councilor VA Olenina, architect N. Nikitin built a wooden top with a mezzanine. In 1907, the sanatorium of the Holy Trinity Community of Sisters of Mercy was placed in the house. When the building was converted by engineer Lundberg, the mezzanine was rebuilt into a tower with a dome. With the outbreak of the First World War, the community also equipped a small infirmary there, with 15 soldiers. After the October Revolution, the sanatorium was also housed in the house. In 1921 Anna Akhmatova lived there. It was in this sanatorium that she learned about the death of her first husband, Nikolai Gumilev, and his brother, Andrei Gorenko.

== Architecture ==
The house is two-story, it faces the two streets. The corner of the house is rounded, crowned by a dome with a tower. On the tower in 1999 was placed a weather vane in the form of a rooster, symbolizing the golden cockerel from Pushkin's fairy tale, to the anniversary of which he was presented to the city.

== Literature ==
- Семенова Г. В. (2009). Царское Село: знакомое и незнакомое [Tsarskoye Selo: the familiar and the unfamiliar] (in Russian). М.: Центрполиграф. ISBN 978-5-9524-4249-8.
- Малинский, Д.А; Малинская, Е.Е. (2004). Пушкин. Справочник-путеводитель по городу [Pushkin. City guide-guidebook] (in Russian). СПб. ISBN 978-5-93808-087-4.

== Sources ==
- "Пушкинская 1 / Дворцовая 17. Дом Олениных (Дом Агафонова)". Энциклопедия Царского Села. Archived from the original on 2018-07-09.
- "Дом Олениных - Санаторий Свято-Троицкой Общины сестер милосердия". citywalls.ru.
