= Vuyich's House =

Building in Pushkin, Saint Petersburg, Russia

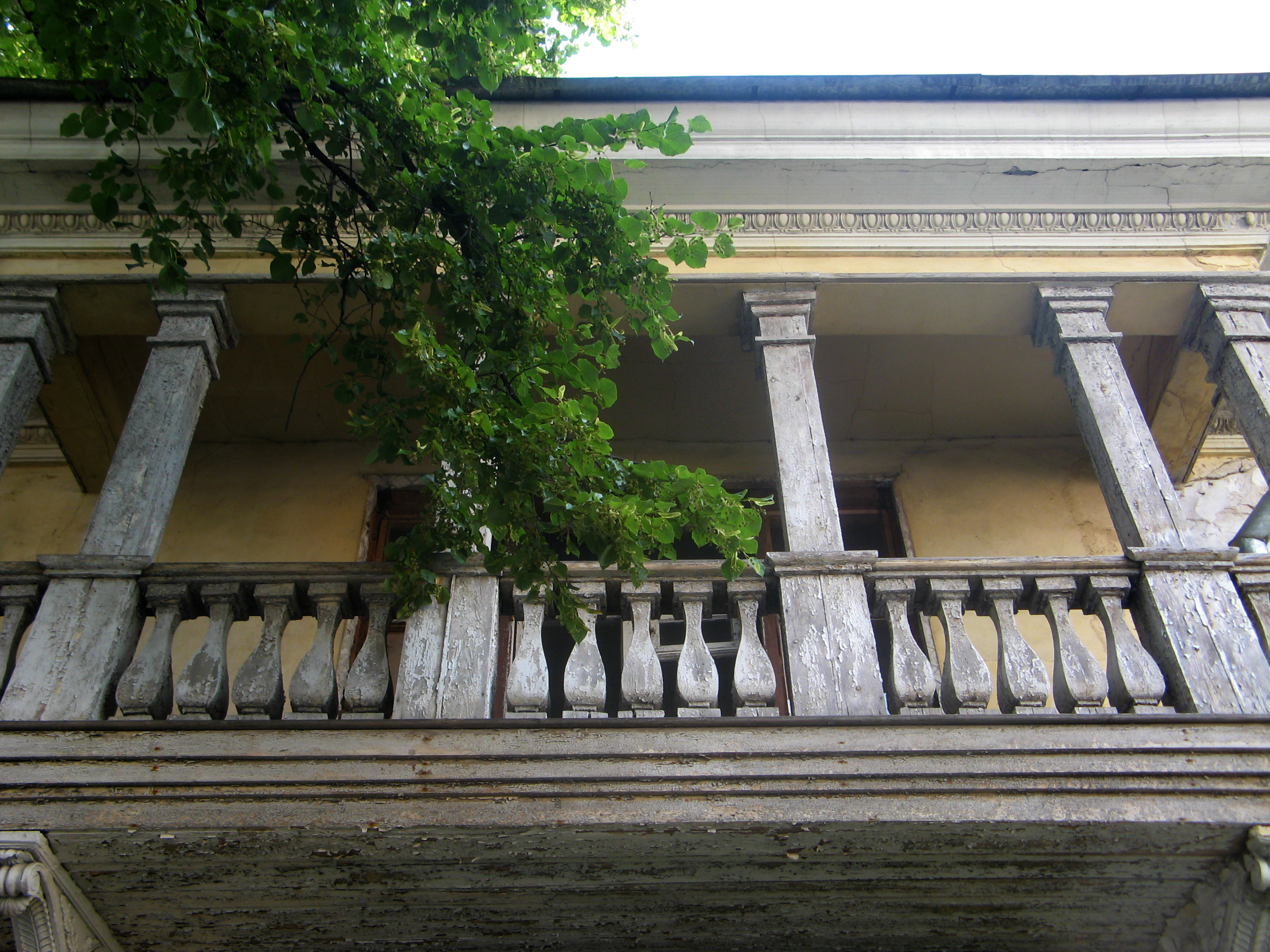
- Interactive map of the Vuyich's House area

General information
- Architectural style: Eclecticism
- Location: 6 Cerkovnaya Street
- Coordinates: 59°43′10″N 30°24′13″E
- Completed: 1880s

Design and construction
- Architect: A. F. Vidov

Vuyich's House is a building of cultural and historical significance in Pushkin, Saint Petersburg, Russia, which was built in the 1880s.

== History ==
The site was originally the garden of a house belonging to Ludwig-Wilhelm Tepper de Ferguson. The existing wooden house was constructed in the 1880s as designed by architect A. F. Vidov for state counsellor Vasily Ivanovich Vuyich. After the 1917 October Revolution, the house was converted into an apartment lot. The lot was later sold to Countess EI Igelstrom.

From 1930 to 1938, writer Aleksey Tolstoy lived in the house. During this time, he worked on the novel Peter the First, the trilogy The Road to Calvary, and his other works. The second floor hosted his office. Writers and artists often visited him, and their circle was known as the 'Detskoye Selo art colony'.

After Tolstoy's departure in 1938, the building served as the House of Creativity for Leningrad writers. Soon after the outbreak of World War II, the building was turned into the editorial office of the newspaper For the Soviet Motherland of the 1st Kirov Division of the Leningrad People's Militia. The house was seriously damaged in the war, the roof was destroyed, the windows were broken, and the panelling was partially dismantled for firewood.

After restoration, the house hosted a kindergarten and a recreation center and Leningrad's main waterworks. Afterwards, the house sat empty for a long time and was threatened with demolition. Through the efforts of the public, it was recognized as an architectural monument and handed over to the Pushkin Historical and Literary Museum.

== Architecture ==
The house is a wooden two-story structure with a stone basement. The walls are plaster on shingles. The main facade contains a balcony on carved brackets, with wooden columns and carved balusters. The facade is also ornamented with profiled rods and a horizontal band along the walls.

== Bibliography ==
- Семенова Г. В. (2009). Царское Село: знакомое и незнакомое. М.: Центрполиграф. p. 395. ISBN 978-5-9524-4249-8.
- Бунатян Г. Г. (1975). Город муз. Л.: Лениздат. pp. 318–343.
