= Kitaev's House =

- Дом Китаева
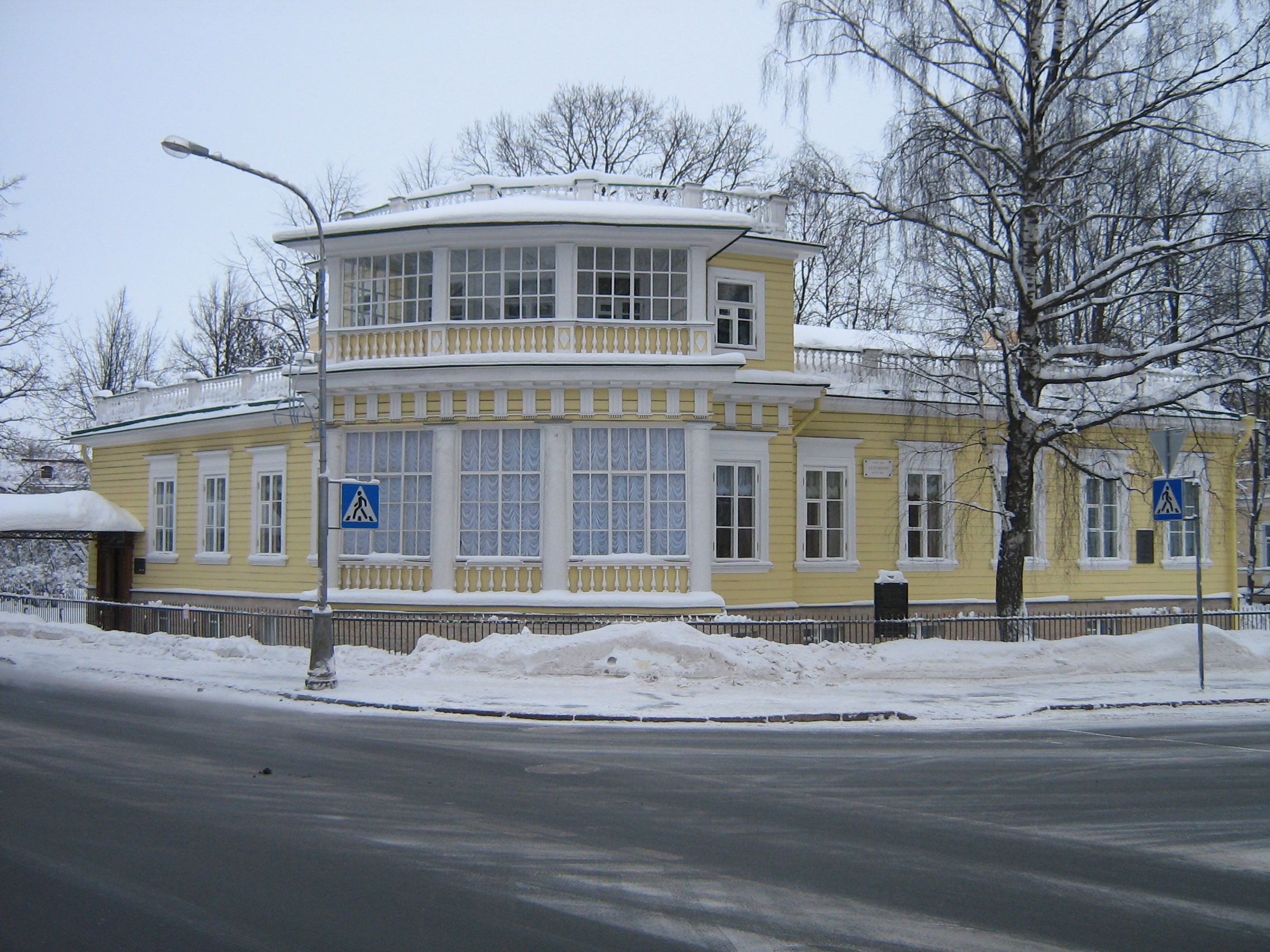
- Interactive map of the Kitaev's House area

General information
- Architectural style: Empire style
- Location: Pushkin, 2/19 Pushkinskaya Street
- Coordinates: 59°43′27″N 30°24′00″E
- Completed: 1827

Design and construction
- Architect: A. M. Gornostayev

Kitaev's House is a building of historical significance in Pushkin, Saint Petersburg. It was built in 1827, and has since been registered as a cultural heritage object. The building is located on 2/19 Pushkinskaya Street.

== History ==
The house was built in 1827 by the architect V. M. Gornostaev for the court footman Yakov Kitaev, the valet of Nicholas I. Kitaev died in 1831, and the house passed to his widow Anna Kitaeva. In the same year, Alexander Pushkin and his wife spent the summer and autumn in the house. At this time Pushkin worked on The Tale of Tsar Saltan, completed the novel Eugene Onegin, began to write the novel Roslavlev, and also prepared The Story of Belkin for publication.

Among the other owners of the house are: Vera Pryanishnikova, the wife of the real secret counselor (1857), Fedor Ivanovich Pryanishnikov (1866), daughter of the merchant Olga Skryabin (1870). In 1877, the wife of the state councilor Olga Vladimirovna Ivanova bought it from the latter, which she owned until the October Revolution of 1917. She undertook various building work: the portico on the corner of the house was turned into a glazed gallery, the house was expanded along the facade into two windows on both sides. In 1910, a memorial plaque was placed on the house in memory of Pushkin's residence. Since 1917, the house has housed a holiday home for sisters of mercy, and since 1920, the acclimatization station of the Supreme Council of National Economy was located here. Since 1931, the house has been inhabited. In the Great Patriotic War, it was seriously damaged but rebuilt. In 1958, the house opened a museum "Dacha AS Pushkin", and in 1976, the house was completely transferred to the museum.

== Architecture ==
The house is wooden, with a rounded mezzanine at the corner. Before the restructuring, the corner formed a curved portico, otherwise the balcony of the mezzanine was decorated. During the restoration for the museum, the living room, the dining room and the pantry were restored according to the historical design and memoirs of contemporaries. Later, the boudoir and the bedroom were also restored. The rooms are furnished with furniture of Pushkin's time.

== Literature ==
- Широкий В. Ф. (1936). Дача А. С. Пушкина в Царском Селе (дом Китаева). Л.: Пушкинское общество.

== Sources ==
- "Пушкинская 2. Дом Китаева (Музей Пушкина)". Энциклопедия Царского Села. Archived from the original on November 21, 2017.
- "Дача Я. Китаева - Дача А. К. Китаевой - Музей "Дача А. С. Пушкина"". citywalls.ru. Archived from the original on 2019-06-07.
