= Gostiny dvor, Pushkin =

Gostiny dvor
- Гостиный двор
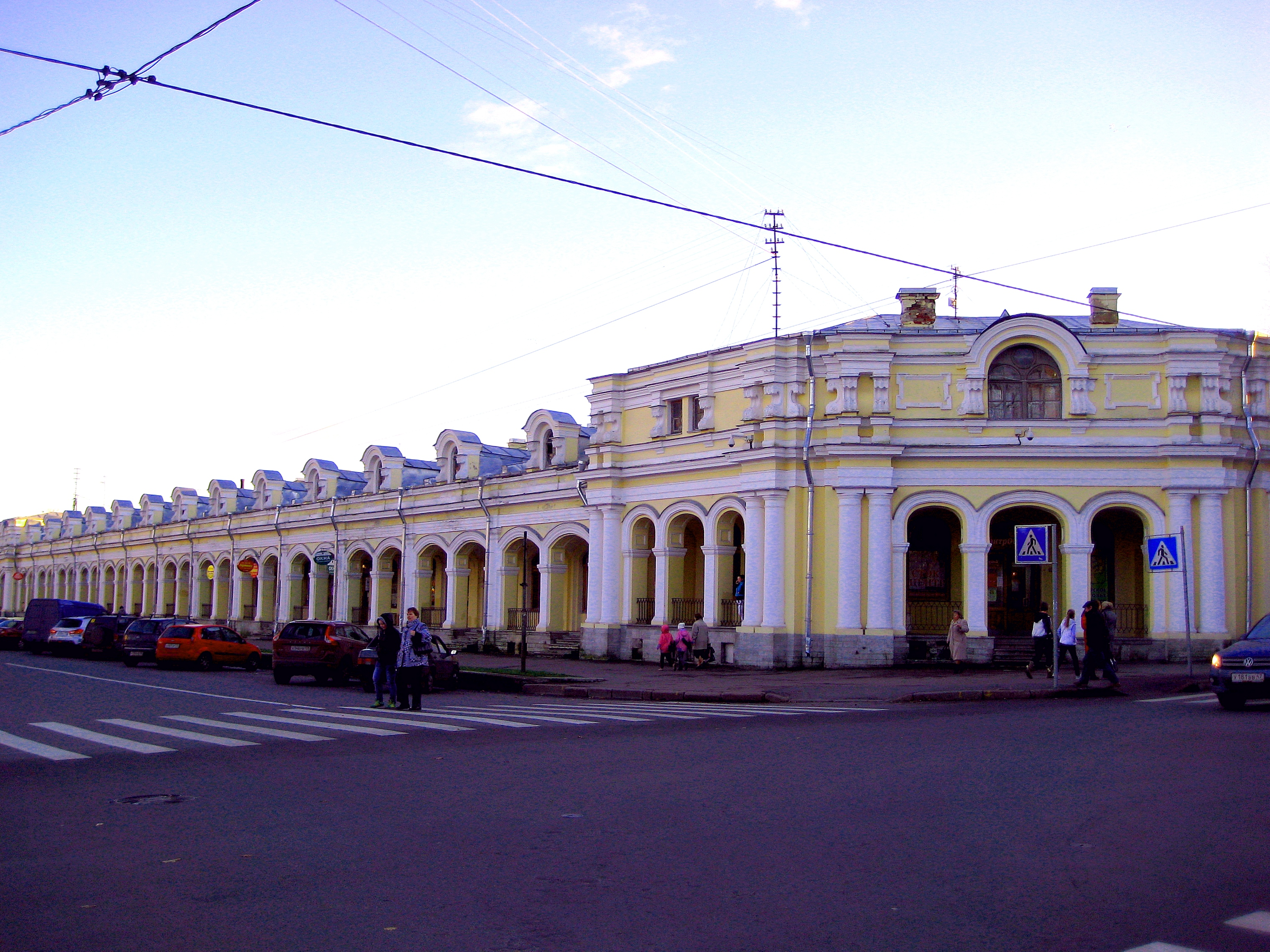
- Interactive map of the Gostiny dvor area

General information
- Location: Pushkin, 25 Moskovskaya Street
- Coordinates: 59°43′10″N 30°24′21″E
- Construction started: 1863
- Completed: 1866

Design and construction
- Architect: N. S. Nikitin

Gostiny dvor is a building of the historical significance in Pushkin, Saint Petersburg. It was built in the period of 1863-1866. Nowadays it is an object of cultural heritage. The building is located on 25 Moskovskaya Street.

== History ==
The Gostiny Dvor in Tsarskoye Selo was established in 1818, when, on the orders of Ya. V. Zakharzhevsky, the shops from the Znamensky Church were moved to the present place, and the Konstantinov Fair from Sofia. According to the plan of Tsarskoe Selo VI Gest, a large plot was assigned from Leontievskaya to Orangareynaya Street. The wooden one-story building of the Gostiny Dvor in 1825 was built by V.P. Stasov. William Heste participated in the design. In the years 1843-1844. built stone Meat rows in the courtyard of the complex, the architect was NS Nikitin. In 1862, most of the wooden complex was destroyed by fire. Initially, it was proposed to restore only the burnt part, the project was prepared by A.F. Vidov. However, as a result, it was decided to rebuild the stone building, this was entrusted to the same N.S. Nikitin. The building was opened for trade in 1866. In 1898, under the project of architect A. R. Bach, a stone terrace was built to increase the rigidity of the foundation and prevent deformation due to the relief dip. In the years 1911-1912. the same A. R. Bach in the courtyard was built from a concrete glacier-warehouse. The Gostiny Dvor complex continues to be used for trade and now, from the yard side the Tsarskoye Selo market is located.

== Architecture ==
All facades of the main one-story building of the complex are surrounded by an arched gallery. In the central part of the building, on the axis of Cathedral Square, there is a travel arch-portal. The outlines of arches of galleries on different facades are various. The corners and arches of the building are decorated with pavilions with attic mezzanines and bundles of twin columns of the Tuscan order. The decor of the building is complicated, which brings it closer to the Baroque style. Above the slope of the roof there are a lot of mansard windows.

The building of the Meat series has a semi-circular shape. It is oriented along the main axis of the complex. Decorated in the style of late classicism. The concave facade is decorated with a gallery with pillars cross-shaped in cross-section, with shoulder blades and pilasters of the Tuscan warrant. The ends of the building, designed for fish shops, decorate the triangular pediments.

== Literature ==
- Семенова Г. В. (2009). Царское Село: знакомое и незнакомое. М.: Центрполиграф. pp. 356–360. ISBN 978-5-9524-4249-8.

== Sources ==
- "Московская 25. Гостиный двор". Энциклопедия Царского Села. Archived from the original on 2018-07-08.
- "Царскосельский Гостиный двор". citywalls.ru.
