= Pushkin, Saint Petersburg =

Pushkin Пушкин
- Municipal town
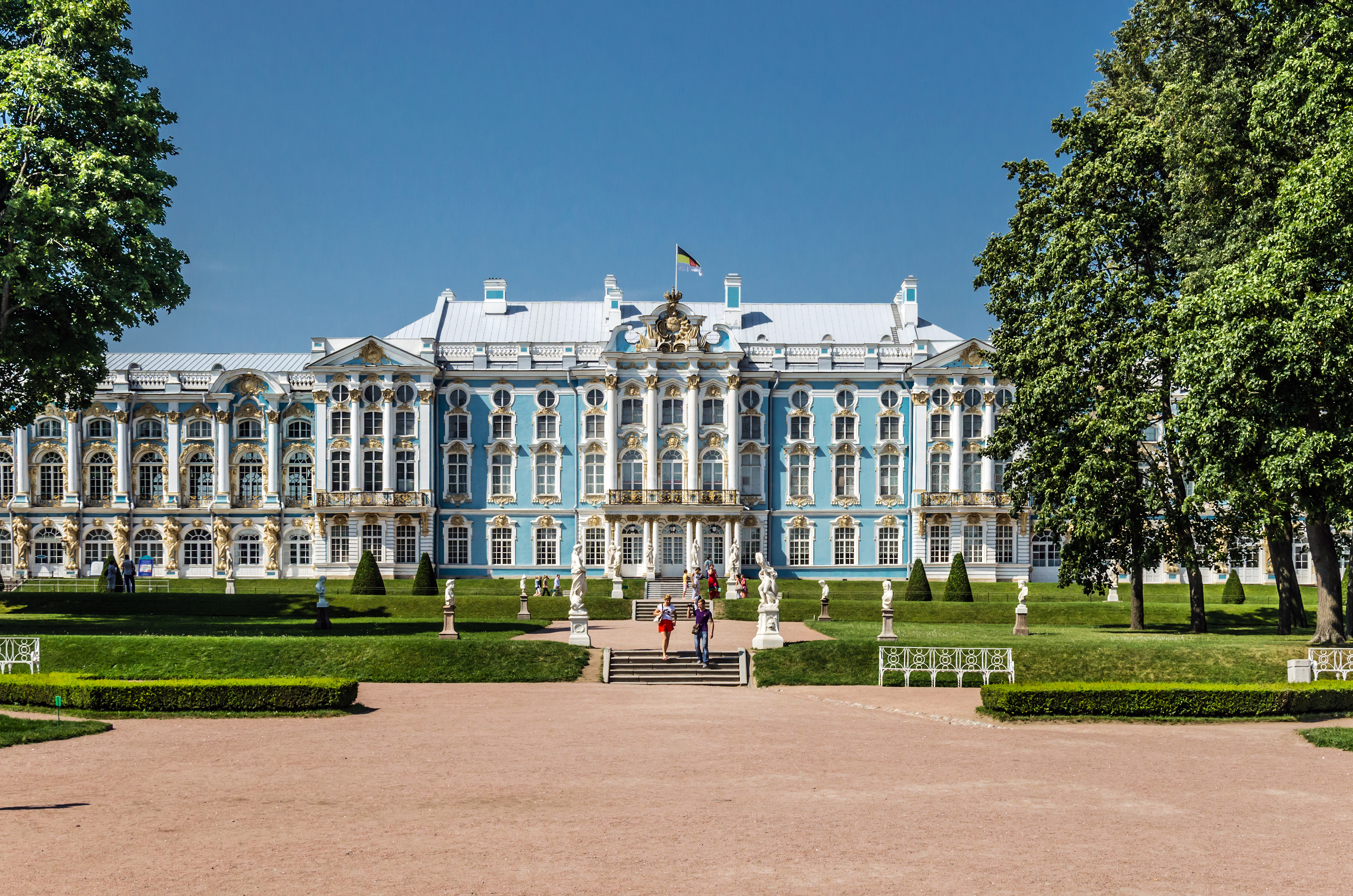
- Catherine Palace

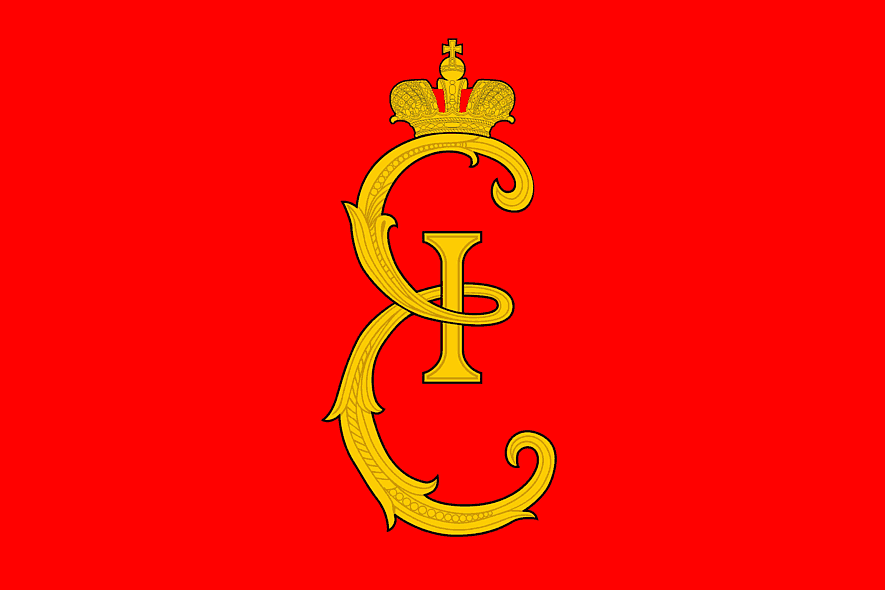
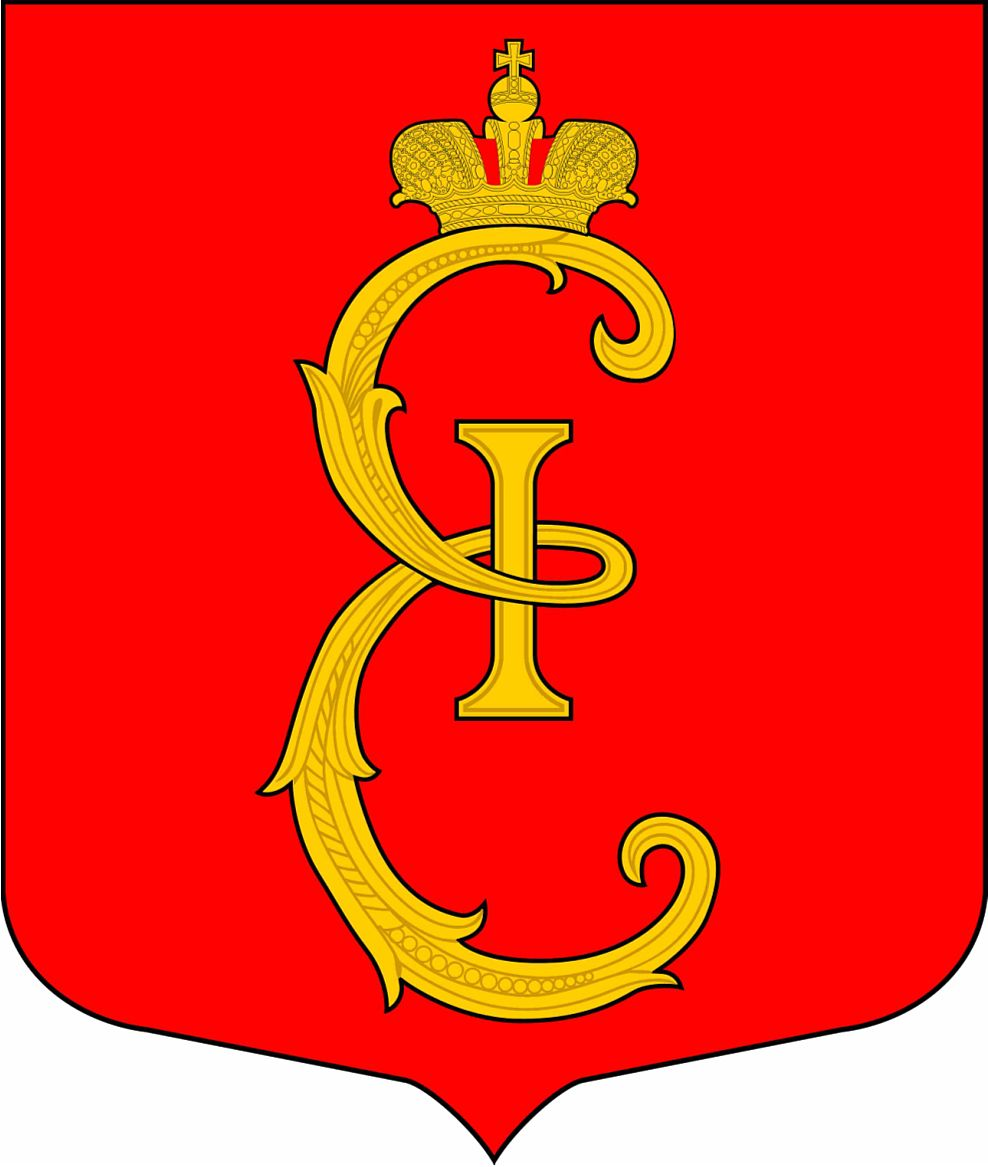
- Flag Coat of arms
- Interactive map of Pushkin
- Location of Pushkin Pushkin (Saint Petersburg)
- Coordinates: 59°44′N 30°23′E
- Country: Russia
- Federal subject: Saint Petersburg
- Founded: 1710 (1808)

Government
  - Body: Municipal Urban Council

Area
  - Total: 201 km^{2} (78 sq mi)

Population (2010 Census)
  - Total: 92,889
  - Estimate (2023): 108,187 (+16.5%)
  - Density: 462/km^{2} (1,200/sq mi)
- Time zone: UTC+
- Postal code: 196600
- Dialing code: +7 812
- OKTMO ID: 40397000
- Municipal town Day: June 24
- Website: www.pushkin-town.net

Pushkin (Russian: Пу́шкин) is a municipal town in Pushkinsky District of the federal city of St. Petersburg, Russia, located 24 kilometers (15 mi) south from the center of St. Petersburg proper, and its railway station, Tsarskoye Selo, is directly connected by railway to the Vitebsky Rail Terminal of the city.

Pushkin was founded in 1710 as an imperial residence named Tsarskoye Selo (Russian: Ца́рское Село́, lit. 'Tsar's Village') and received status of a town in 1808. The first public railways in Russia, Tsarskoye Selo Railways, were opened here in 1837 and connected the town to the capital, St. Petersburg. After the October Revolution, the town was renamed to Detskoye Selo (Russian: Де́тское Село́, romanized: Children's Village). Its name was further changed in 1937 to Pushkin to commemorate the 100th anniversary of the death of the Russian poet Alexander Pushkin. The town contains an ensemble of the 18th century Tsarskoye Selo. This museum complex includes the Catherine Palace, Alexander Palace and other buildings and associated parks; it is a major tourist attraction in the area and is included in the list of monuments protected by the UNESCO.

== History ==
=== Establishment of a settlement ===
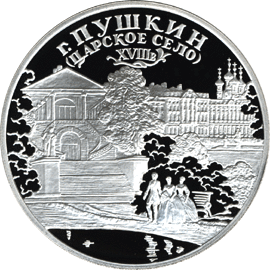
Three-ruble memorial coin of the Bank of Russia

In 1609–1702, on the place of Catherine Palace stood a Swedish estate, which in Finnish was known as Saaren moisio (Estonian: Saare mõis). Traditionally Ingrian Finns have called the area as Saaren kylä (village of Saari) or Saari, meaning "island" in Finnish (Estonian: Saar). It was a small estate, which consisted of a wooden house, household annexes, and a modest garden divided by two perpendicular avenues into four squares. This estate originated from an earlier settlement, which was mentioned in church inventories of 1501 and marked on maps drawn for Boris Godunov as Saritsa (Russian: Сарица). This name later transformed to Sarskaya Manor (Russian: Сарская мыза), then to Saar Village, and finally became the Sarskoye Selo, which easily developed further as Tsarskoye Selo (meaning "Tsar's Village" in Russian).

After the expulsion of the Swedes from the area Peter the Great gave the manor to Alexander Menshikov. Later, by an official decree of 13 June 1710 the whole area including 43 villages was assigned to Marfa Skavronskaya, wife of Peter who later became Empress Catherine I. This date of 13 June 1710 is considered as the founding date of the city. In 1717–1724 the architect Johann Braunstein built here a two-storied stone palace surrounded by ancillary buildings, and Y. V. Roozen created a garden with two ponds at the palace. Because of the growing number of servants, a separate village and a wooden Uspenskaya Church (1716) were built nearby. Around then the Sarskaya Mansion transformed into Tsarskoye Selo. The first street of the city, Perednyaya Street (meaning "Front Street", now Sadovaya Street) was established in 1720. Construction of the Znamenskaya Church, the oldest stone building in the city, started in 1734.

=== Imperial residence ===
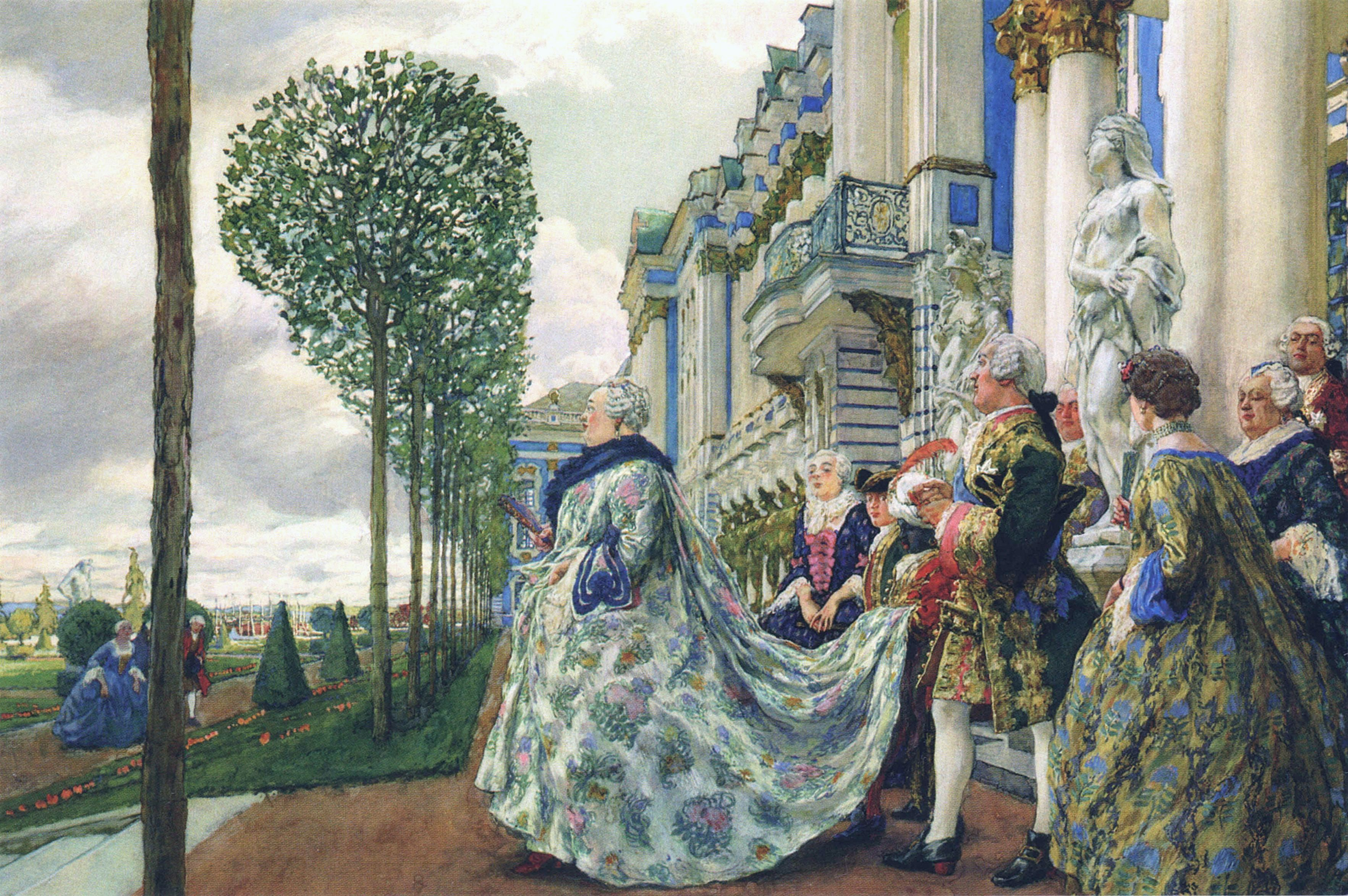
Empress Elizabeth of Russia in Tsarskoye Selo (Eugene Lanceray, gouache, 1905)

During the reign of Elizabeth, Tsarskoye Selo became the imperial residence. In 1740-50s the modest palace of Catherine I was rebuilt into a luxurious summer residence, the Catherine Palace. Between 1751 and 1756 the reconstruction was led by Francesco Bartolomeo Rastrelli, and the present look of the palace has not changed much since then. In 1755, the Amber Room was moved from the Winter Palace to the Catherine Palace. The gardens were extended and decorated with sculptures and pavilions. A canal was dug from Vittolovsky Springs (6 kilometres (4 miles) from the Tsarskoye Selo) to provide water for the park ponds, and several stone houses were built on the Perednyaya Street.

The inflow of people to the area in the 1770s urged Catherine II to separate the Tsarskoye Selo from the urban area. By the decree of January 1780 she established a town Sofia nearby with a separate administration. Further construction works without imperial orders were banned in Tsarskoye Selo and most merchants and clergy were moved to Sofia. The town was divided into rectangular districts with a vast open place in the center. A wooden church of Saints Constantine and Helen and then the stone Sophia Cathedral (1788) were raised in the town center. According to Johann Gottlieb Georgi, in 1794, Sofia was mostly populated by the palace workers and peasants. It had a number of stone buildings, a church resembling Hagia Sophia of Constantinople, and a factory in the suburbs producing paper for state bank notes. The town prospered owing to the proximity of St. Petersburg and imperial attention.

=== Town ===
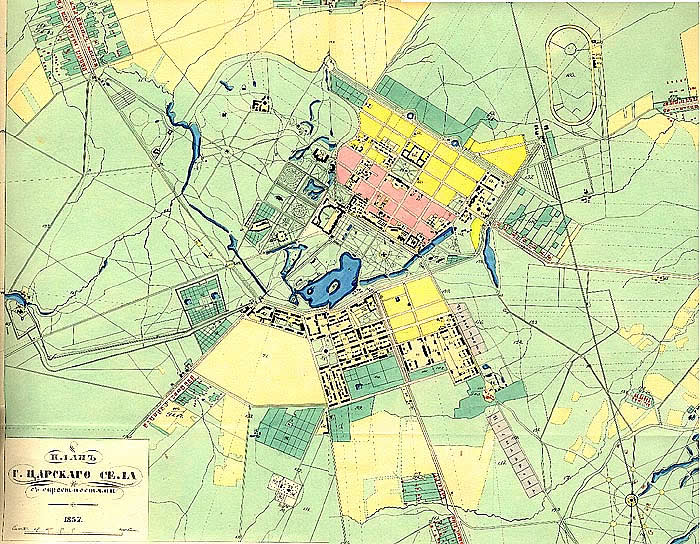
Map of the Tsarskoye Selo area (1858)

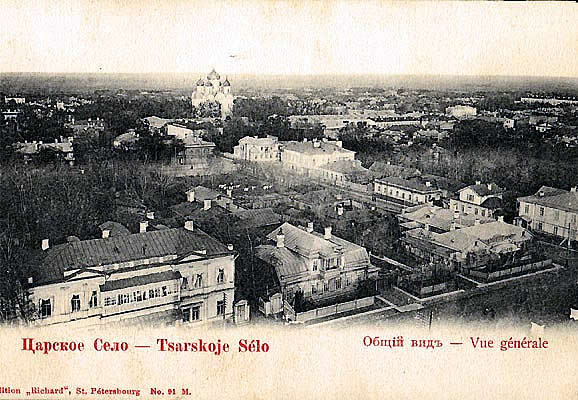
Tsarskoye Selo, postcard of 1904

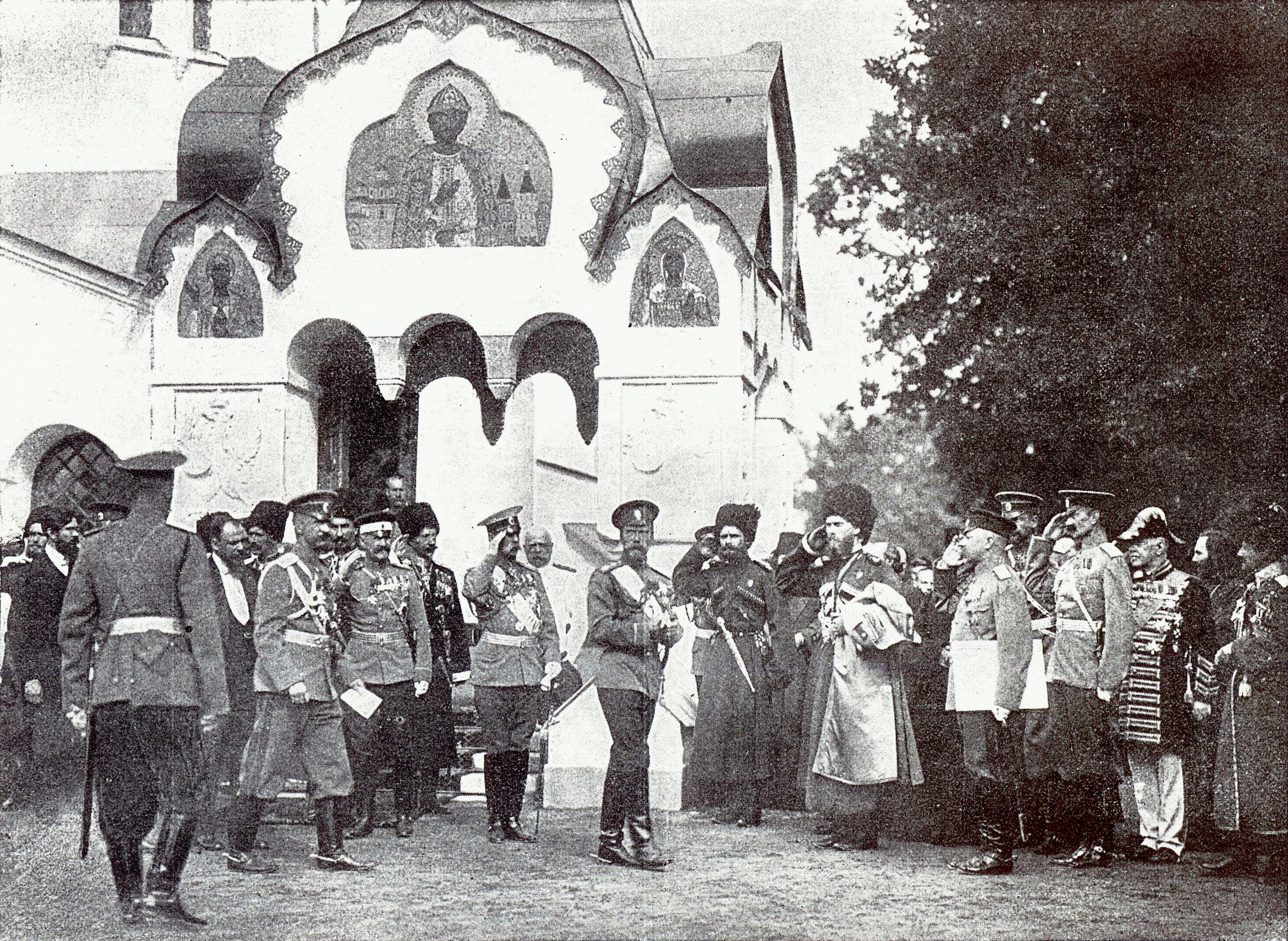
Nicholas II meets deputies after the consecration of the Fyodor Cathedral (1912)

A new park which later became Alexander Park was established in the 1770s to the west of the Catherine Palace, and in 1792–1795 Giacomo Quarenghi built the Alexander Palace at the north-eastern border of the park for the future emperor Alexander I. In 1808, Alexander I merged the Tsarskoye Selo with Sofia and proclaimed it a town and the seat of Tsarskoselsky Uyezd. In 1808, he appointed William Heste as the town architect, which post he held until his death in 1832. Heste compiled a master plan for Tsarskoye Selo, with division into quarters and associated gardens and orchards. Most residents moved from Sofia to Tsarskoye Selo and the former was converted to a residence of a military regiment. By 1817, Tsarskoye Selo had 15 streets, 354 buildings and a population of 4,000.

The Catherine Palace suffered from the fire of 1820 and was reconstructed by the architect Vasily Stasov. He also designed several buildings in classical style, namely the Manezh, Stable Building and Grand Orangery. Between 1811 and 1843 a wing of the Catherine Palace hosted the Tsarskoye Selo Lyceum where Aleksandr Pushkin studied between 1811 and 1817. Several historical objects were created in those decades including the iron Egyptian gates by Adam Menelaws.

The first public railway in the Russian Empire, Tsarskoselskaya Railway, was laid in 1837 and connected Tsarskoye Selo with the capital St. Petersburg. Its length was about 22.5 km (14.0 mi) and the journey time about 40 minutes. The prominent Catherine Cathedral was built in 1840. The town was expanding and by 1855 had 44 streets, 10 churches, 400 houses, 8 military barracks, 3 hospitals and a female seminary. Tsarskoye Selo was one of the most developed cities of Russia. In 1887 it became the first fully electrified town in Europe, and by the end of the 19th century had a telephone network.

In 1905, the Alexander Palace became the main residence of the Nicholas II. Here the royal family was held under house arrest after the February Revolution. In 1902–1908 the town was equipped with the most advanced by the time water system with a separate sewer network and a water purification station. By 1909 the town had 30,000 residents and 19 schools. In 1910, an Imperial garrison camp was established to the north of the Catherine Palace, on the border of Alexander Park and the city. It had a separate cathedral (Fedorovskiy Cathedral), a dining hall, and two hospitals, one for officers and one for soldiers. The first bus route was opened in 1911, and in 1914 a powerful for the time 300-kilowatt wireless telegraphy station was built in the city. Léon Theremin worked at that station in 1918–1919.

=== Soviet period ===
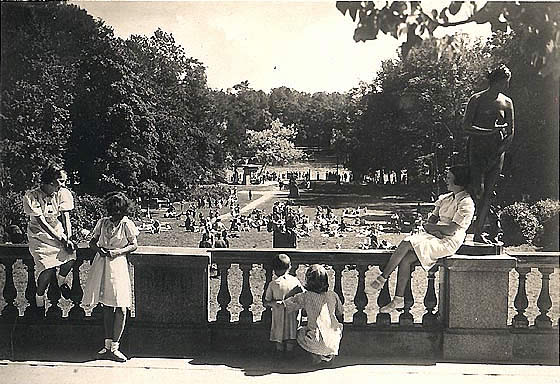
Catherine Park (1939)

In 1918, after the October Revolution, the palace and park complex was declared as museum and national property. On 7 November 1918 it was renamed to Detskoye Selo (Russian: Детское Село, "Children's Village"), because of the large number of children's institutions established in the area, and due to a general trend to rename Tsar-related geographical names. On 10 February 1937, on the occasion of the 100-year anniversary of the death of Aleksandr Pushkin, the town was given his name. On 10 June 1939, the Catherine Cathedral was demolished by the Soviet authorities.

After the start of World War II, on 17 September 1941, the town was occupied by the German troops. Several buildings of the palace complex were destroyed or damaged and many artworks were abducted, including the entire inner decoration of the Amber Room. The town was liberated on 24 January 1944 as a result of the Krasnoye Selo–Ropsha Offensive.

Restoration of the palace complex was initiated already during the war. Public access was gradually re-established to the parks (1946), lyceum (1949) and six palace halls (1959). The Amber Room was restored only by 2003. The town was rebuilt in 1950-1960s. Several factories were established in the eastern part of Pushkin and in Sofia and two prominent monuments were raised in 1960, to Vladimir Lenin (sculptor Zair Azgur) and Ernst Thälmann (sculptor Arnold). In 1975, the town was equipped with a new water system and modern sewage treatment facilities, which were upgraded in 1999–2005 within a joint Russian-Finnish-Swedish project.

=== Post-Soviet period ===
Since the early 1990s Pushkin became a luxury housing development area. Notable festivals are conducted every year on the weekend after the City Day (24 June). International carnivals are conducted in the town from 1995 and from 2000 Pushkin is a member of the Federation of European Carnival Cities. Large scale cleanup and reconstruction of the town was conducted before the celebration of the 300th anniversary of the town (24 June 2010). In April 2004 vandals pushed the monument of Lenin from its pedestal breaking the statue. The reconstruction of the Catherine Cathedral began on the place of the monument on 7 December 2006. Another monument of Lenin was heavily damaged on 6 December 2010 in an explosion staged by an unknown group.

=== Coat of arms ===
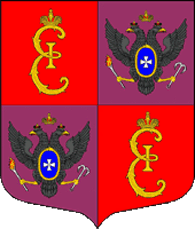
Coat of arms of Pushkin (Tsarskoye Selo)

The coat of arms of Tsarskoye Selo was adopted on 12 March 1831 as a crowned monogram of Catherine I. It was however not the emblem of the city, but only of the imperial residence. Two town emblems were proposed by Baron Bernhard Karl von Koehne, one in 1859 and another in 1882, but neither was accepted.

In Soviet times the town had no coat of arms. In 1990, the coat of arms of 1831 was registered as the emblem of Museum "Tsarskoye Selo" and for this reason could not be approved as a symbol of the city. The Decree of Pushkin City Council of 15 March 2001 approved the following coat of arms. It featured an oval shield with the monogram of Catherine I on red background. The shield was topped with a golden crown and had golden laurel branches underneath. On 25 March 2010, Pushkin Municipal Council approved the current four-panel coat of arms. Two of its panels feature identical crowned monograms of Catherine I on red background, and the other two parts depict a black double-headed eagle of the Catherine II era on a purple background. The eagle has a red tongue, golden beaks and claws and three crowns. In its right paw the eagle holds a silver torch burning with gold flame and in the left paw it has a two-legged silver anchor without a cross bar. The eagle's breast is covered with a blue oval shield with a silver cross on it; the rim of the shield is formed by a snake biting its tail. This 4-part coat is named as "extended" or "big" (Russian: большой) whereas its one part with the Catherine I monogram is called "small" (Russian: малый) and is also an official coat of arms of Pushkin.

Population trend of Pushkin

== Geology ==
The town is located on the Neva Lowland, on the left bank of the river Neva. The landscape is quite varied and contains hills, ridges and terraces intermixed with valleys, plains, forests and farmland. Numerous springs give rise to streams and feed ponds. In the Paleozoic era, 300–400 million years ago, the area was covered by a sea. Sediments of that time form a layer thicker than 200 metres (660 feet) on top of the Baltic Shield consisting of granite, gneiss and diabase. The modern topography was shaped by the glacier retreat some 12,000 years ago which created the Littorina Sea. About 4,000 years ago the sea receded and formed the valley of the Neva River which has not changed much over the last 2,500 years.

== Geography ==
=== Climate ===
The climate in Pushkin is temperate and wet, it is transitional between oceanic and continental. The length of the day varies from 5 hours and 51 minutes in the winter solstice to 18 hours and 50 minutes in the summer solstice. Summer is short and moderately warm, whereas winter is long and uneven, with frequent thaws. Air temperatures above 0 °C (32 °F) prevail from early April to mid-November. The coldest month is February. Winds mostly blow southward and frequently change air mass above the city. Summer is dominated by westerly and northwesterly winds, and the wind direction changes to westerly and southwesterly in winter. The cloudiest months are November, December and January, and the least cloudy are May, June and July. There are at least 240 sunny days per year. Between May 25 and July 16, white nights are observed when the sun only briefly goes over the horizon and the day lasts nearly 19 hours. The area is mostly fed by surface and ground waters.

Climate data for Pushkin
Month	Jan	Feb	Mar	Apr	May	Jun	Jul	Aug	Sep	Oct	Nov	Dec	Year
Record high °C (°F)	8.6 (47.5)	10.2 (50.4)	14.9 (58.8)	25.3 (77.5)	30.9 (87.6)	34.6 (94.3)	35.3 (95.5)	33.5 (92.3)	30.4 (86.7)	21.0 (69.8)	12.3 (54.1)	10.9 (51.6)	35.3 (95.5)
Mean daily maximum °C (°F)	−2.3 (27.9)	−1.4 (29.5)	4.1 (39.4)	9.2 (48.6)	16.1 (61.0)	20.5 (68.9)	22.2 (72.0)	20.6 (69.1)	14.6 (58.3)	8.5 (47.3)	1.8 (35.2)	−0.7 (30.7)	9.4 (48.9)
Daily mean °C (°F)	−6.5 (20.3)	−6.0 (21.2)	−1.4 (29.5)	4.4 (39.9)	10.9 (51.6)	15.8 (60.4)	17.7 (63.9)	16.4 (61.5)	11.0 (51.8)	5.6 (42.1)	−0.1 (31.8)	−3.9 (25.0)	5.2 (41.4)
Mean daily minimum °C (°F)	−7.9 (17.8)	−7.7 (18.1)	−2.9 (26.8)	1.6 (34.9)	7.1 (44.8)	11.9 (53.4)	14.0 (57.2)	13.0 (55.4)	8.0 (46.4)	3.7 (38.7)	−2.1 (28.2)	−5.5 (22.1)	2.8 (37.0)
Record low °C (°F)	−35.9 (−32.6)	−35.2 (−31.4)	−29.9 (−21.8)	−21.8 (−7.2)	−6.6 (20.1)	0.1 (32.2)	4.9 (40.8)	1.3 (34.3)	−3.1 (26.4)	−12.9 (8.8)	−22.2 (−8.0)	−34.4 (−29.9)	−35.9 (−32.6)
Average precipitation mm (inches)	40 (1.6)	31 (1.2)	35 (1.4)	33 (1.3)	38 (1.5)	64 (2.5)	78 (3.1)	77 (3.0)	67 (2.6)	65 (2.6)	56 (2.2)	49 (1.9)	633 (24.9)

== Soil, vegetation and wildlife ==
Prior to the founding of the town the area was covered by temperate coniferous forests (mostly pine and fir) with an admixture of broad-leaved trees and fens. The soils were mostly podzol, combined with peat and gleysols. Intensive economic activities changed the original forest landscape to agricultural land with small groves of aspen, birch, alder and willow. In the 18–19th centuries, a large park area of 704 hectares has been created in and around the city. Owing to the parks and environment-friendly policies, the Pushkin area has relatively low level of pollution. There is a large number of birds, reptiles and invertebrates; also common are hare and muskrat.

Moscow gate	Gostiny Dvor	Sadovaya Street	Church of St. Sergius

== Population ==
Working-age population makes 63% of the total, 13% are younger and 24% are older than the working age. The number of children born in 2008 was 1278; this is 137 more than in 2007, yet this about half of the value required for population replacement; 285 children were born by unmarried mothers. 1471 marriage and 742 divorce acts were registered in 2009. The fraction of women in the total population is 54%, and the difference is especially large (2700 women per 1000 men) for citizen outside of working age. The average age of residents is 40 years and is increasing. During 11 months of 2009, 19,316 foreign nationals were registered in Pushkin, that is 3,500 more than in 2008.

Population of Pushkin
Year	1817	1897	1910	1926	1939	1959	1970	1979	1989	1991	1996	2002	2007	2010
Population	4,000	22,400	30,880	19,300	56,000	46,000	70,000	90,000	95,415	95,300	93,600	84,628	96,000	92,889

== Local government ==
The Pushkin Municipal Council consists of twenty deputies who are elected in municipal elections in four multi-member electoral districts formed on the territory of the municipality, with the number of deputy mandates to be distributed in one district equal to five. As a result of the elections on 14 September 2014, the 5th convocation was elected. All 20 deputies are from United Russia (four resigned). In 2019, 18 deputies were elected to the VI convocation, of which 10 deputies were nominated by United Russia, four by the Communist Party of the Russian Federation, two by Yabloko, one by A Just Russia – For Truth, and one self-nominated candidate.

== Layout and architecture of the town ==
The modern layout of Pushkin was developed in the early 20th century, it consists of two main parts. The northeastern part (old Tsarskoye Selo) contains the oldest streets of the city, such as Sadovaya, Srednyaya and Malaya, and has the Cathedral Square in its center. At the request of Alexander I this part was surrounded by the Catherine and Alexander parks from the south and west and by the October and Sofia boulevards from the east and north. Yet, this part of the town has been constantly expanding, to the east up to the railroad and to the north up to Detskoselskiy boulevard. The southern part of the town is the former town of Sofia, planned by Catherine II and centered at the Sofia Square. To the north, east and west of this part lie the Catherine, Babolovo and Otdelny parks. The railroad to Pavlovsk and Vitebsk runs through the eastern border of the city.

The major attractions of the town are described below.

=== State Museum-Reserve "Tsarskoye Selo" ===
This palace and park ensemble of 18th–19th centuries served as the royal residence and was converted into a museum after the nationalization in March 1918. It received its current status of museum-reserve in 1992. Restoration of the museum is partly supported by the World Bank; about US$4 million has been spent by 2008 and some US$3.2 million more is required to complete the restoration. The museum-reserve includes:

==== Catherine Park ====
The park is named in honor of the Empress Catherine I of Russia. It occupies an area of 107 hectares and consists of the regular Old Garden (1717–1720) and an English garden (1760–1796, architect Vasily Neyelov) separated by large ponds. The park includes numerous pavilions of significant architectural and historical value. Most of them have been restored.

Catherine Park
Catherine Palace	Pavilion Hermitage	Cameron's Gallery	Admiralty

==== Catherine Palace ====
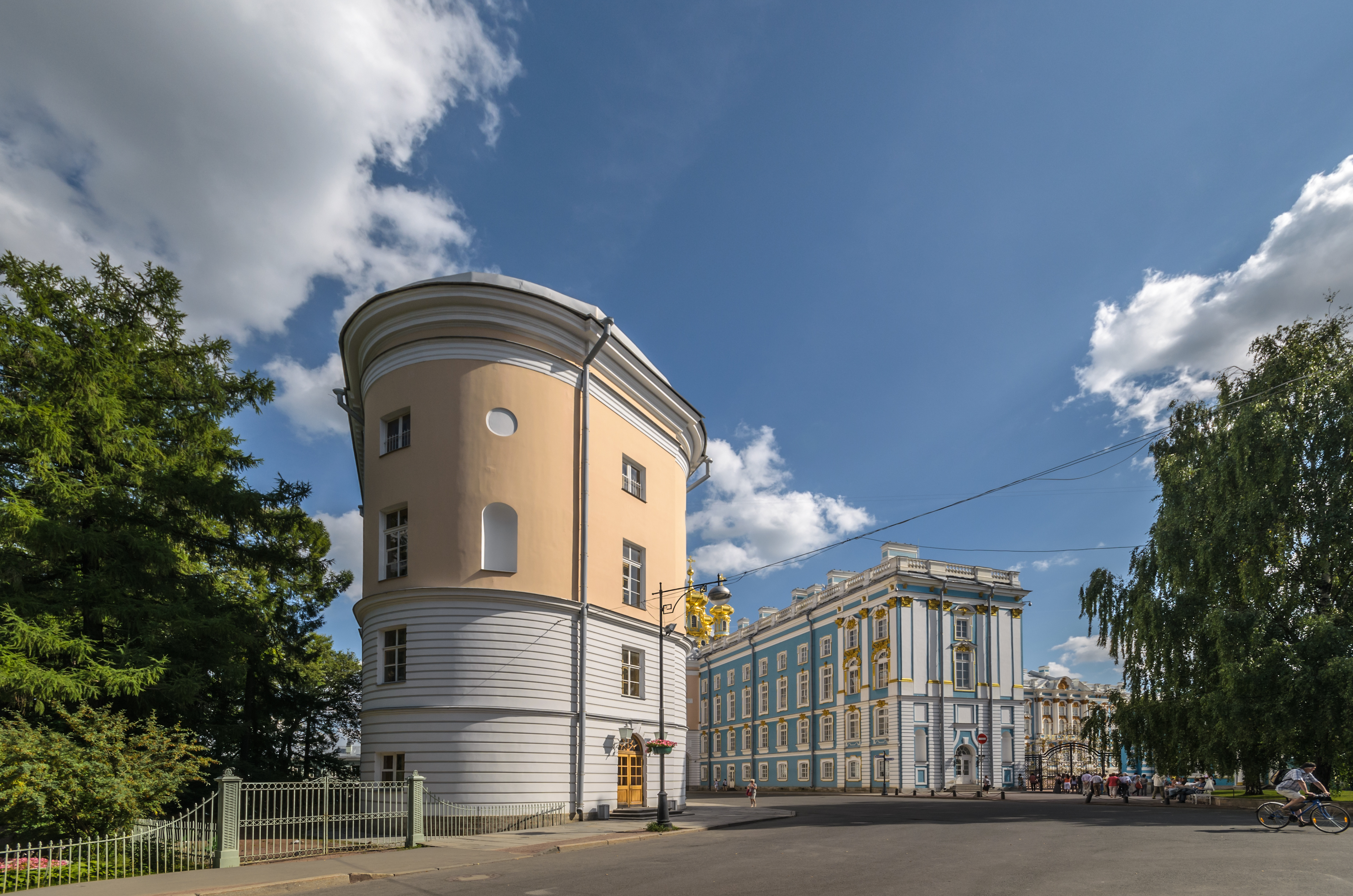
Lyceum

The original palace of 1717–1723 was rebuilt in 1743–1756, first by Mikhail Zemtsov, A. V. Kvasov and Savva Chevakinsky and then by Francesco Bartolomeo Rastrelli. Rastrelli was the primary author of the architectural design and lush sculptural decoration of the façade, in the style of Russian Baroque; he also designed the interior layout and decoration. The main courtyard is facing west and has a gilded wrought-iron fence and gates. The palace is surrounded by a few buildings added in the late 18th century. One of them is a four-story outhouse to the south, which hosted the Tsarskoye Selo Lyceum and was then converted into a museum, a branch of the All Russian Pushkin Museum. Lyceum is connected with the palace by an arch over Sadovaya Street (architect I. Neelov). Other attachments to the palace include Zubovsky wing on the southern side (architect Y. M. Felton) and Cameron's Gallery, cold saunas and a hanging garden to the southeast. One of the most famous rooms of the palace is the Amber Room.

==== Alexander Park ====
The park occupies an area of 120 hectares next to the main entrance. It consists of a regular part (the New Garden, 1740s, N. Girard) and the Landscape Park (1790s) with three ponds and artificial mounds. River Kuzminka, partitioned by a dam, flows in the western part of the park. Unfortunately, most monuments in the park are in a deteriorating condition.

Alexander Park
Alexander Park	Chinese Village	Pavilion Arsenal	Pavilion "White Tower"

==== Alexander Palace ====
This classical palace was built in 1792–1796 by Giacomo Quarenghi for Alexander I. The palace is an elongated two-storey building with double wings on either side and a two-row colonnade on the northern side. Next to the palace is a vast park with a lake.

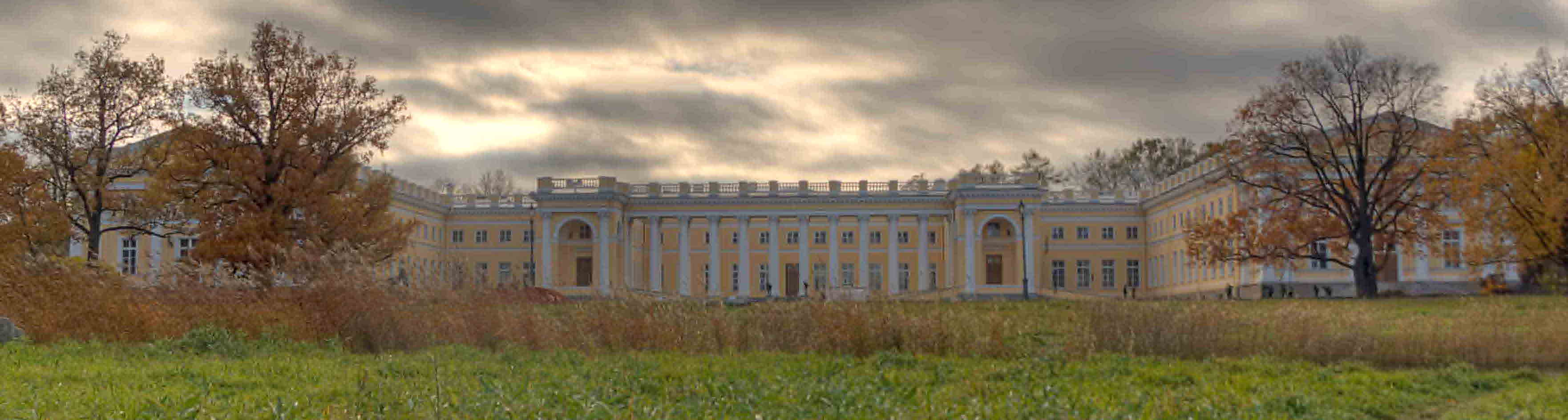
Panoramic view of Alexander Palace in 2010

=== Other points of interest ===
- The Tsars originally had their railway station served by their own railway line that branched off the main St.Petersburg Vitebsk Station to Tsarskoye Selo main line south of Shushary station. A number of incomplete bridge structures survive from this railway. The Emperor railway station in Pushkin town, which served by the Alexander and Catherine Palaces survives in derelict condition to the North of Alexandra Park Akademicheski Prospect.
- The Tsar Nicholas II Car Garages, which are now owned by an Agricultural University. The complex of three buildings is located to the North of Alexandra Park on Akademicheski Prospect. Located in Akademicheskiy Prospect. Adolphe Kegresse inventor of the Kegresse track half-track and Dual-clutch transmission worked here as the Head of the Mechanical Department of the Garage.In 1908, the architect Lipsky VA designed a second two-storeyed Art Nouveau building for the Russian Imperial garage at Tsaskoye Selo / Pushkin, Saint Petersburg it had a total area of 367.6 sq. M. It housed the garage-residence Adolphe Kegresse. The building is noteworthy and identifiable for inclusion of a grand staircase with an external bas-relief image of one of the first car races that were held regularly in Tsarskoe Selo before the First World War.
- Pavel Chistyakov's home located in Moskovskoye Shosse, which is now a museum. Pavel Chistyakov was a realistic painter and teacher of Ilya Repin
- Olenins' House, built in 1828 at 1/17 Pushkinskaya Street.
- Kitaev's House, built in 1827.
- The Cavalry Houses built 1752-1753 Nos. 4, 6, 10, 12 Sadovaya Street.
- Court Riding Arena built in 1786, and rebuilt in 1819 at 16 Sadovaya Street.
- Residential House of Police Officers built 1889-1901 at 32/24 Pushkinskaya Street.
- Babolovo Park was established in the late 18th century and expanded to an area of 268.8 ha in 1820-1860s. It is connected by a straight lane with the Catherine Park. In 1783–1786, Babolovo Palace was built in the park by the architect V. I. Neelov for the prince Grigory Potemkin. It was rebuilt in 1824–1825 by Vasily Stasov and is known for a large granite bath. The palace is ruined at present. Taitsky conduit built in 1772–1787 runs through the park. Until 1905, this was the only water pipeline of Tsarskoye Selo.
- Otdelny Park has an area of 100 hectares. It starts on the left side of the Sofia Boulevard and extends to Pavlovsk. The park contains Kolonistsky pond created in 1824–1825 for draining the surrounding countryside.
- Fermsky Park is located near the Fedorovskiy town and Alexander Park. It was arranged by Adam Menelaws in 1818–1820 as a grazing area at the nearby imperial farm. A pond was dug in the park for watering.
- Buffer Park has been established in the late 1980 – early 1990s. It is situated at the entrance to Pushkin through the Pulkovo highway. The park contains five ponds and is adjacent to Kuzminskoye Cemetery. Tsarskoselskaya Railway was passing through the park and its remains are still visible.
- Reserve Palace was built in 1817–1824 on Sadovaya street in a classical style reminiscent of an Italian Renaissance villa by the architects Adam Menelaws and Vasily Stasov.
- Gostiny Dvor (1866, architect N. Nikitin) is a set of interconnected premises with large halls meant for commercial activities.
- Palace of Princess Olga Paley (1911–1912, architect K. Schmidt) is three-story building in classical style, is now home to the Military Engineering-Technical University.
- Mansion of Viktor Kochubey (1911–1913, architect A. I. Taman, Radishcheva street 4). Nowadays it houses the sanatorium "Tsarskoye Selo".
- Detskoye Selo Station building (1946–1950, architect E. A. Levinson) consists of a two-storey body and three pavilions. The project was awarded Stalin Prize in 1951.
- Vuyich's House, originally the garden of a house belonging to Ludwig-Wilhelm Tepper de Ferguson

Reserve Palace	Gostiny Dvor; Postcard. 1904	Palace of Princess Olga Paley	Memorial Museum of A. Pushkin	Emperor railway station in Pushkin town

Tsar Nicholas II Car Garages	Racing Car Mural Tsar Nicholas II Car Garages	Kegresse track 1914–18 at Tsar Nicholas II Car Garages	Kegresse track 1914–18 at Tsar Nicholas II Car Garages	Pavel Chistyakov's Studio in his home which is now a museum

== Economy ==
As of January 1, 2010, there were 741 companies in Pushkin, including 165 in foodservice, 358 in trade and 53 in small retail sales, 162 in household services, as well as 8 supermarkets and one market. There are also large retail chains in the town.

Mechanical engineering is the core industry of Pushkin. It is represented by such enterprises as plant "Sophia" (railway equipment), Pushkin's Engineering Works (road construction equipment), NGOs STIGMASH (boiler equipment), plant "Astra" and "DVT" (woodworking machinery). Several companies produce medical equipment. The town has an asphalt plant, a stone processing plant Medved' ("Bear"), and several woodworking and furniture production factories. The town has well-developed food industry which produced prefabricated frozen meat ("Daria"), beer (Tinkoff brewery is part of Anheuser-Busch InBev – the biggest beer producer in Russia), bread ("Tsarskoselsky bread"), among other products. The factory "СЛАВЯНСКИЙ" is one of the largest Russian producers of frame-panel houses.

The Sofia area of Pushkin hosts a military garrison with several aircraft and artillery units and the military cooks school No. 228. Outside the town there is military airfield and an aircraft repair plant, which is part of Forces of central subordination of the Russian Air Force.

== Transportation ==
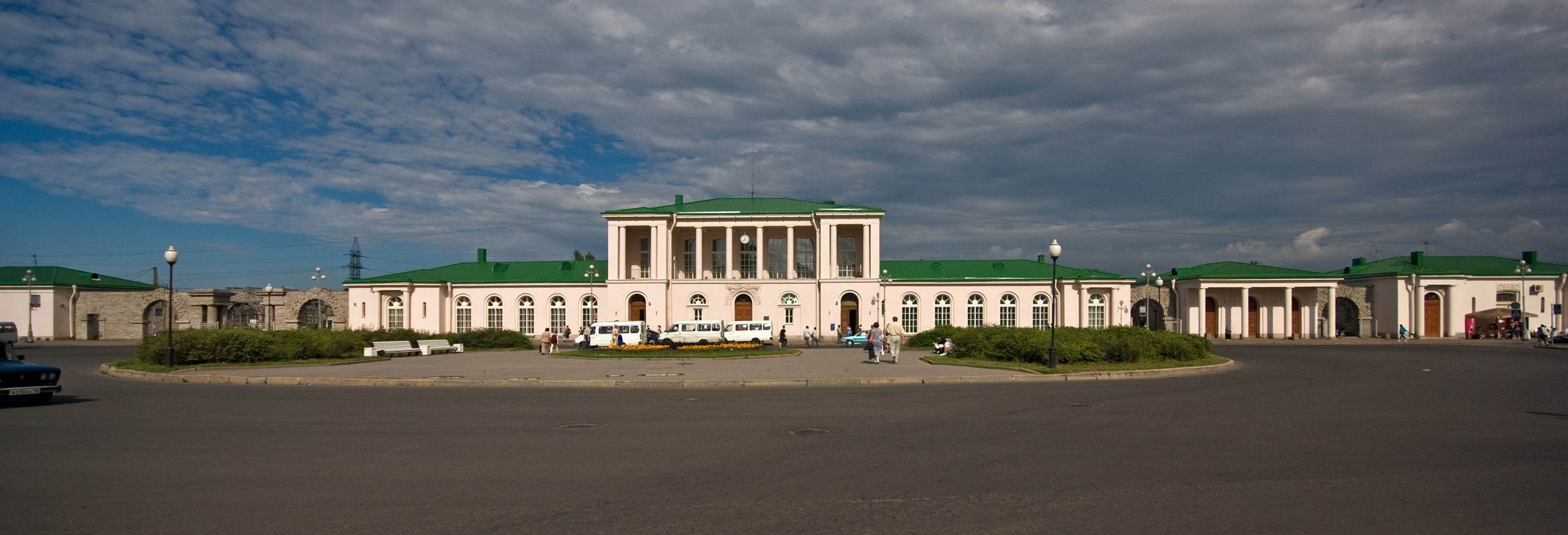
Railway station Tsarskoye Selo

Pushkin region has a well-developed system of commuter trains and buses, with 24 municipal and 17 commercial bus routes. A major railway line St. Petersburg – Vitebsk passes through the city. Saint Petersburg Ring Road and three major international highways run near Pushkin, namely M10 E105, M20 E95 and M11 E20. Pushkin is connected with St. Petersburg via Pulkovo, Moscow and Vitebsk highways.

== Culture ==
=== Museums ===
- Pushkin Museum is located in the one-story historical wooden house (1827, Pushkinskaya Street, 2/19). Here Pushkin spent the summer of 1831 with his wife Natalia. The exhibition contains his office and describes work of the poet at that time.59°43′26.6″N 30°24′00.0″E
- Historical museum of the town (1977) features about 30,000 exhibits related to the history of Tsarskoye Selo and its inhabitants.59°43′16.1″N 30°24′18.2″E
- Museum of the painter Pavel Chistyakov is valued not only by its exhibition, but also by its location in a historical Russian wooden house.59°42′47.2″N 30°25′34.3″E
- Museum "Tsarskoselskaya Collection" (1909) exhibits modern and traditional artworks created by leading masters of pictorial and plastic realism from 1910 to the present. It is housed in an Art Nouveau building with gothic elements.59°43′22.8″N 30°24′28.7″E
- Museum-exhibition "Anna Akhmatova. Tsarskoye Selo" (1999) is based on the collection of the honorary citizen A. D. Umnikov.59°43′10.3″N 30°24′13.1″E

Museum of History and Literature	Museum of Pavel Chistyakov	Museum "Tsarskoselskaya Collection"	Museum exhibition "Anna Akhmatova. Tsarskoye Selo"

=== Education and research ===
Pushkin has 14 secondary schools, 24 kindergartens and nurseries, a boarding school, a high school, gymnasium, art school, music school, several foreign languages schools, cadet school, College of Traditional Culture and the St. Petersburg Railway College. Higher education is provided by the St. Petersburg State Agrarian University, Pushkin Leningrad State University, Institute of Law and Business, Naval Engineering Institute and a Military Institute of the Mozhaysky Military Space Academy.

The town is a major center of agricultural science hosting a number of research centers and laboratories. They include the Northwestern Scientific Center of Russian Academy of Agricultural Sciences, All-Russian Scientific Research Institute of Genetics and Breeding of Farm Animals, All-Russian Research Institute of Plant Protection, All-Russian Research Institute for Agricultural Microbiology, Institute of Plant Industry, Research Institute of Chemical Soil Reclamation and many others.

=== Religion ===
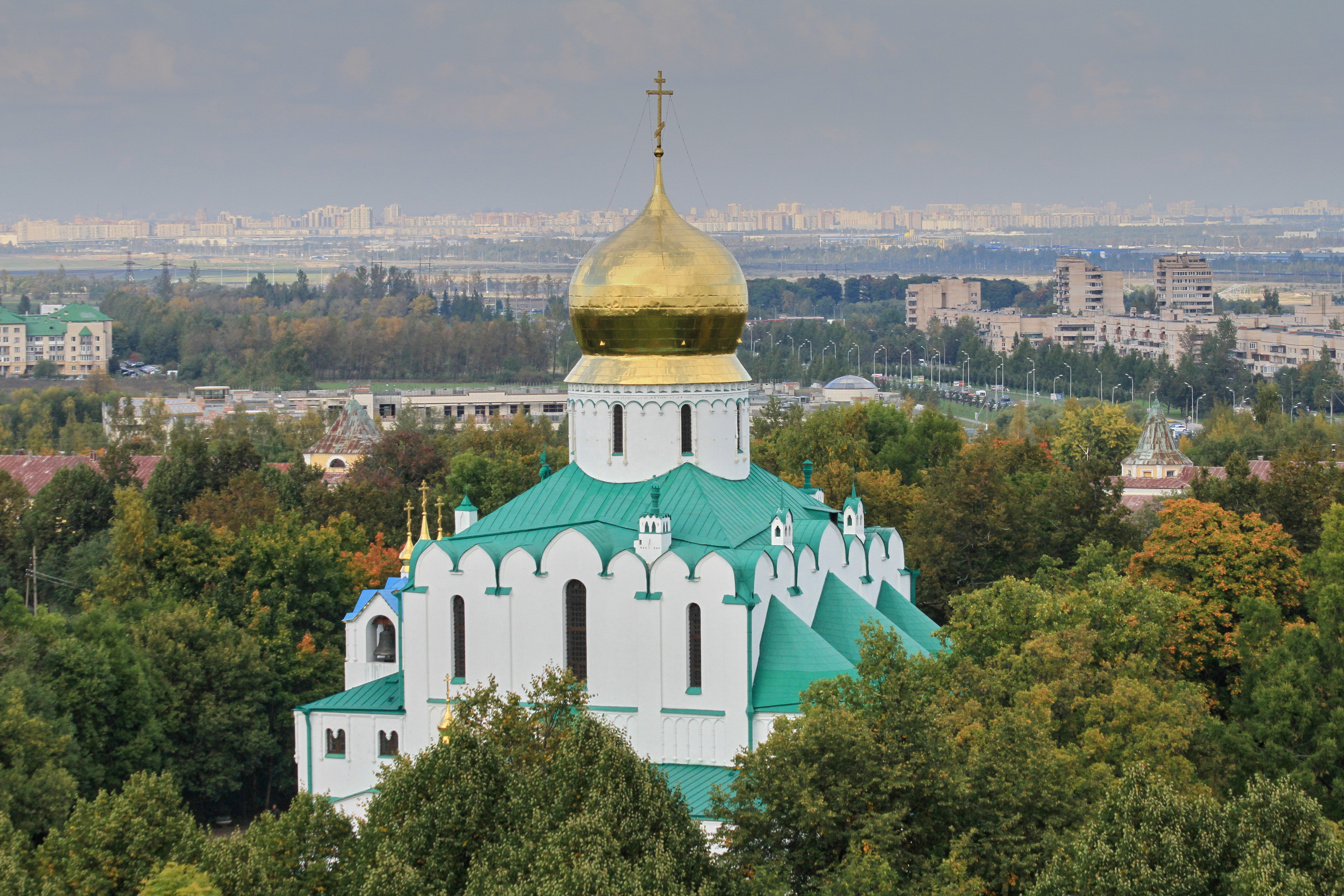
Fyodorovsky Cathedral

The town has a large number of churches and chapels. Most of them are Orthodox and are objects of cultural heritage, and only a few are listed below:

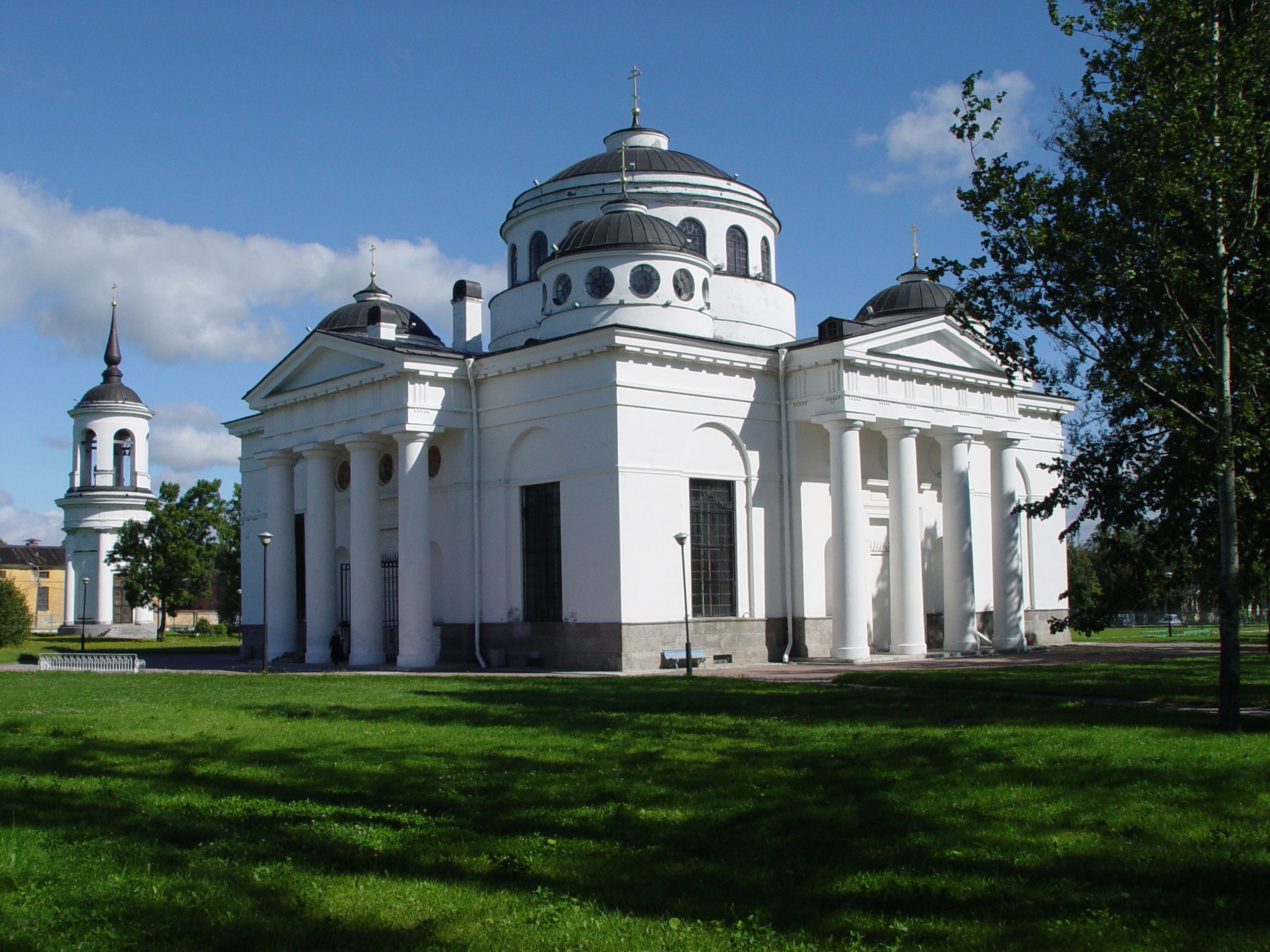
Sophia Cathedral

- Fedorovskiy Cathedral (1909–1912, architect Vladimir Pokrovsky, Academichesky Pr. 34) used to be a home church of the Imperial Family. The priests and servants of the cathedral stayed in the nearby Fedorovskiy Gorodok – a complex built in 1913-1917s in Russian Revival style.
- Znamenskaya Church (1734–1747, architect Ivan Blank) is an acting Orthodox Church and the oldest stone building in the town in the Petrine Baroque style.
- Panteleimon Church – an active church.
- Church of the Nativity of the Blessed Virgin (1870–1872, architects Ippolit Monighetti and A. F. Vidov) – an active Orthodox Church in Eclectic style.
- Sorrow Church at the former community of the Red Cross (1912–1914, architect S. A. Danini) – an active Orthodox Church in Russian Revival style.
- Catherine Cathedral (1835–1840, architect Konstantin Thon) – an Orthodox cathedral which was demolished in 1939 and restored in 2010 to the 300 anniversary of Tsarskoye Selo.
- Sophia Cathedral (1782–1788, architects Charles Cameron and I. E. Starov) – and active Orthodox cathedral in classic style.
- St. Julian's Church, Pushkin (1894–1899, architect V. N. Kuritsyn) – an Orthodox church in Russian Revival style, under restoration.
- Church of St. Sergius (1903–1904, architect A. Uspensky, Fodder lane 4) – an Orthodox Church.

The town has several churches of other denominations. Their construction is due to the fact that the town was the imperial residence, which always hosted non-Orthodox believers. Currently active are the Church of St. John the Baptist (Roman Catholic cathedral in the classical style) and an Evangelical Lutheran Church built in Gothic Revival style. The Church of Evangelical Christian Baptists is being restored. In addition, there is a Stake of the Church of Jesus Christ of Latter-day Saints (LDS Church). There are two cemeteries: Kazan (area 28.83 hectares) and Kuzminskoye (4.6 hectares).

== Sports ==
From 1947 to 2010, the town has raised 3 Honored Master of Sports, 19 International Masters of Sports and 62 Masters of Sports. There is a large number of clubs for all major sports, two swimming pools, and a town stadium for 1,500 spectators. The stadium holds track and field athletics competitions and hosts the local football club "Tsarskoye Selo" founded in 2009.

== Media ==
Pushkin has cable television which is also used, from 1991, for broadcasting the local radio station "Tsarskoye Selo". The local newspapers include "Tsarskoselskaya Newspaper" (published since 1906), which focuses on culture, international relations, government and district events; "Municipal Vestnik" reports the activities of the Pushkin Municipal Council; "Gorodok-info" is a small advertising and information newspaper distributed by hand; "Gazeta + TV" is weekly news advertising edition, and "Nash Pervyi" is a local advertising magazine.

== Twin towns – sister cities ==
Pushkin is twinned with:

- Aalborg, Denmark (2005)
- Bălți, Moldova (2015)
- Cambrai, France (2003)
- Kalamazoo County, MI, United States (1992)
- Mantua, Italy (2000)
- Nassau County, NY, United States (1996)
- Neukölln (Berlin), Germany (1991)
- Novopolotsk, Belarus (2003)
- Semey, Kazakhstan (1995)
- Valence, France (2017)
- Veria, Greece (2015)
- Worcester, MA, United States (1987)
- Zerbst, Germany (1994)

== Bibliography ==
- Darinsky A. V. (1982). География Ленинграда (Geography of Leningrad). Leningrad: Lenizdat.
