= 1785 in architecture =

The year 1785 in architecture involved some significant architectural events and new buildings.

== Events ==
- May 20 – The United States Land Ordinance of 1785 determines the layout of townships in the western territories.
- July 17 – A groundbreaking ceremony is held for the Pella Palace in Russia, designed by Ivan Starov; it will never be completed.

== Buildings and structures ==
=== Buildings completed ===
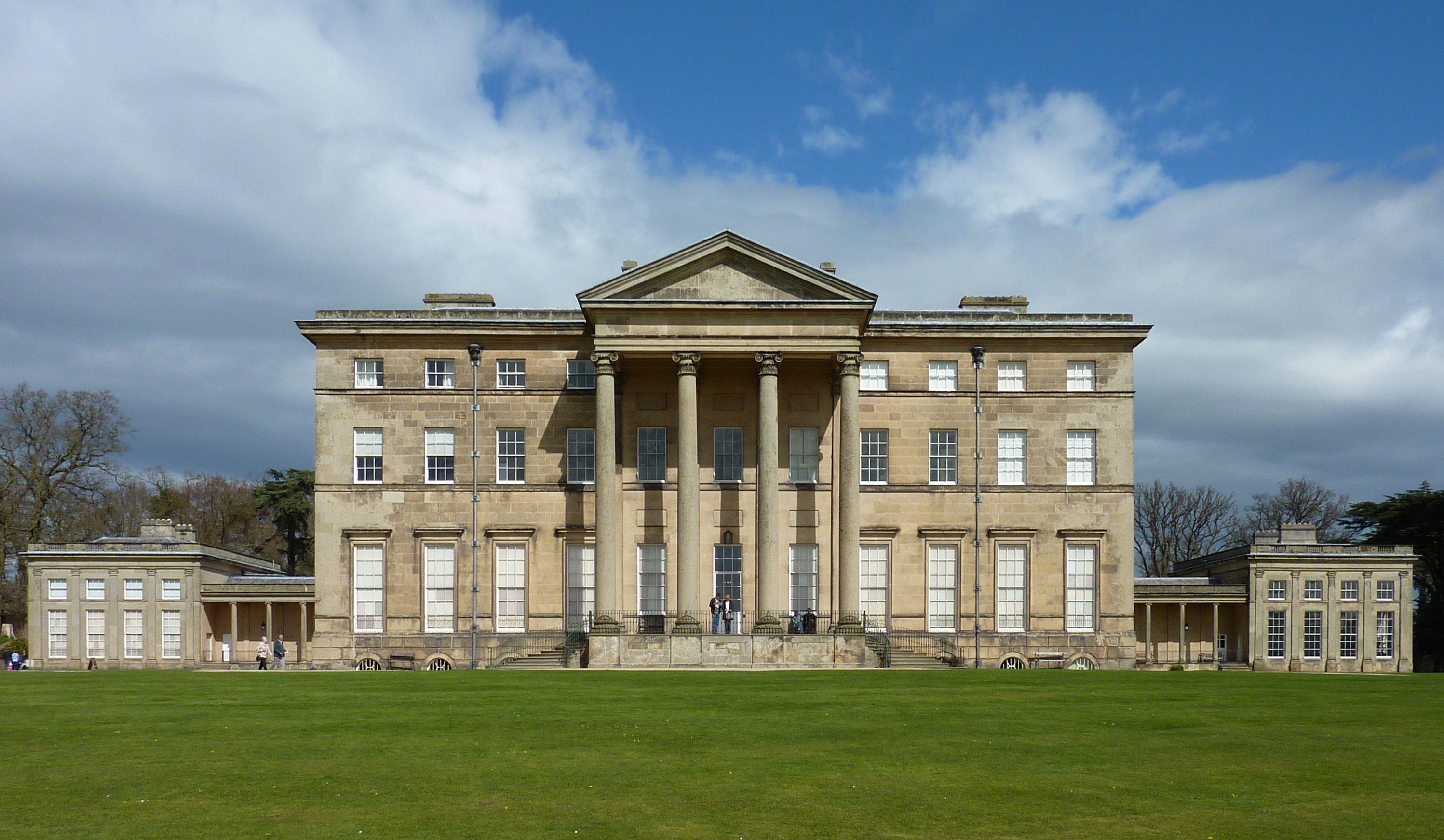
Attingham Park

- May 19 – Plaza de Toros de Ronda, Spain.
- September 7 – Notre-Dame de Guebwiller inaugurated.
- Attingham Park, Shropshire, England, designed by George Steuart.
- Chertsey Bridge over the River Thames in England, designed by James Paine and Kenton Couse.
- Marble Palace in Saint Petersburg, Russia, designed by Antonio Rinaldi.
- Church of St. Stephen Harding in Apátistvánfalva.
- Odigitrievsky Cathedral in Ulan Ude, Russia.
- Palace of Iturbide in Mexico City, designed by Francisco Antonio de Guerrero y Torres.
- Grand Palace, Bangkok, completed.
- Rebuilding of Babolovo Palace in Tsarskoe Selo, Russia, by Ilya Neyelov.
- Modifications to Neue Kirche, Berlin, by Georg Christian Unger after a design by Carl von Gontard.
- Mussenden Temple on the north coast of Ireland.

== Births ==
- October 29 – Achille Leclère, French architect (died 1853)
- William Cubitt, English civil engineer (died 1861)

== Deaths ==
- August 11 – Marie-Joseph Peyre, French architect (born 1730)
- September 26 – Ventura Rodríguez, Spanish architect and artist (born 1717)
