= Vasily Neyolov =

Vasily Ivanovich Neyolov (Russian: Василий Иванович Неёлов, 1722–1782) was a Russian architect, whose works are representative of early classicism and romanticism. He is notable as one of the first landscape park designers in Russia. Neelov served as a court architect in Tsarskoye Selo and worked with Francesco Bartolomeo Rastrelli on the construction of the Catherine Palace. Neyolov was the author of albums with plans of facades of buildings in Tsarskoye Selo (known as "Neyolov Albums"). Neyolov was one of the first architects of Russian origin working in Tsarskoye Selo.

== Biography ==
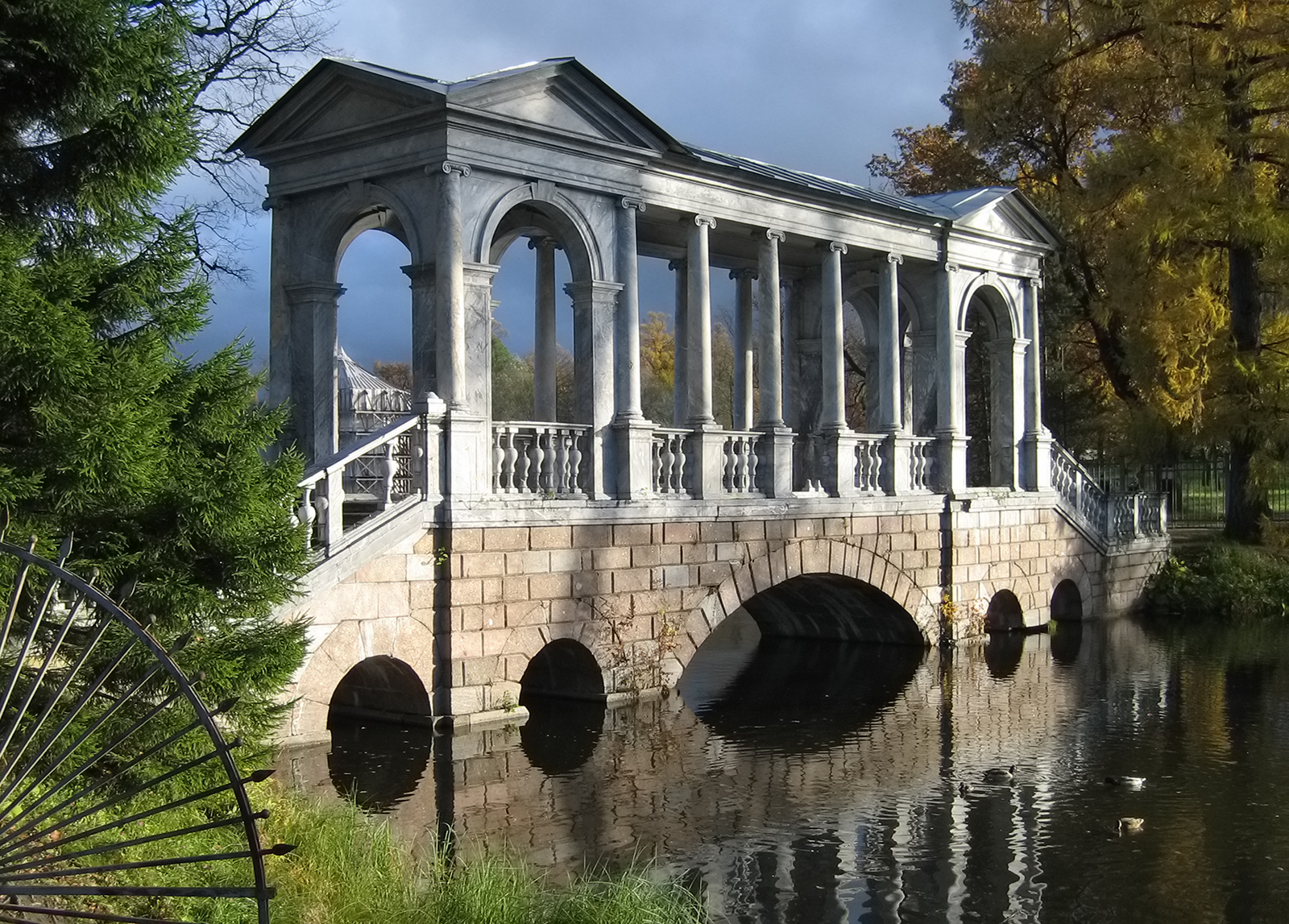
The Marble (Palladio) bridge by Vasily Neyolov in 2008

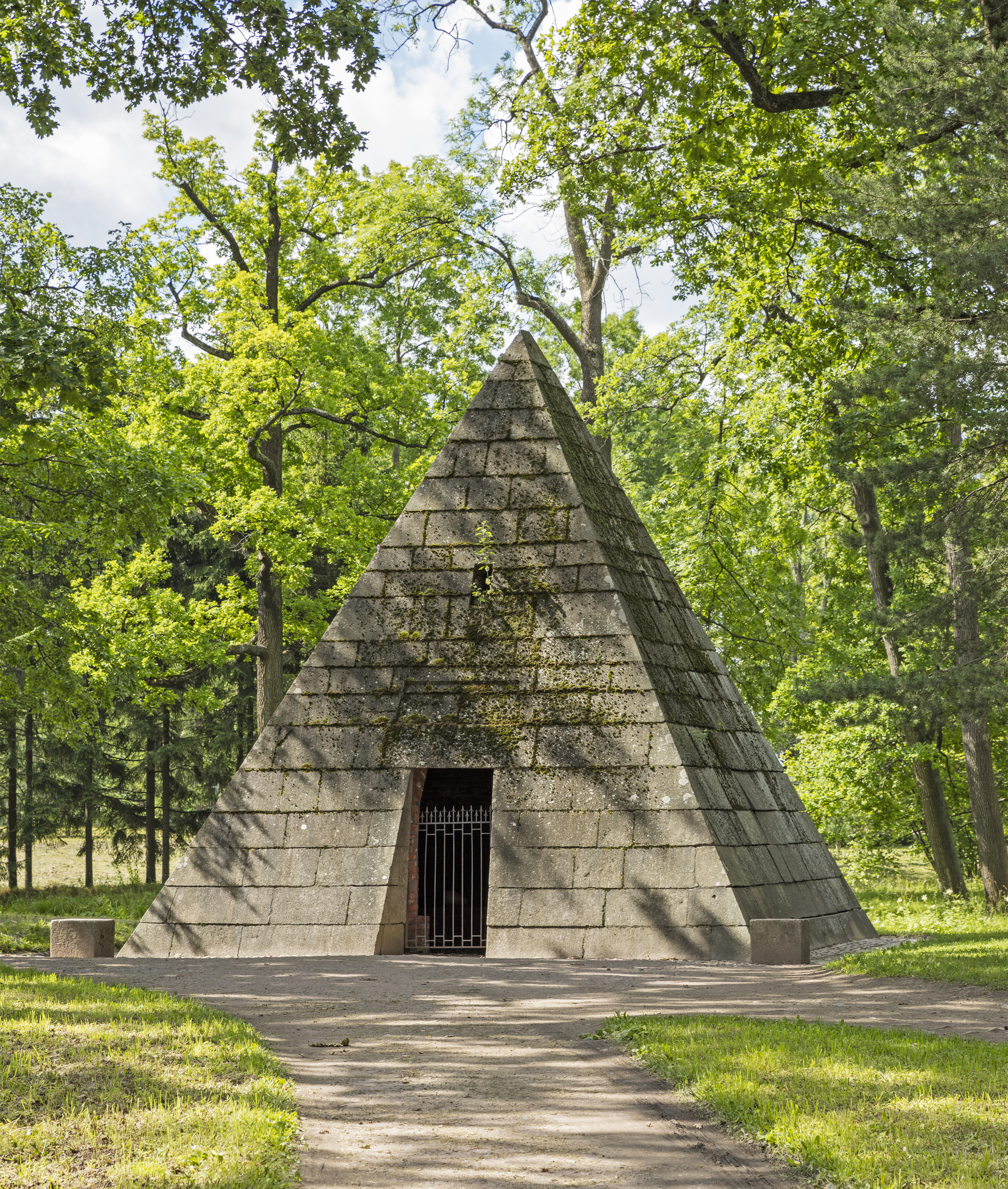
The Pyramid pavilion at Tsarskoye Selo

Neyolov was born in 1721 in the family of a sergeant. He studied architecture with Savva Chevakinsky and Mikhail Zemtsov, who worked with Francesco Bartolomeo Rastrelli since 1744. In 1748, Neyolov was appointed a deputy architect and sent to help to design the plans of the Catherine Palace and Catherine Park in Tsarskoye Selo.

In 1760 Rastrelli retired, and Neyolov became the chief architect supervising the creation of the Catherine Park. In 1770, he visited England and became strongly inspired by the English park building school. In the same year, he completed the plan of the park, which was subsequently used for the creation of the park. The role of Neyolov was not only to design bridges and pavilions, but also to choose the location of the pavilions designed by other architects, including Charles Cameron. Neyolov created the landscape part of the Catherine Park with famous romantic pavilions such as the Pyramid (1770–1771), the Admiralty and the Hermitage Kitchen (1774–1776), the "Chinese" Small and Large Whims (1770–1774, together with Johann Conrad Gerhard), the Marble (also known as Palladio, or Siberian) bridge built in the spirit of Andrea Palladio (1772–1774). To produce the Marble Bridge, Neyolov first created a wooden model of the bridge, which was sent to Yekaterinburg in order to facilitate the choice of the marble pieces. The Marble Bridge became the first classicist building in the Catherine Park.

Two of his sons, Ilya and Pyotr, helped him during the creation of this park.

Neyolov died in 1782, and was buried in the Kuzminsky cemetery in Tsarskoye Selo.
