= Catherine Park =

Park in St. Petersburg, Russia

Coordinates: 59°42′54″N 30°24′00″E

The Catherine Park (Russian: Екатерининский парк) is the large landscaped area to the south of the Catherine Palace, located in the town of Tsarskoye Selo (Pushkin), 25 km south-east of St. Petersburg, Russia.

The park has two parts: a formal 18th century Dutch-style garden and a natural English garden.

== Formal Dutch garden ==
The formal garden was laid out in 1720 by masters of Dutch landscape gardening on three parterres in front of the Imperial Palace. At the same time, a reflecting pool was constructed on the third parterre, and two ponds were made on the Vangazi creek flowing from the hill: the Upper (Large) and Mill ponds (later included in the cascade of Lower ponds).

The main features in this garden are the Upper bath, Lower bath, Hermitage, Cave, Hermitage Kitchen, Moreyskaya column, Vorota gate, and Orlov gate.

== English garden ==
The main features of the English park are: the Dutch-style boathouse the Dutch Admiralty, Hall on the Island pavilion, Chesme Column, Marble Bridge, Hammam (Islamic bathhouse), the Pyramid, Red Cascade, Gothic Gate, Ruin Tower, Orlovsky gate, Granite terrace (constructed in place of the Riding Mountain roller coaster), "Girl with a Jug" fountain, Concert Hall, Catherine Palace Kitchen Ruin, Creaky Summer House, Evening Hall, Kagul Obelisk, and Private Garden.

== Gallery ==
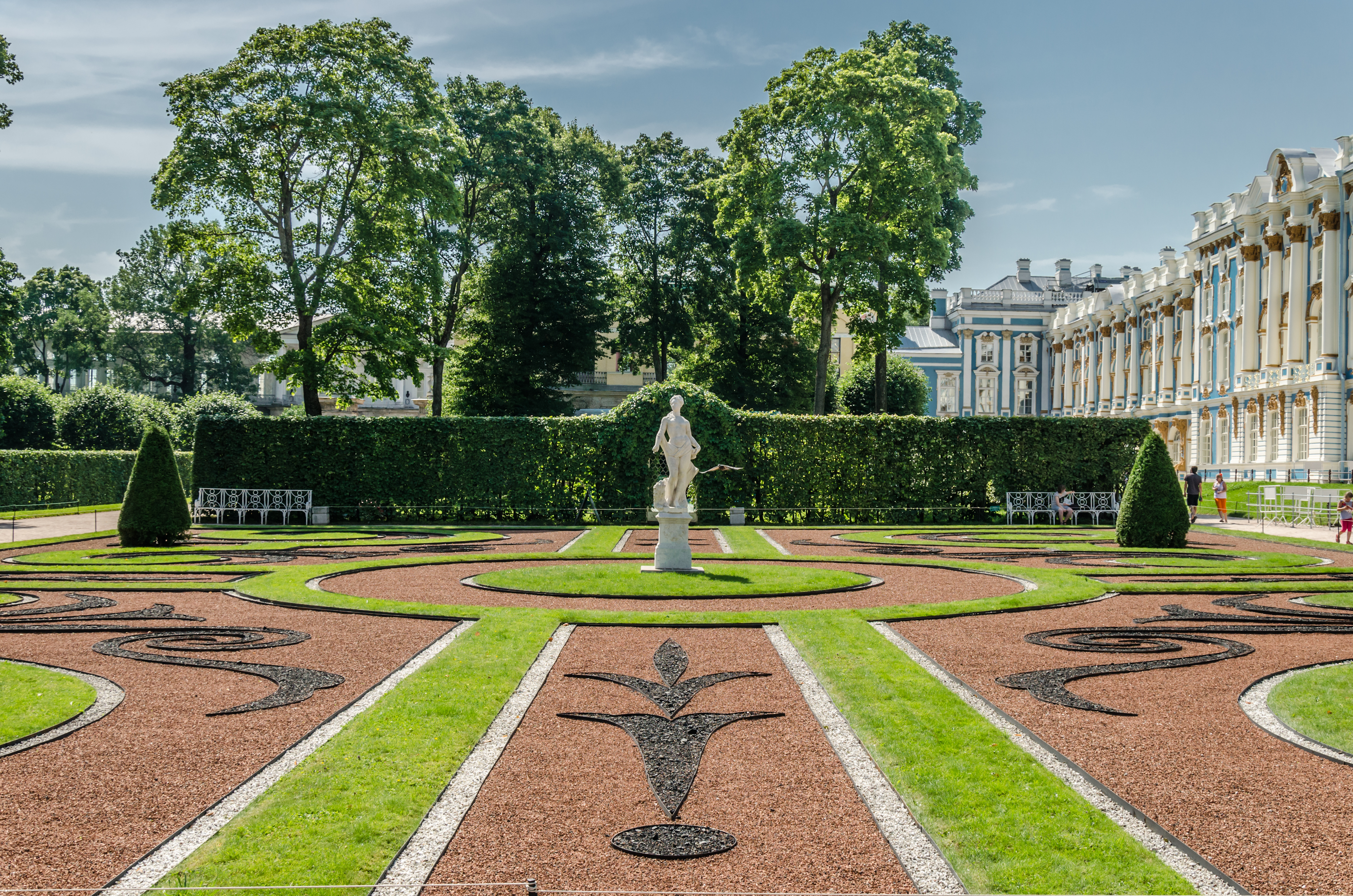

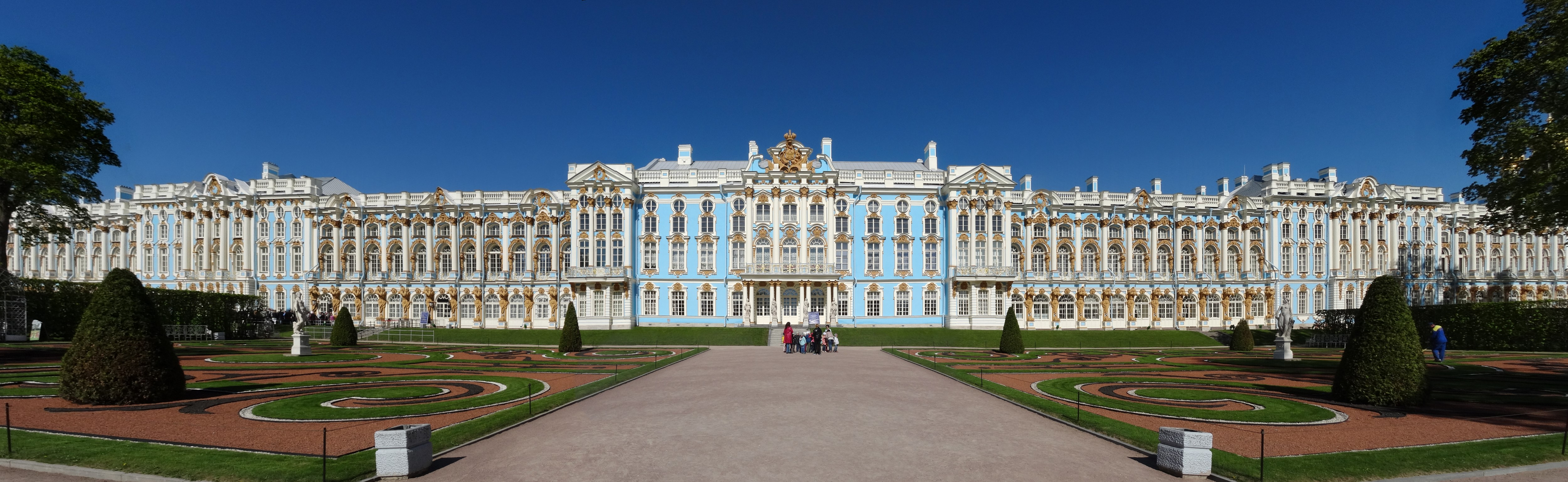
Catherine Palace

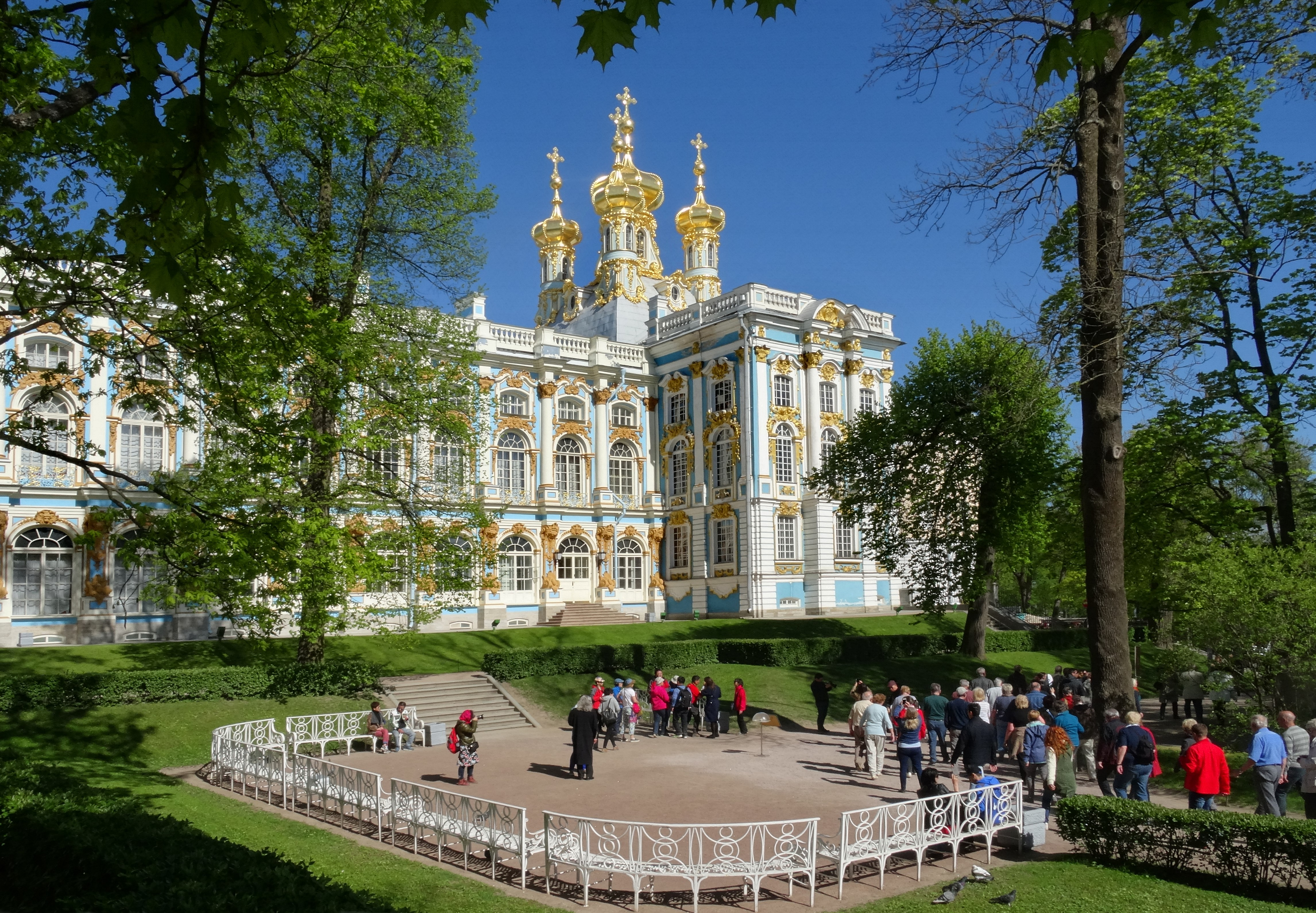
The Church of the Resurrection in the Catherine Palace.

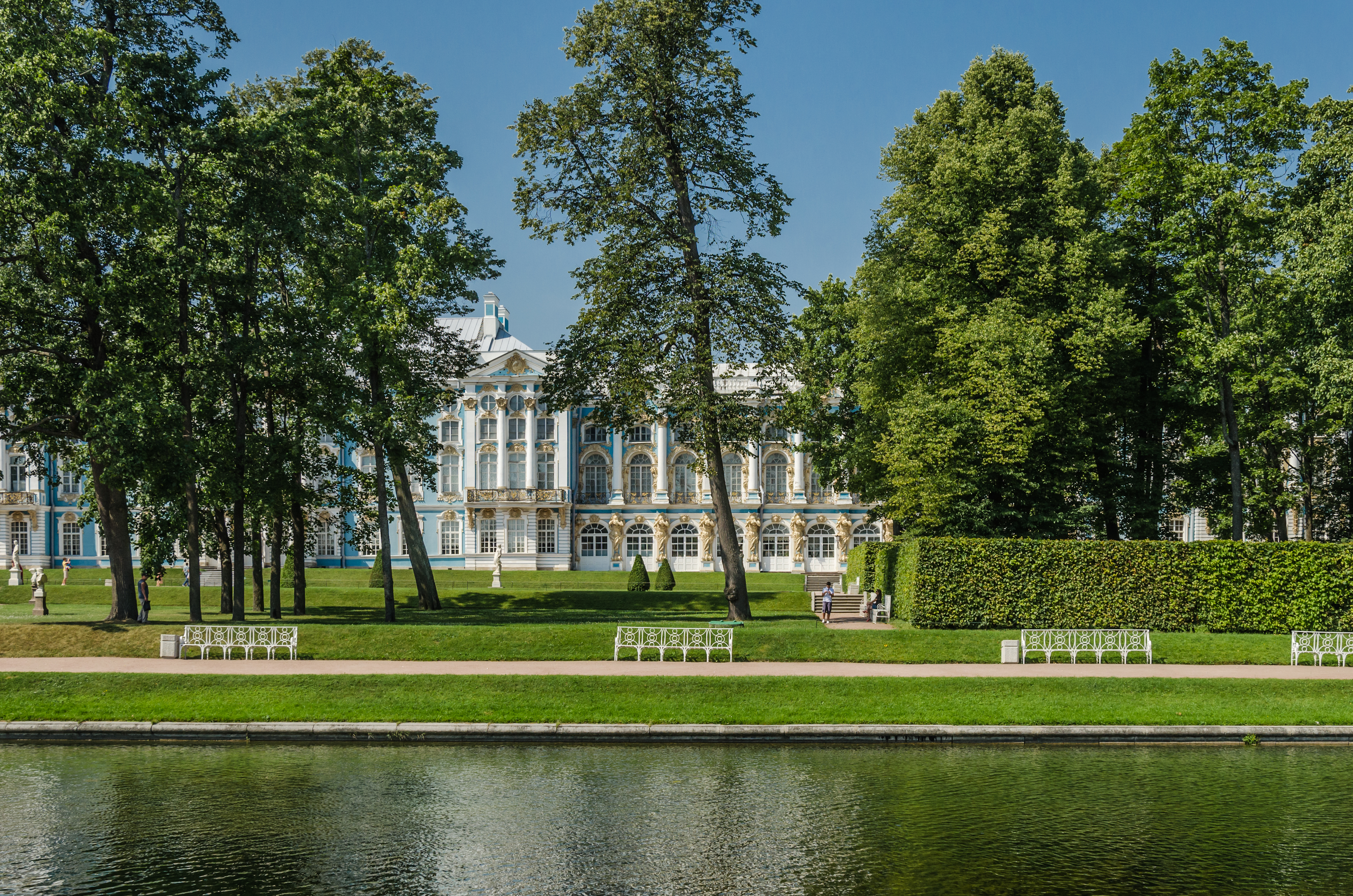

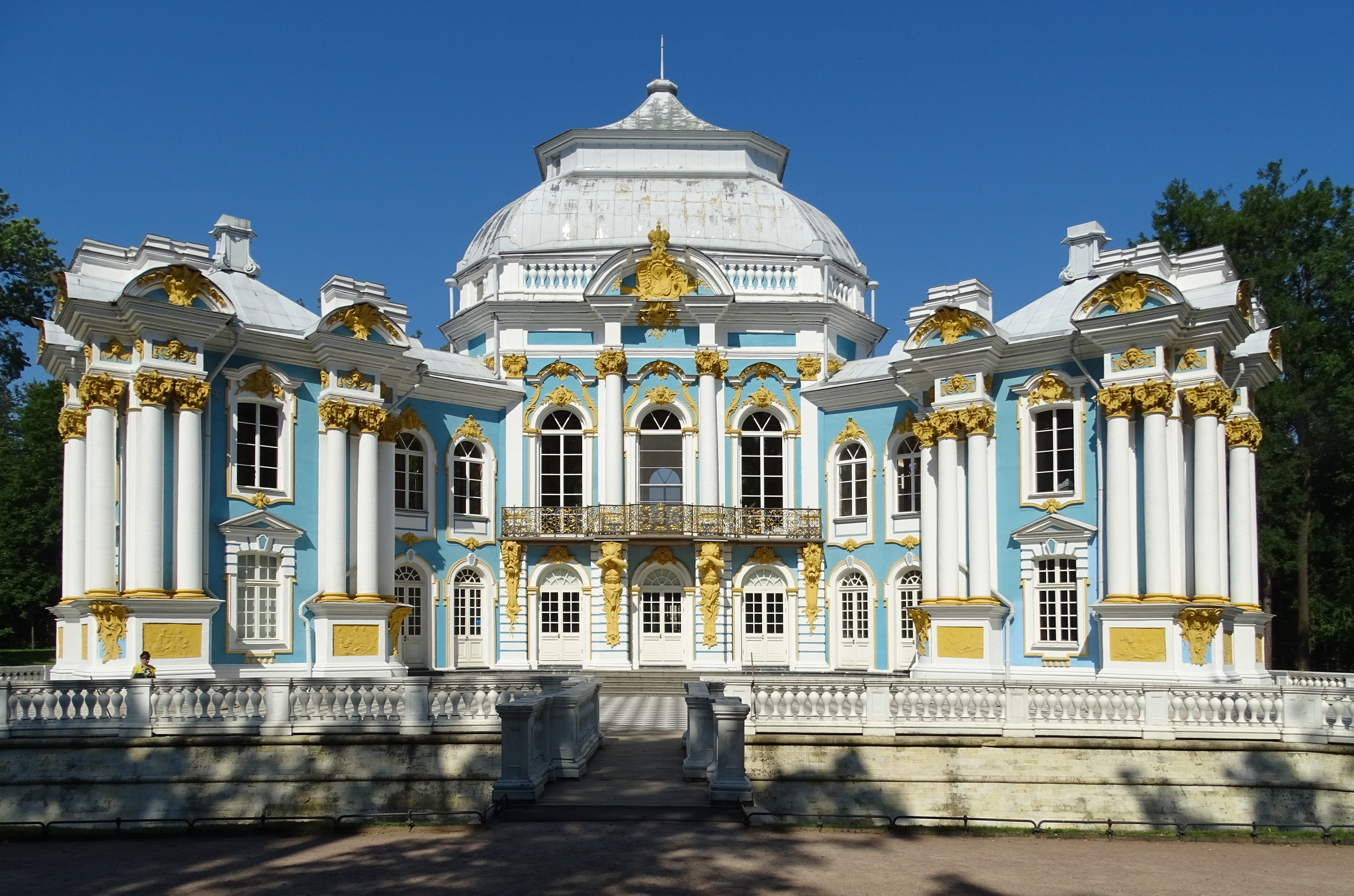
Hermitage

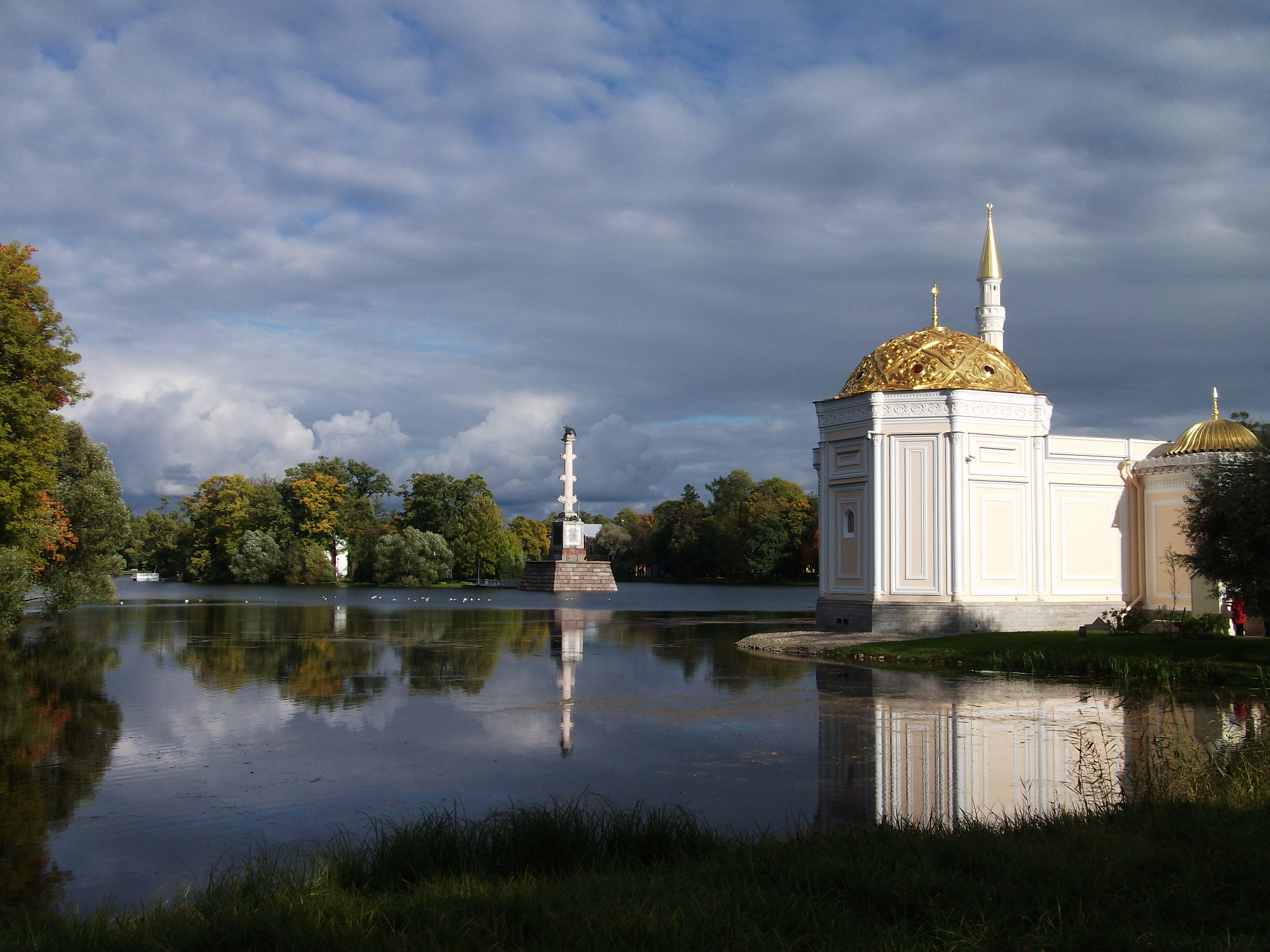
Turkish bath and Chesme Column

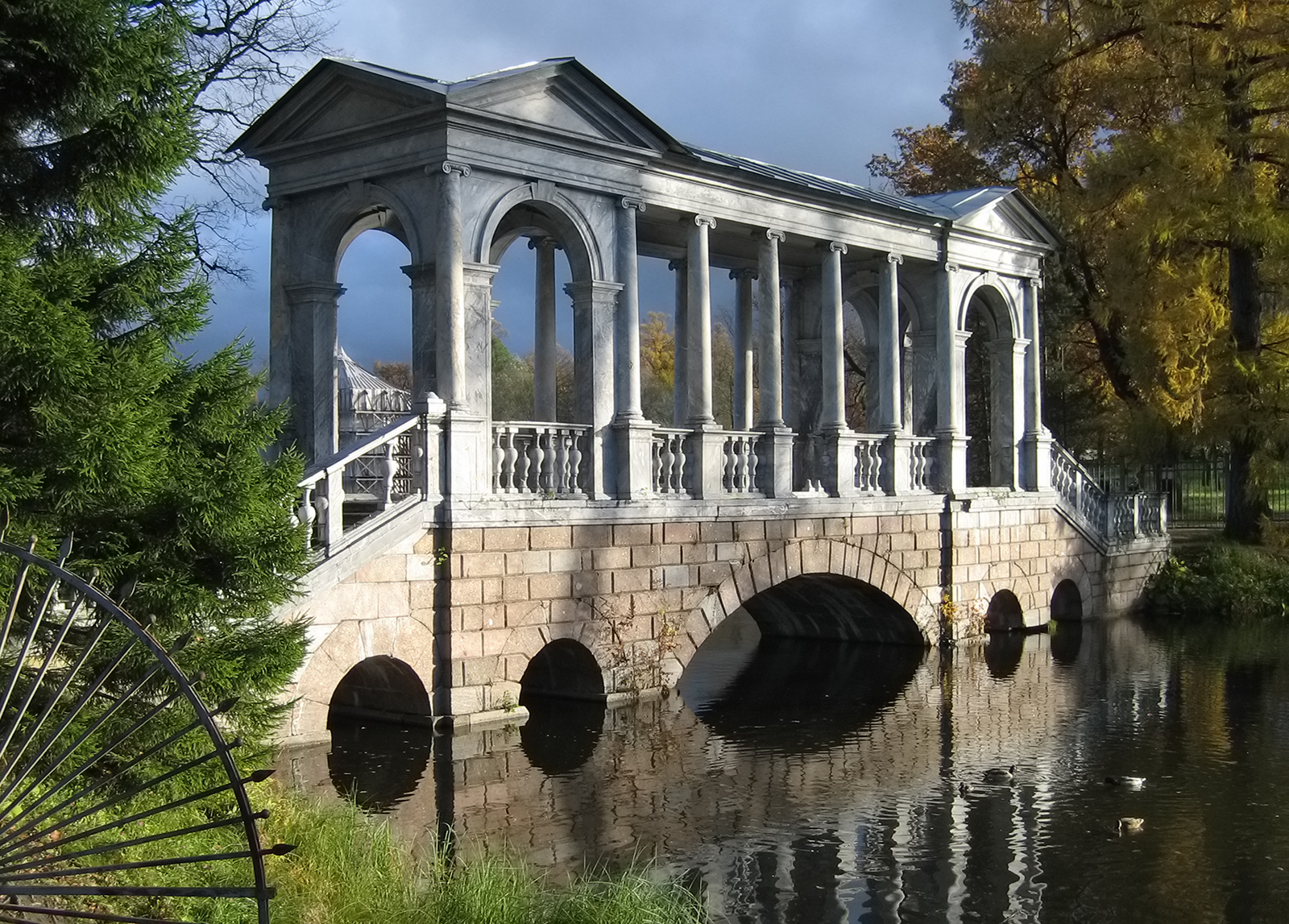
Marble Bridge

== See also ==
- The Milkmaid of Tsarskoye Selo
