= Riding Mountain (roller coaster) =

18th century roller coaster in Russia

The Riding Mountain (Russian: Катальная гора, Катальная горка, katalnaya gora, katalnaya gorka) was the name of two entertainment pavilions built in 1754–1757 in Tsarskoye Selo and in 1762–1774 in Oranienbaum royal residences of the Russian Empress Catherine the Great. They had several sliding slopes attached and in summer time they were among the earliest roller coasters. Passengers would ride cars on wheels locked in tracks. The Tsarskoye Selo pavilion was designed by Francesco Bartolomeo Rastrelli, the Oranienbaum one by Antonio Rinaldi. Both of the rides were engineered by Russian scientist Andrey Nartov.

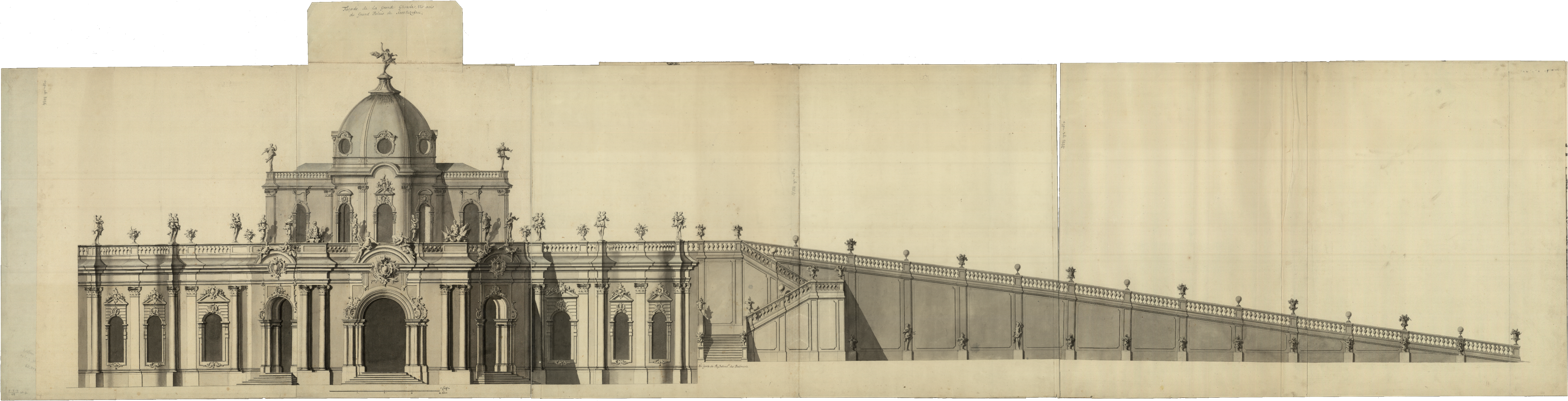
La Grande Glisade pavilion, Tsarskoye Selo. A sketch by Rastrelli

== Tsarskoye Selo ==
The "Grand Slide" (French: Grande Glisade) pavilion, as Rastrelli called it, was a huge stone building in the shape of a rotunda near the Catherine Palace. By the sides of the central eight-sided grotto of the rotunda there were gaming and dining halls. The whole building was richly decorated with antique-style sculptures and Baroque ornaments. At the second floor there were doors leading to two forses (Russian: форс), or platforms, from which one can take a ride along ramps, or artificial "mountains". Nartov designed the riding car which had copper wheels on steel axes. The wheels were to ride along two iron rails fixed to the wooden slopes.

Plan of the Catherine Park; label 21 marks the Granite Terrace built in place of the Riding Mountain pavilion

The location of Katalnaya gora was selected in 1748 or 1749 by Nartov, outside of the Old Garden above the wide slope, which had a view of the Old Garden and the Large Pond.

In 1765 the third ramp was attached, which run along the slope and to the island in the middle of the pond. It was described by the Anglican clergyman John Glen King (who mentioned that some Englishmen visiting Russia called them "Flying Mountains") as follows:

You will observe that there are five mounts of unequal height: the first and the highest is full thirty feet perpendicular altitude; the momentum with which they descend this carries them over the second, which is about five or six feet lower, just sufficient to allow for the friction and resistance; and so on to the last, from which they are conveyed by a gentle descent, with nearly same velocity, over a piece of water into a little island. These slides, which are about a furlong and a half in length, are made of wood, that may be used in summer as well as in winter. The process is, two of four persons fit in a little carriage and one stands behind, for more there are in it the greater the swiftness with which it goes; it runs on castors and in grooves to keep it on its right direction, and it descends with a wonderful rapidity. Under the hill, is a machine worked by horses for drawing the carriages back again, with the company in them. Such a work as this would have been enormous in most countries for the labour and expense in cost, as well as the vast quantity of wood used in it. At the same place, there is another artificial mount which goes in a spiral line, and in my opinion, for I have tried it also, is very disagreable; as it seems always leaning on one side, and the person feels in danger of falling out of seat.

Two other ramps by the sides of the pavilion were gentle, and their overall direction defined the direction and the name of the future wide alley known as the Ramp Alley.

Katalnaya gora was dismantled in 1792–1795. Currently in its place is the Granite Terrace in the Catherine Park, built in early 1800s.

== Oranienbaum ==
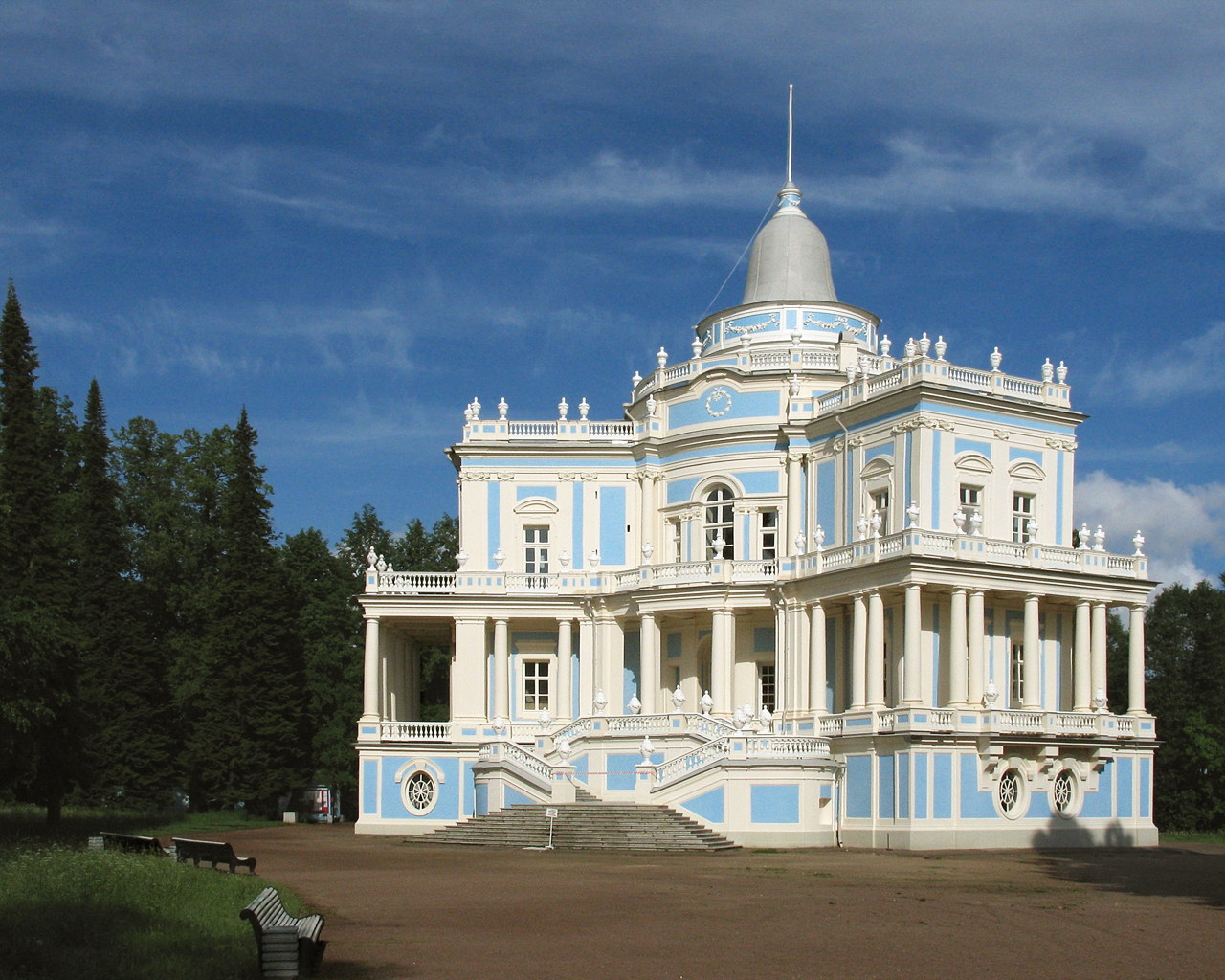
Katalnaya gora pavilion in Oranienbaum

A similar katalnaya gora pavilion was built in 1762–1774 in the Oranienbaum royal residence, architected by Antonio Rinaldi and preserved until the modern times. It had three summer-only riding ramps, also designed by Nartov. They were not preserved.

== See also ==
- The Ice House (St. Petersburg), another winter-time entertainment in Russian Empire
