= Neyolov =

Neyolov (Russian: Неёлов, sometimes Neyelov, Neelov), feminine: Neyolova is a Russian surname.

- Aleksandra Neelova (fl. 1903-1914) Russien children's writer and translator
- Alexei Vladimovich Neyelov, taxon authority
- Elena Neyolova, surname by the first marriage of Elena Bulgakova
- Marina Neyolova
- Pyotr Neyolov (1749-1846), Russian architect
- Vasily Neyolov
