= 1717 in architecture =

The year 1717 in architecture involved some significant events.

== Buildings and structures ==
=== Buildings ===
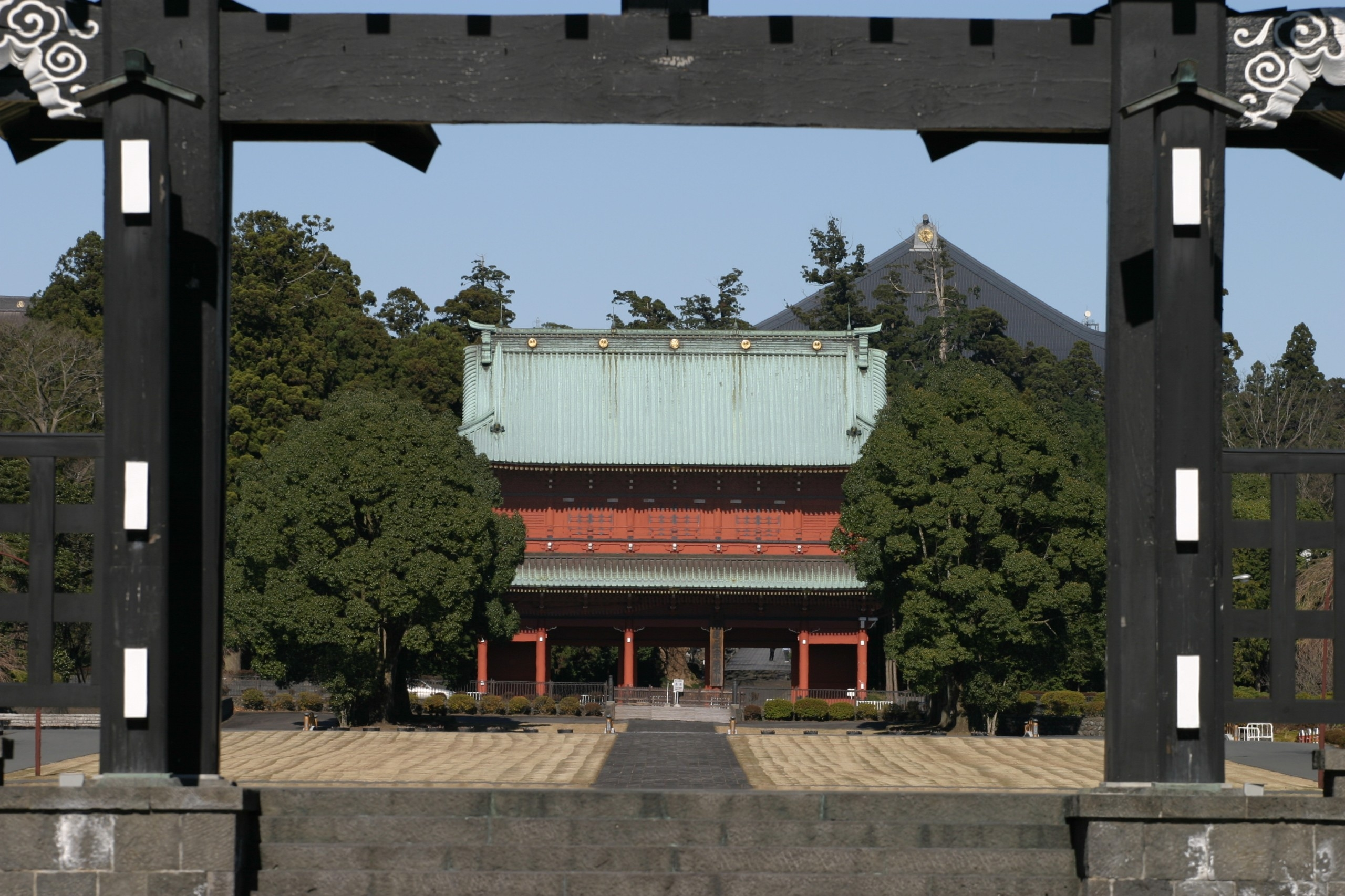
The Kuronomon and Sanmon (1717) gates of Taiseki-ji

- The Sanmon gate of Taiseki-ji temple on the lower slopes of Mount Fuji, Japan, is built with donations from Tenneiin, the wife of sixth shōgun Tokugawa Ienobu.
- Bluecoat Chambers (school) in Liverpool, England, is first completed.
- Bluecoat School, Chester, England, is built.
- Steeple of St Mary le Strand church in London, designed by James Gibbs, is completed.
- The Wayside in Concord, Massachusetts (later home of Nathaniel Hawthorne and Louisa May Alcott) is first recorded.
- Construction of the Basilica of Superga begins in the Savoyard state.
- The first stone of the Mafra National Palace is laid on the 17th of November with a grand ceremony and the presence of King John V of Portugal.

== Births ==
- July 14 – Ventura Rodríguez, Spanish architect (died 1785)
- August 11 – Giovanni Carlo Galli-Bibiena, Italian architect, designer and painter (died 1760)
- c. October – James Paine, English architect (died 1789)
- Adriano Cristofali, Veronese architect (died 1788)
