= Kitchen Ruin =

Monument, St. Petersburg, Russia

- Кухня-руина
- Location: Pushkin, Catherine Park, an island on Upper Ponds
- Type: building

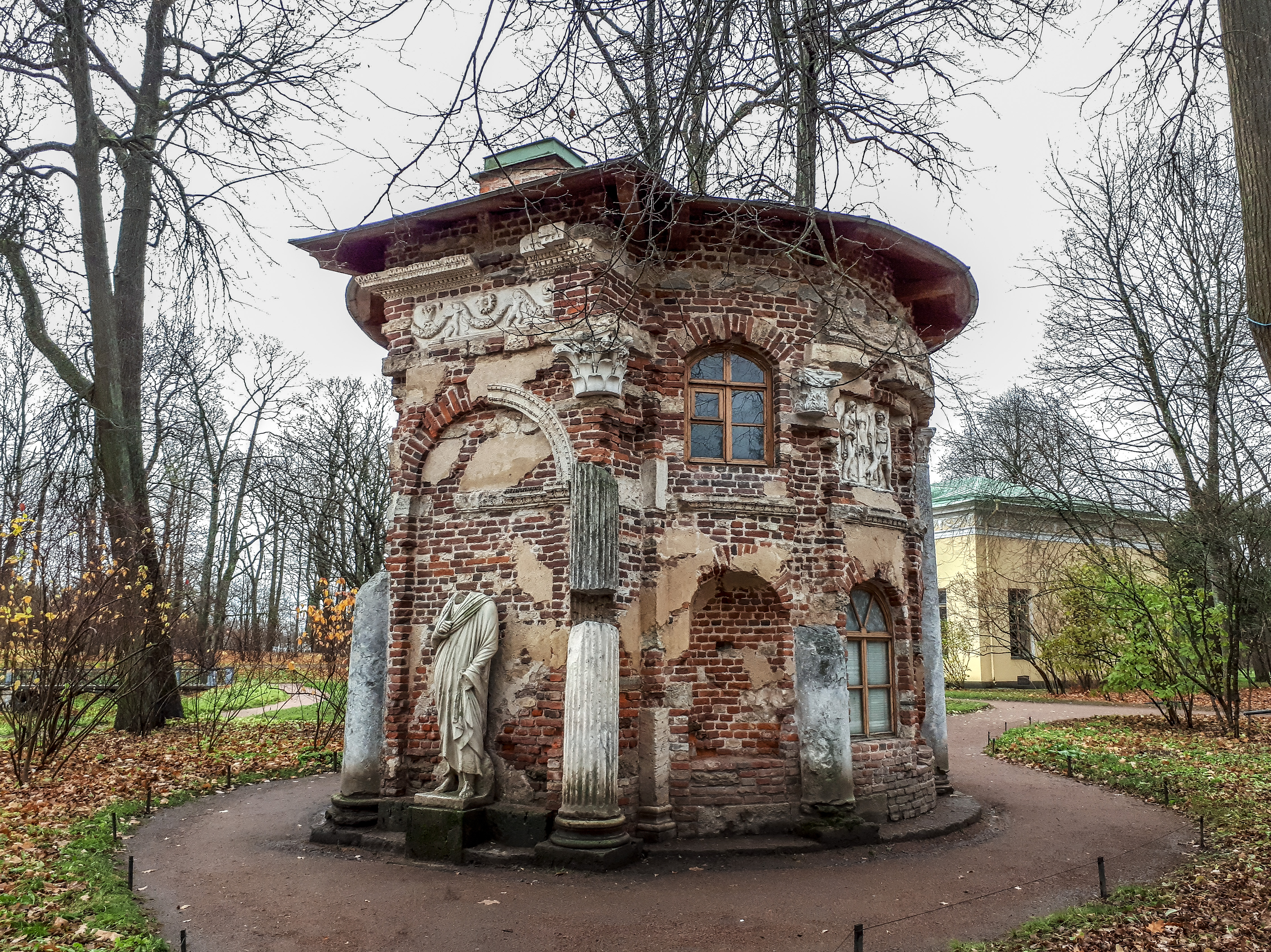

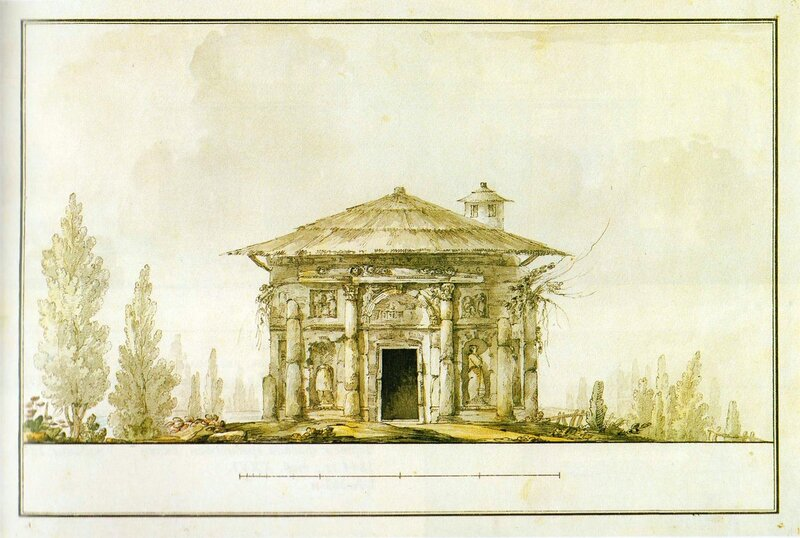
Kitchen Ruin in Quarenghi's drawing, 1780s

The Kitchen Ruin is an architectural monument located in Pushkin, St. Petersburg, Russia, in Catherine Park, on the island on Upper Ponds.

Every regular park ensemble of the 18th century was obliged to have Hermitage pavilions, Grottos, and artificial ruins. The Kitchen Ruin was built in 1785–1786 according to the project by Giacomo Quarenghi. It is a rotunda with two rectangular projections using authentic antique Italian fragments: fragments of columns, capitals, cornices, and friezes, on which garlands are carved. The pavilion can be entered through a semicircular niche. The masonry of the walls is partially exposed, the windows are asymmetric, and the gypsum reliefs based on models by Cesare Scaglia, installed in the niches of the upper part of the facade walls, are intentionally damaged, which together creates the impression of deep antiquity. The facade between the rectangular projections is decorated with columns.

== Literature ==
- Памятники архитектуры пригородов Ленинграда (in Russian). Leningrad: Стройиздат. 1985. p. 616.
