= Ruin Tower =

Historical monument in Russia

Coordinates: 59°42′35″N 30°23′2″E

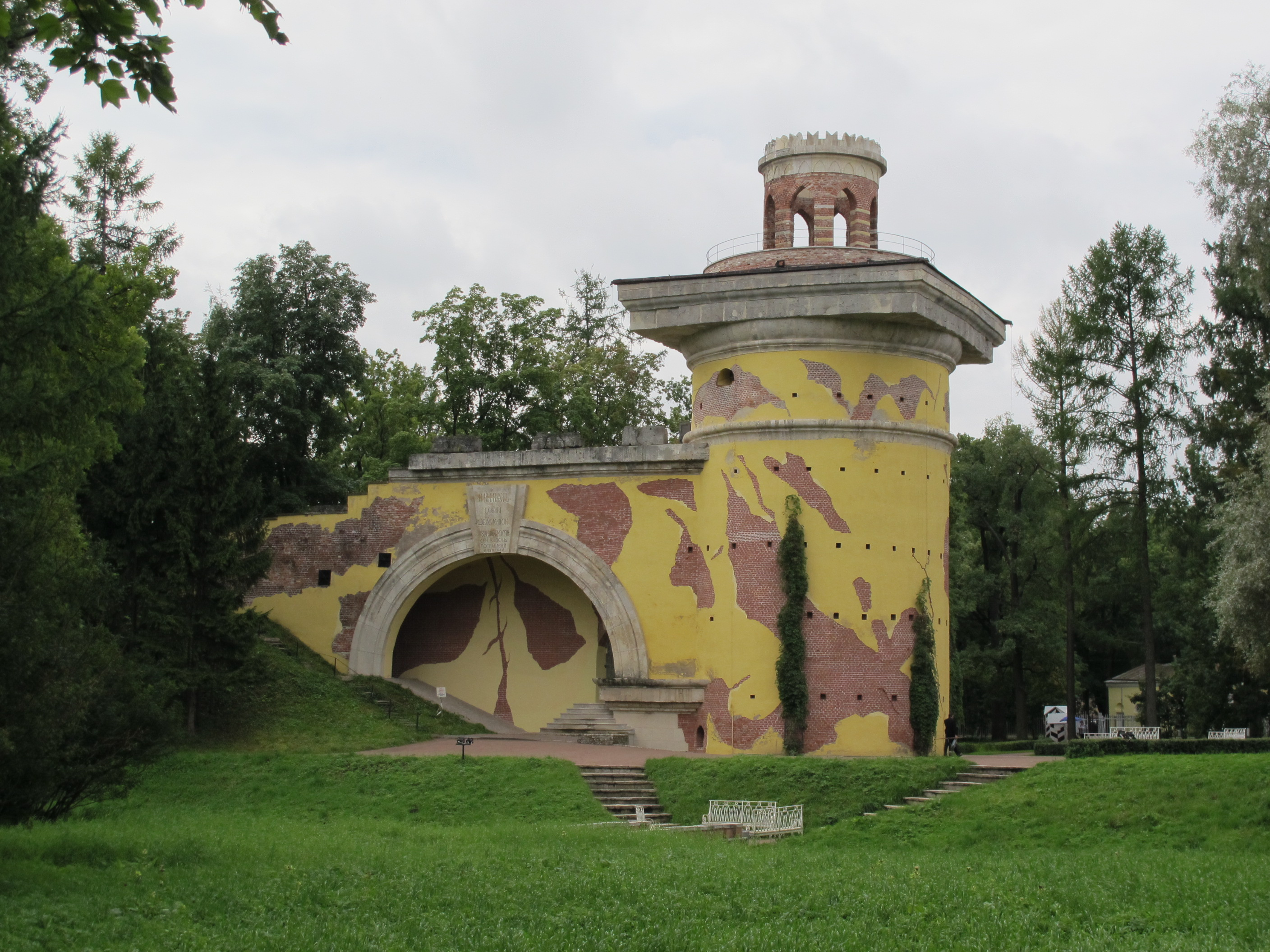
Ruin Tower (2011)

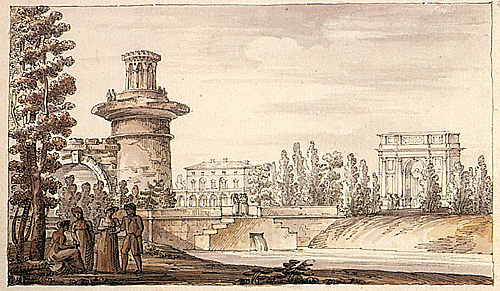
Ruin tower and Orlovsky gate

The Ruin Tower (Russian: Башня-руина) is an 18th-century monument in Ekaterininsky Park of Tsarskoye Selo - now Pushkin, a suburban town in eponymous borough of St. Petersburg, Russia. It was designed and constructed in 1771-1773 by German-Russian architect Yury Felten.

== History ==
The tower was erected in remembrance of heroic battles of the Russo-Turkish War of 1768–1774 by request of Catherine II. The civil works were conducted by architect I. M. Sitnikov. The powerful stone tower, in the form of a column of Tuscan order, is topped by a round arbour upon the abacus at a height of 21 metres. Views of the nearby lake and surrounding park can be observed through the arbour's Gothic lancet apertures.

In the summer of 1773, artist A. Belsky painted the external walls of the tower ruins and cracks have been cut in the plastered surface to simulate natural damage. In 1784, trees were planted along the edge of the embankment upon which the tower was sited. The tower's huge stone arch at its base enhances an impression that it extends deeply into the earth.

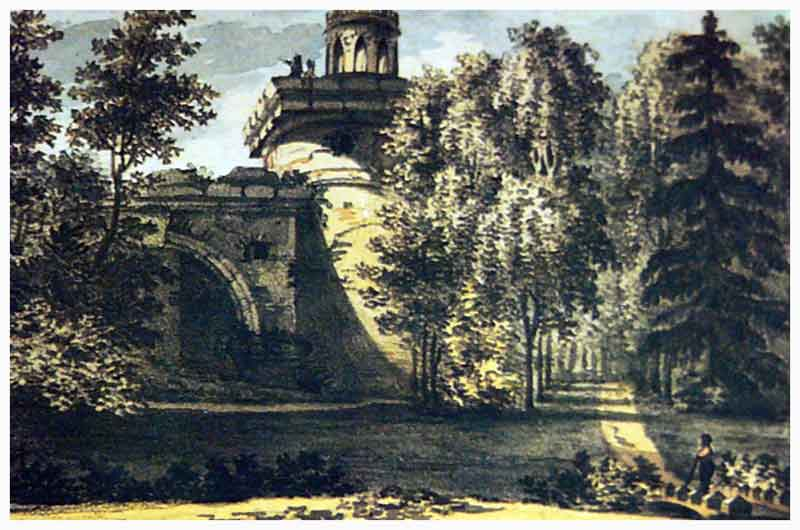
Ruin tower in 1820s

A Gothic pig-iron gate can be found at one end of the embankment. It was cast on J.M.Felten's model in 1782 at the Demidovsky factory in Ekaterinburg. It is notable as one of the first architectural products to be found in Russia made of pig-iron.

== Restoration ==
The first major repair of the tower was in 1883. In the Second World War, it sustained damage from shelling, causing fragmentation, hollows and cracks in the arches and eaves and major damage to the travertin. The arbour was half-destroyed.

A restoration plan was formulated in 1977 but inspection and clearance work did not begin until 1986. Experts of a joint venture between "Lenpolproekt" and the "Lenproektrestavratsiya" institute carried out design work and, from 1993, the Polish firm PKZ (Workshops on Restoration of Ancient Monuments) was appointed as contractor. The restoration was completed in 2006 and the pavilion was re-opened in August 2009. Now incorporated into a museum garden, it is open to the public daily from 11 am to 5 pm.
