= Catherine Palace =

Palace near St. Petersburg, Russia

- Russian: Екатерининский дворец, romanized: Yekaterininskiy dvorets
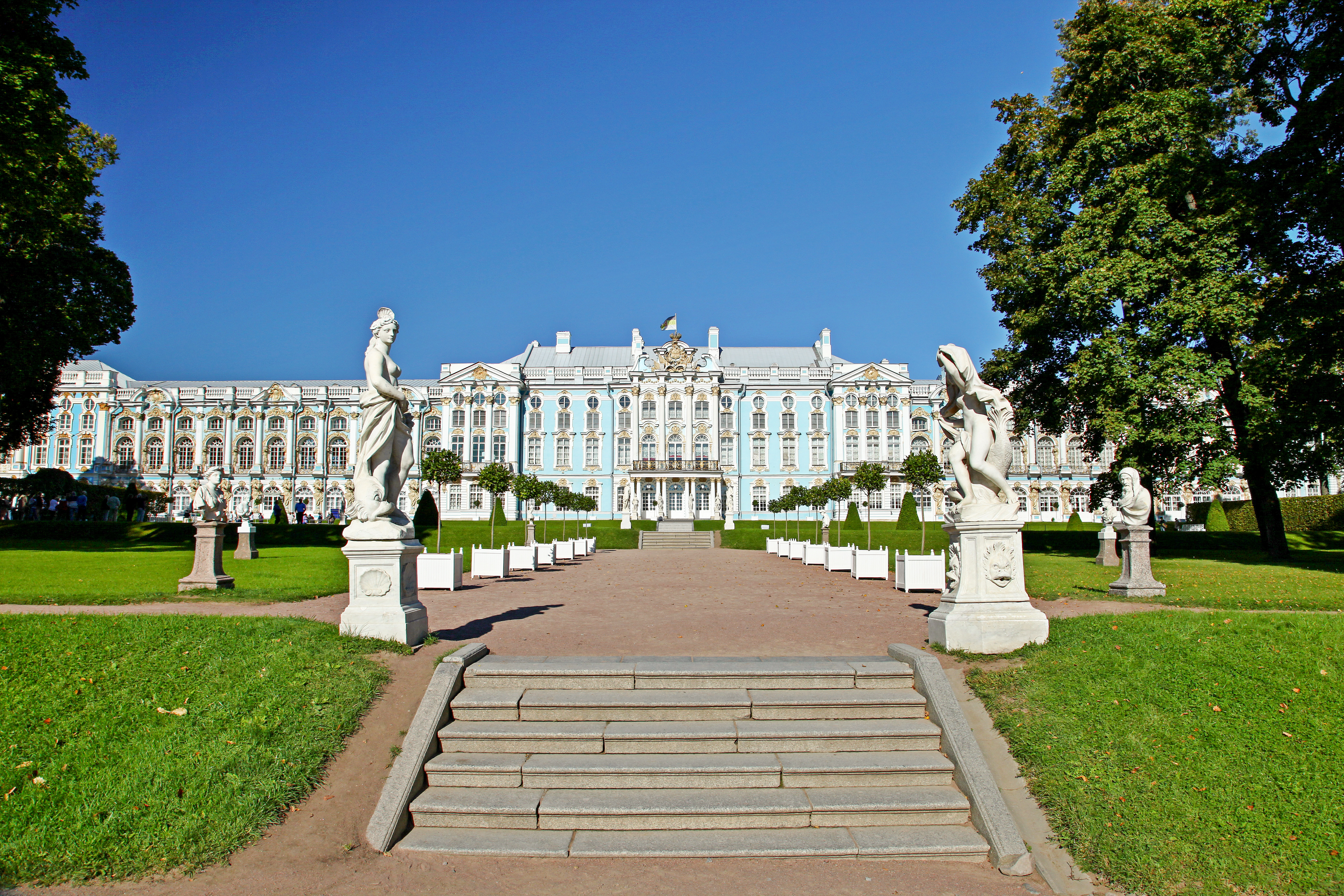
- View from the garden
- Interactive map of the Catherine Palace area

General information
- Type: Palace
- Architectural style: Neoclassical, Elizabethan Baroque and Rococo
- Location: Pushkin, Russia
- Coordinates: 59°42′58″N 30°23′44″E

The Catherine Palace (Russian: Екатерининский дворец, romanized: Yekaterininskiy dvorets, IPA: [jɪkətʲɪˈrʲinʲɪnskʲɪj dvɐˈrʲets]) is a Rococo palace in Tsarskoye Selo (Pushkin), located 30 kilometres (19 mi) south of St. Petersburg, Russia. It was the summer residence of the Russian tsars. The palace is part of the World Heritage Site Saint Petersburg and Related Groups of Monuments.

== History ==
Following the Great Northern War, Russia recovered the farm called Saari Mojs (a high place) or Sarskaya Myza, which resided on a hill 65 m in elevation. In 1710, Peter the Great gave the estate to his wife Catherine I, the village of which was initially called Sarskoye Selo, and then finally Tsarskoye Selo (Tsar's Village). In 1723, Catherine I's Stone Palace, designed by Johann Friedrich Braunstein and built by Johann Ferster, replaced the original wooden house. This was a two-storey sixteen-room building, with state chambers finished in polished alabaster, while the upper one included Gobelin tapestry. The southeast portion of the estate included a garden designed by Jan Roosen, with terraces, stone staircases, parterres, trellised arbours, and ponds, while a menagerie was located on the opposite of the estate.

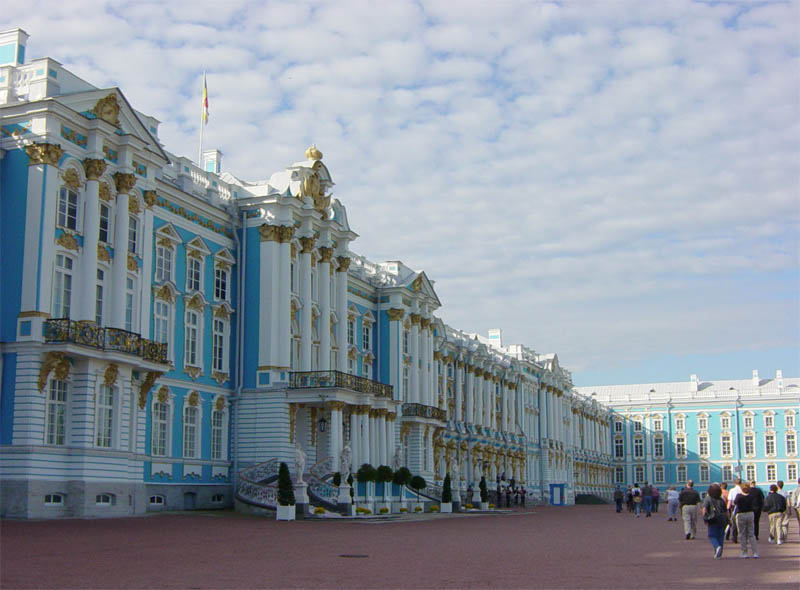
North side, carriage courtyard: all the stucco details sparkled with gold until 1773, when Catherine II had gilding replaced with olive drab paint.

During the reign of Peter the Great's daughter, Empress Elizabeth, Mikhail Zemtsov designed a new palace and work began in 1744. In 1745, Zemtsov's pupil, Andrei Kvasov, working with Savva Chevakinsky, expanded the palace to be 300 m long. This included a Middle House, two side wings, a chapel, and the Conservatory Hall, all connected by four galleries with hanging gardens. Then in 1751, Bartolomeo Rastrelli undertook a major reconstruction effort, integrating several buildings, giving the palace its distinctive snow-white columns, sky-blue walls, with gilded stucco, chapel cupolas, and sculptures requiring almost 100 kg of gold. Rastrelli's interiors were based on a Baroque style. Sculptor Johann Franz Dunker, master gilder Leprince, and interior painter Giuseppe Valeriani were some of the distinguished artists. Other notable rooms included the Chinese Room with its porcelain and Coromandel lacquer panels, the Portrait Hall, the Light Gallery, and the Amber Room with Andreas Schlüter's amber panels, while 5 anterooms were connected to the Great Hall, which measured 860 square meters. Construction ended in 1756, when the palace included 40 state apartments, and more than 100 private and service rooms. A New Garden was added, while the Old Garden was improved with a deepening of the Big Pond, connected to springs 6 km away, the addition of a Toboggan Slide, plus the Hermitage, Grotto, Island, and Mon Bijou pavilions.

Baroque architecture gave way to Neoclassical architecture in the 1770s, when Tsarskoye Selo became the summer residence of Catherine the Great's court. Yuri Velten redesigned the south facade of the palace, while the side wings were converted from one-storey into four-storey Zubov and Chapel Annexes. The Main Staircase was replaced by state and private rooms such as the Chinese Room, decorated with Charles Cameron designs, and a new staircase built in the center where the Chinese Room had stood. Cameron's 1780s interior designs included the Arabesque Room with arabesque painted ceiling, walls, and doors, while Greek and Roman classical motifs were used on the wall vertical panels. Cameron's Lyons Room used French golden-yellow silk on the walls, while the doors, stoves and panels used Lake Baikal lapis lazuli. The empress' bedroom used Wedgwood jasper bas-reliefs designed by John Flaxman and George Stubbs. The Blue Room, or "Snuff-box", incorporated white and bright blue glass on the walls. Giacomo Quarenghi designed the Mirror and Silver Rooms in 1789, while Rastrelli's hanging gardens were pulled down in 1773.

Vasily Neyolov's 1768 master plan for Tsarskoye Selo was elaborated in 1771 by Johann Busch and implemented. Antonio Rinaldi added the Chesme Column, Morea Column, and the Kagul Obelisk to commemorate the victorious Russo-Turkish War (1768–1774). Neyolov's Gothic monuments included the Admiralty, the Hermitage Kitchen and Red (Turkish) Cascade, and his Chinese motifs included the Creaking Pagoda and the Great Caprice. Neyolov's Early Classicism monuments included the Upper and Lower Baths. Neyolov built the Opera House in 1778–79. In the 1780s, Cameron added the Thermae as part of Catherine the Great's "Greek-Roman rhapsody", and started building the Chinese Village. Quarenghi added a music pavilion and Ceres temple to an Upper Pond island. His Kitchen Ruin folly was added next to the Concert Hall. Neyolov's Babolovo Palace was added by 1785, and in the 1790s, Quarenghi built the Alexander Palace. In 1809, Luigi Rusca built the Granite Terrace. In 1817, Stasov built the Triumphal Arch commemorating the Russian repulsion of the French invasion of Russia. From 1851 to 1852, Monighetti added the Turkish bathhouse.

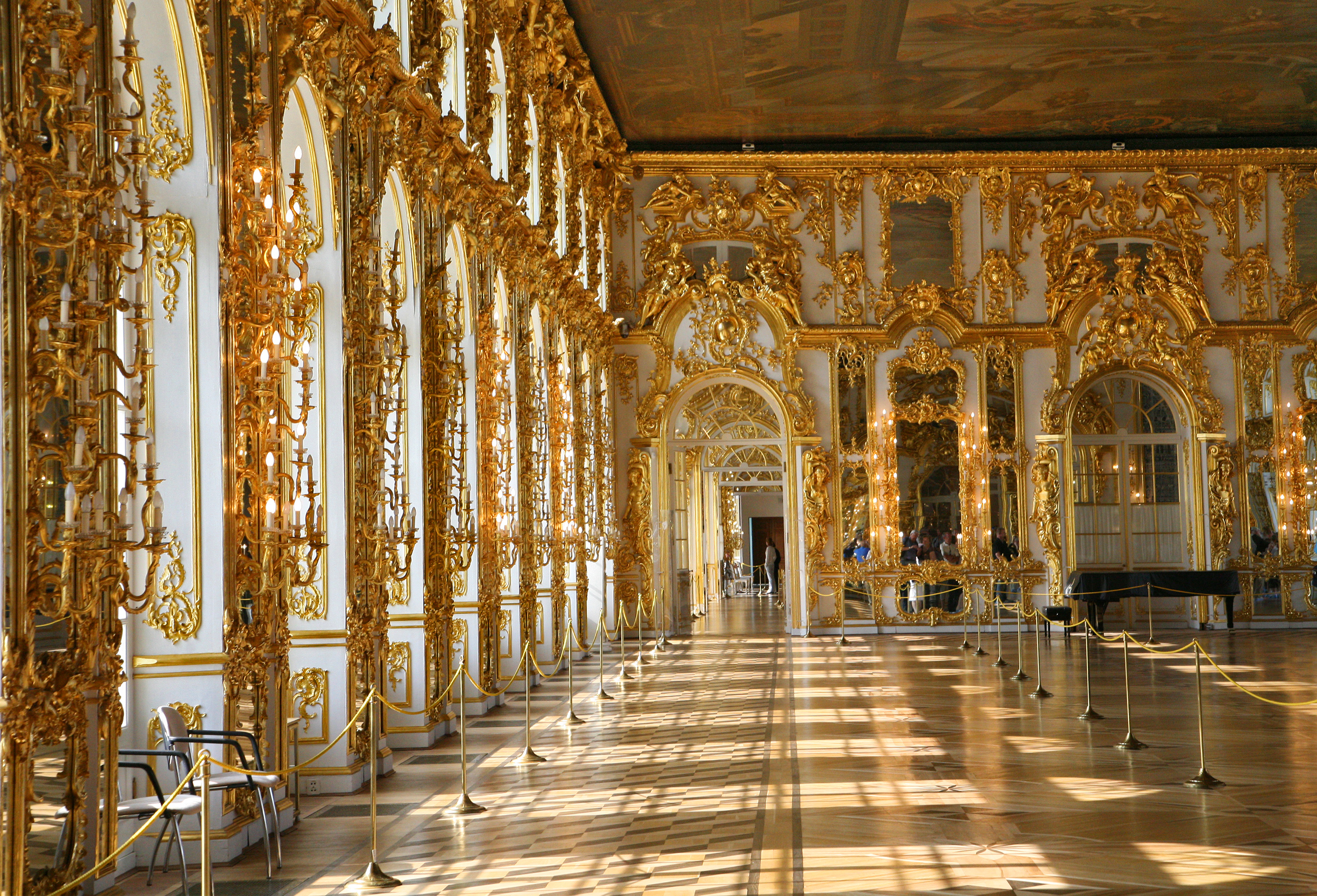
The ballroom

With Catherine the Great's death in 1796, park construction ceased. Vasily Stasov restored the damage caused by the 1820 fire, which included Rastrelli's chapel and adjoining apartments. In the 1850s, Andrei Stakenschneider decorated the state room ceilings with stucco ornament and Hermitage Museum canvases. In 1860, Ippolito Monighetti reconstructed the central staircase and main porch.

When the German forces retreated after the siege of Leningrad in World War II, they intentionally destroyed the residence, leaving only the hollow shell of the palace behind. Soviet archivists had managed to document a fair amount of the interior before the war, which proved of great importance in reconstructing the palace starting in 1957, by the State Control Commission for the Preservation of Monuments under the direction of Alexander Kedrinsky.

== Layout ==
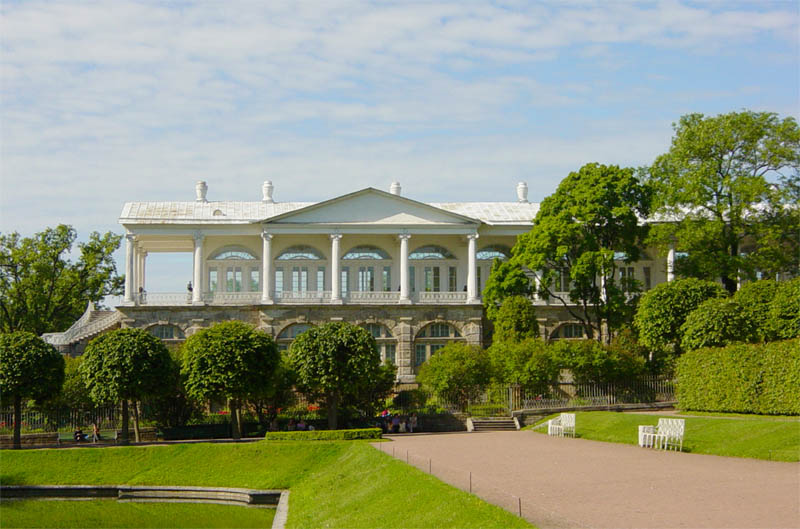
The Cameron Gallery in the 21st century

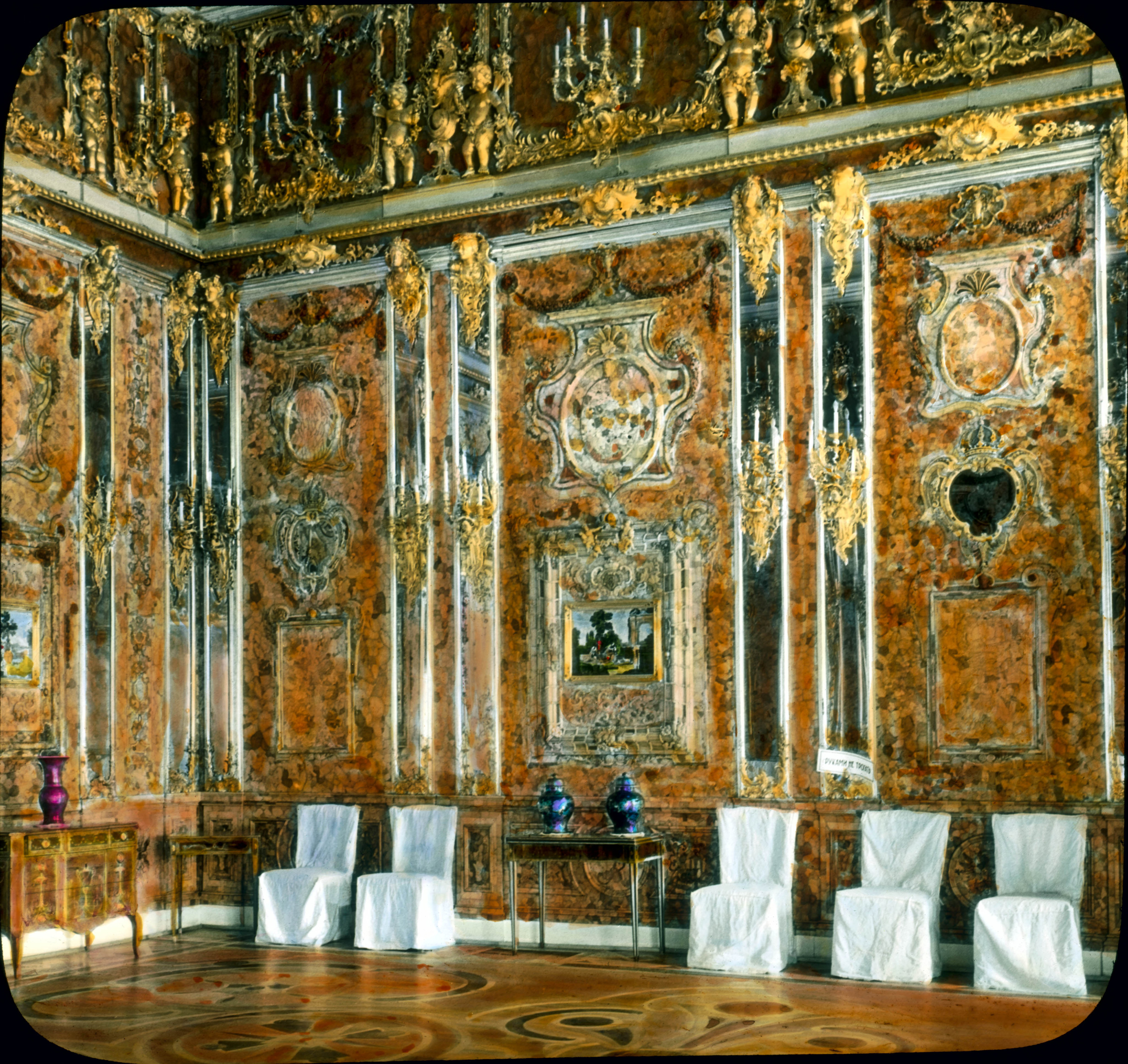
The Amber Room

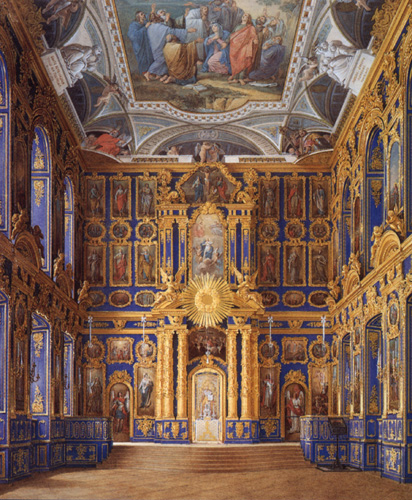
The Chapel of Catherine Palace

Although Stasov's and Cameron's Neoclassical interiors are manifestations of late 18th-century and early 19th-century taste, the palace is best known for Rastrelli's grand suite of formal rooms known as the Golden Enfilade. It starts at the spacious airy ballroom, the "Grand Hall" or the "Hall of Lights", with a spectacular painted ceiling, and comprises numerous distinctively decorated smaller rooms, including the recreated Amber Room.

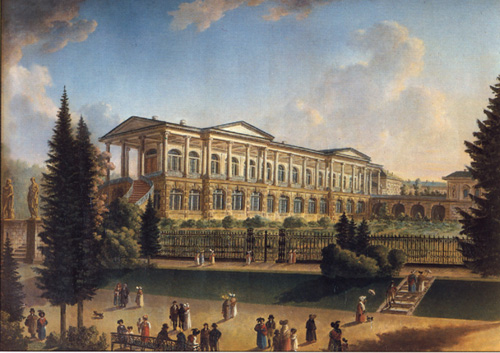
The Cameron Gallery in the 18th century.

The Great Hall, or Light Gallery, as it was called in the 18th century, is a formal apartment in the Russian baroque style designed by Bartolomeo Rastrelli between 1752 and 1756. The Great Hall was intended for more important receptions such as balls, formal dinners, and masquerades. The hall was painted in two colors and covers an area of approximately 1,000 square meters. Occupying the entire width of the palace, the windows on the eastern side look out onto the park while the windows of the western side look out to the palace plaza. In the evening, 696 lamps are lit on about a dozen chandeliers located near the mirrors. The hall's sculptural and gilded carvings and ornamentation were created according to sketches by Rastrelli and models by Johann Franz Dunker.

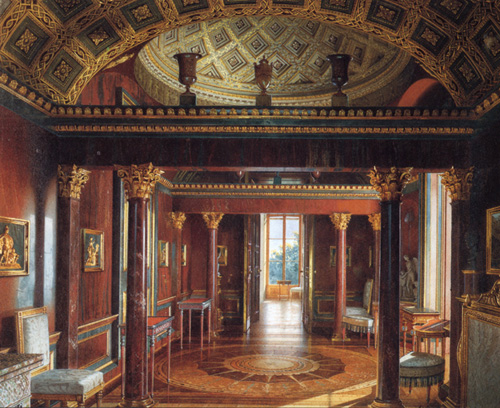
Interior of the Agate Rooms of Catherine Palace.

Beyond the Great Hall is the Courtiers-in-Attendance Dining Room. The room was designed by Rastrelli in the mid-18th century. The small room is lit by four windows which look out into the formal courtyard. The architect placed false windows with mirrors and mirrored glass on the opposite wall, making the hall more spacious and bright. Decorated in the typical Baroque interior style, the hall is filled with gilded wall-carvings, complex gilded pieces on the doors, and ornamental patterns of stylized flowers. The ceiling mural was painted by a well-known student of the Russian School from the mid-18th century. It is based on the Greek myth of the sun god Helios and the goddess of the dawn, Eos.

Across from the Courtiers-in-Attendance Dining Room, on the other side of the Main Staircase, is the White Formal Dining Room. The hall was used for the empresses' formal dinners or "evening meals". The walls of the dining hall were decorated with the utmost extravagance with gilded carvings. The furnishings consist of gilded carvings on the consoles. Some of the furniture which can be seen in the room today is original whilst other pieces are reproductions. The painted mural, The Triumph of Apollo, is a copy of a painting completed in the 16th century by Italian artist Guido Reni.

The Portrait Hall is a formal apartment covering 100 square meters. The room's walls boast large formal portraits of Empress Catherine I and Empress Elizabeth Petrovna, as well as paintings of Natalya Alexeyevna, sister of Peter the Great, and Empress Catherine II. The inlaid floors of the hall contain precious woods. The Drawing Room of Alexander I was designed between 1752 and 1756 and belonged to the Emperor's private suite. The drawing room stood out from the rest of the formal rooms in the palace due to the fact that the walls were covered in Chinese silk. Other decor in the room was typical for the palace's formal rooms—a ceiling mural and gilded carvings. The elegant card tables and inlaid wood commode display Japanese, Chinese, and Berlin porcelain.

The Green Dining Room, which replaced Rastrelli's "Hanging Garden" in 1773, is the first of the rooms in the northern wing of the Catherine Palace, designed by Cameron for the future Emperor Paul and his wife. The room's pistachio-coloured walls are lined with stucco figures by Ivan Martos. During the great fire of 1820 the room was seriously damaged, thus sharing the fate of other Cameron interiors. It was subsequently restored under Stasov's direction.

Other interiors by Cameron include the Waiters' Room, with an inlaid floor of rosewood, amaranth and mahogany and stylish Chippendale card tables; the Blue Formal Dining-Room, with white-and-blue silk wallpaper and Carrara marble chimneys; the Chinese Blue Drawing Room, a curious combination of Adam style with Chinoiserie; the Choir Anteroom, with walls lined in apricot-colored silk; and the columned boudoir of Alexander I, executed in the Pompeian style.

== See also ==
- List of Baroque residences
