= Chesme Column =

Rostral column in Saint Petersburg, Russia

Coordinates: 59.7100°N 30.3937°E

- Чесменская колонна
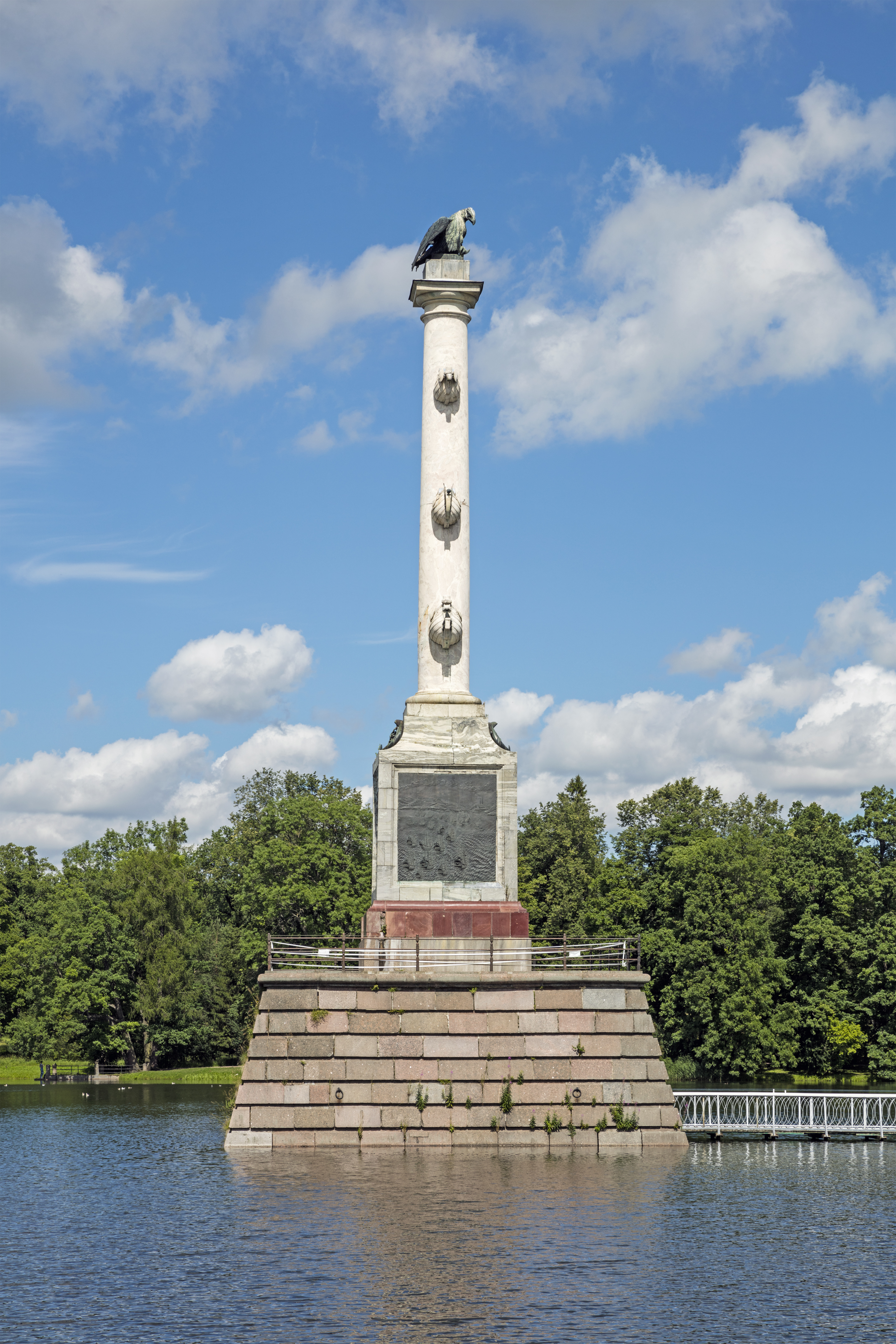
- Interactive map of Chesme Column
- Location: Catherine Park
- Designer: Antonio Rinaldi
- Type: Victory column
- Material: Bronze, marble, granite
- Height: 25 metres (82 ft)
- Beginning date: 1774
- Completion date: 1778
- Restored date: 1996

The Chesme Column (Russian: Чесменская колонна, romanized: Chesmenskaya kolonna) is a rostral column (a type of victory column) in the Catherine Park at the Catherine Palace, a former Russian royal residence at Tsarskoye Selo, a suburb of Saint Petersburg. The column commemorates three Russian naval victories in the 1768–1774 Russo-Turkish War: the Battle of Chios, the Battle of Chesma and the Battle of Mytilene. It was constructed from 1774 to 1778 in the large pond of the landscape park of the Catherine Palace to Antonio Rinaldi's designs.

The column is decorated with the rostra of three ships' bows, and crowned by a bronze figure of an eagle (a symbol of Russia) crushing a crescent (a symbol of Turkey). The column stands on a grey marble pedestal, on three sides of which are bronze bas-reliefs illustrating the Russian victories, while the fourth side is inscribed with a description of the battles. The bas-reliefs were destroyed by the Germans during World War II, and subsequently replaced using old photographs. The column was reopened in June 1996, commemorating the 300th anniversary of the Russian Navy. The pedestal rests on a stepped pyramid-like granite platform, with an arched opening with a grille leading to a flight of steps providing access to the pedestal.

== Gallery ==
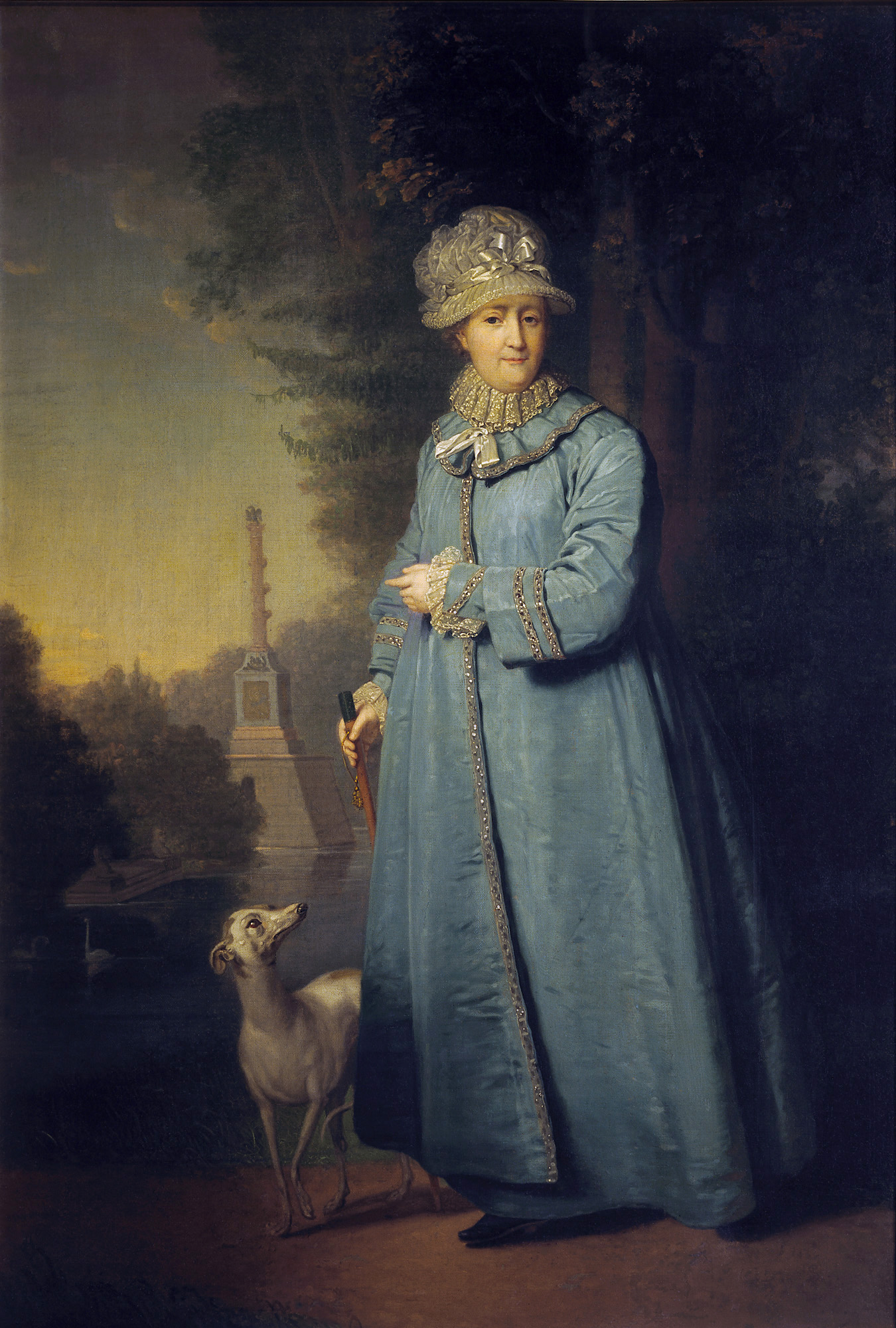
Catherine II strolling in the park at Tsarskoye Selo with the Chesme Column in the background, painting by Vladimir Borovikovsky

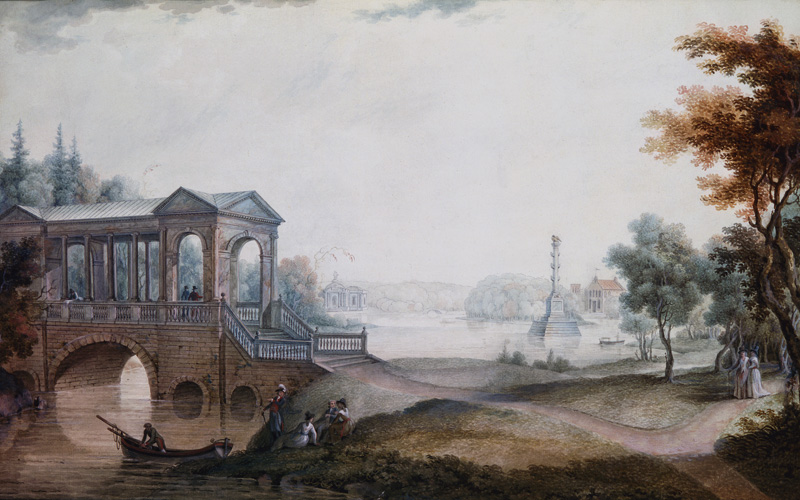
Marble Bridge in Tsarskoye Selo (1774). The Chesme Column is seen in the distance

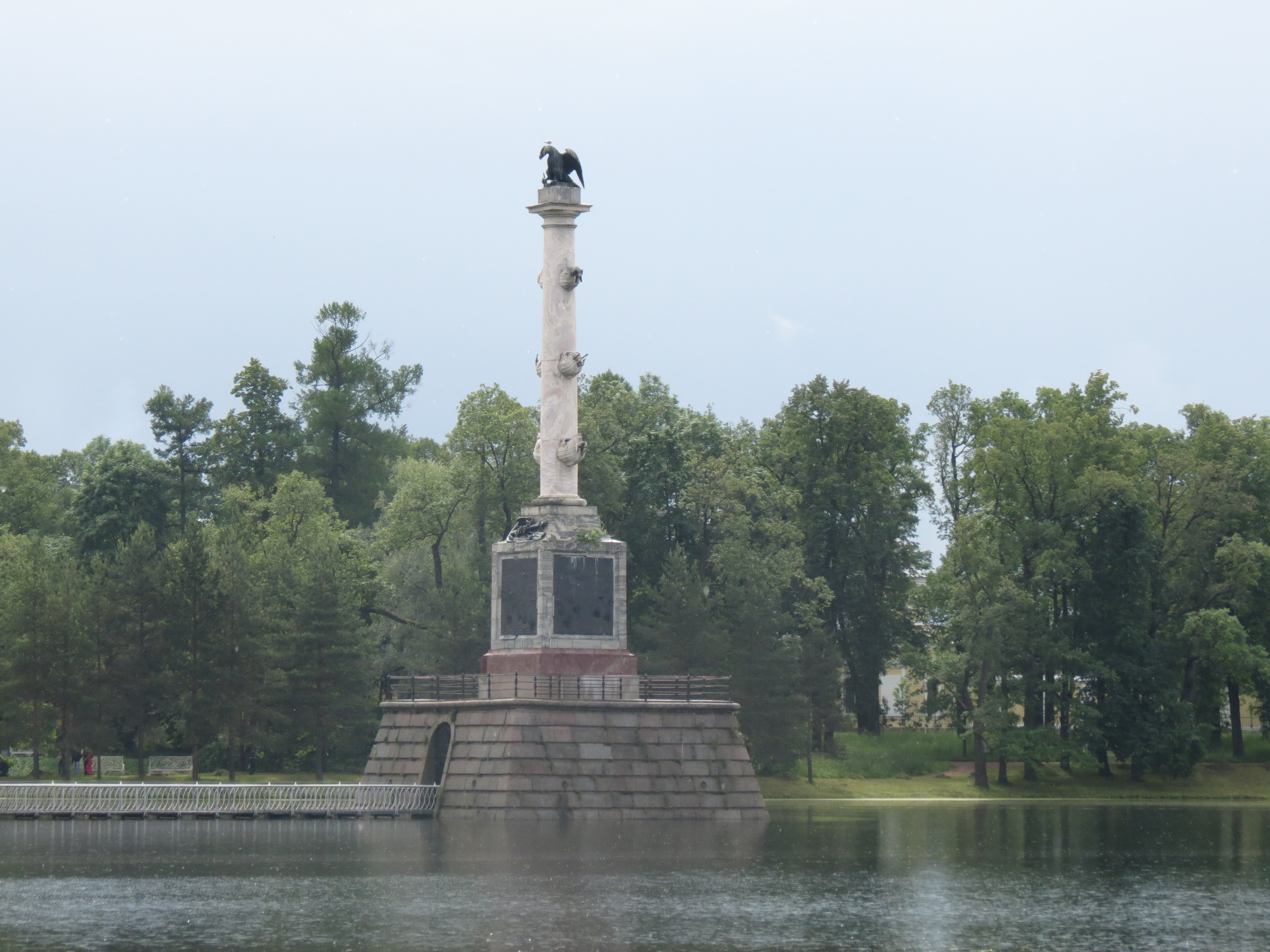
Side view shows an entrance leading into the base pedestal.

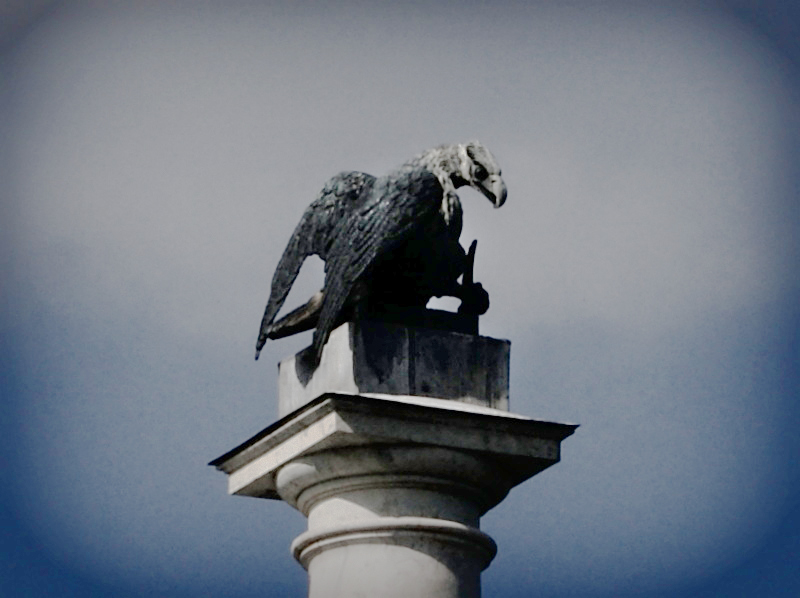
Eagle crushing a crescent moon

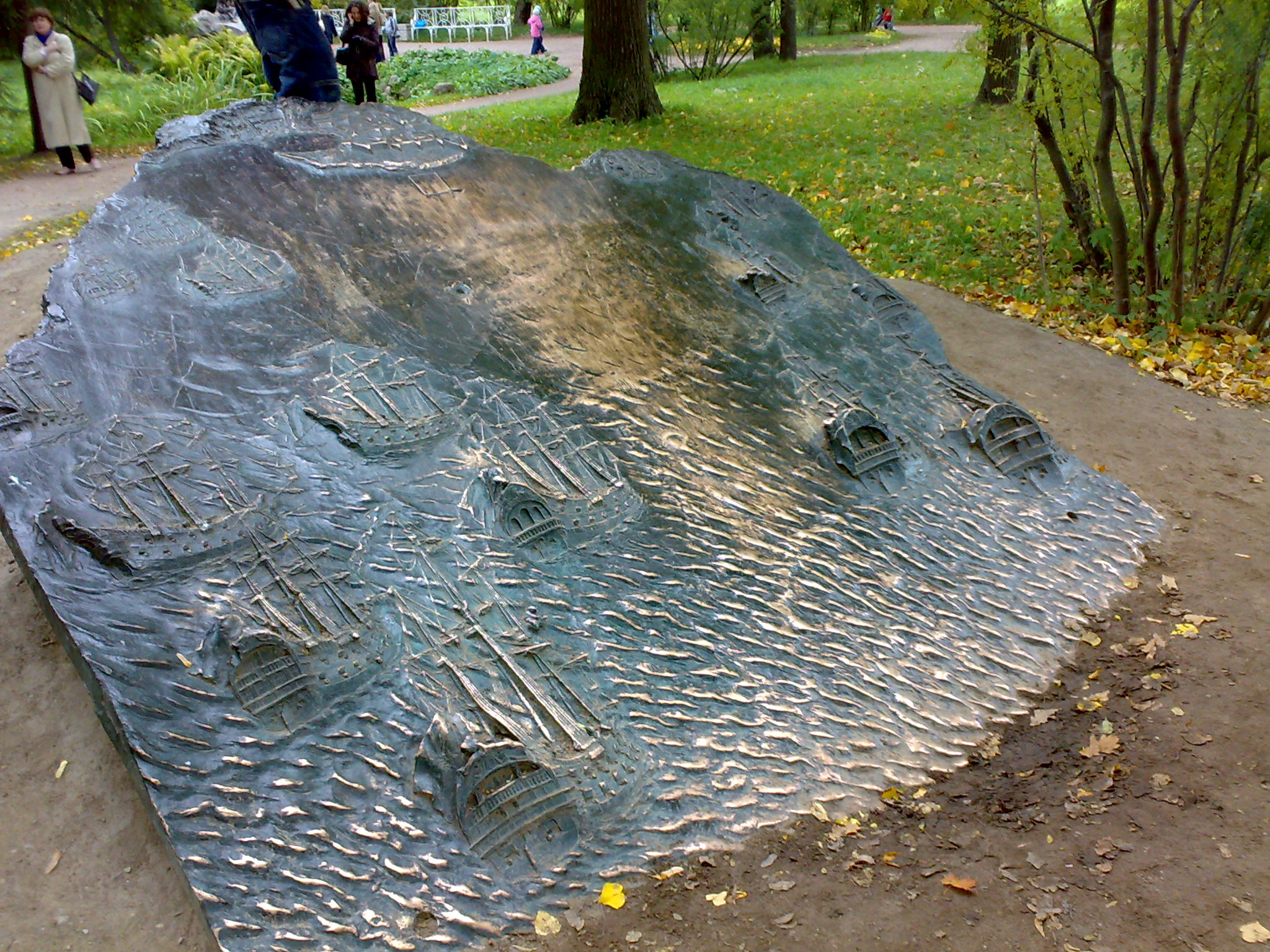
A fragment of the original bas-relief found at the bottom of the pond
