= Kagul Obelisk =

Monument in Saint Petersburg, Russia

Coordinates: 59°42′51.67″N 30°23′31.47″E

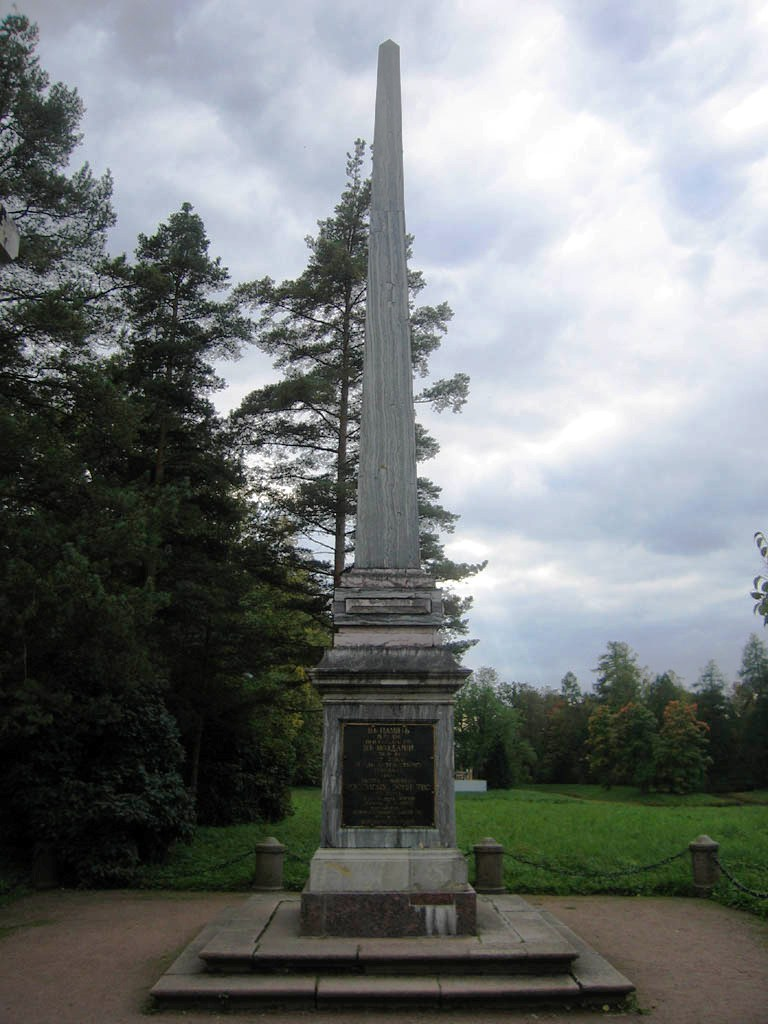
Kagul Obelisk.

The Kagul Obelisk (Russian: Кагульский обелиск) in Tsarskoye Selo is a commemorative obelisk. It is one of several such structures erected on behest of Catherine II of Russia in 1772 to commemorate Pyotr Rumyantsev's victory in the Battle of Kagul. Designed by Antonio Rinaldi, the dark grey-and-red marble obelisk stands in the landscape park of the Catherine Palace.

The inscription on the pedestal reads: "In memory of the victory at the Kagul River in Moldavia, July 21, 1770, under the command of Count Peter Rumyantsev the Russian army of seventeen thousand caused the Turkish Vizier Galil-Bey and his army of one hundred thousand and a half to flee to the Danube".
