= Marble Bridge =

Bridge in Pushkin, Russia

Coordinates: 59°42′37.0″N 30°23′20.5″E

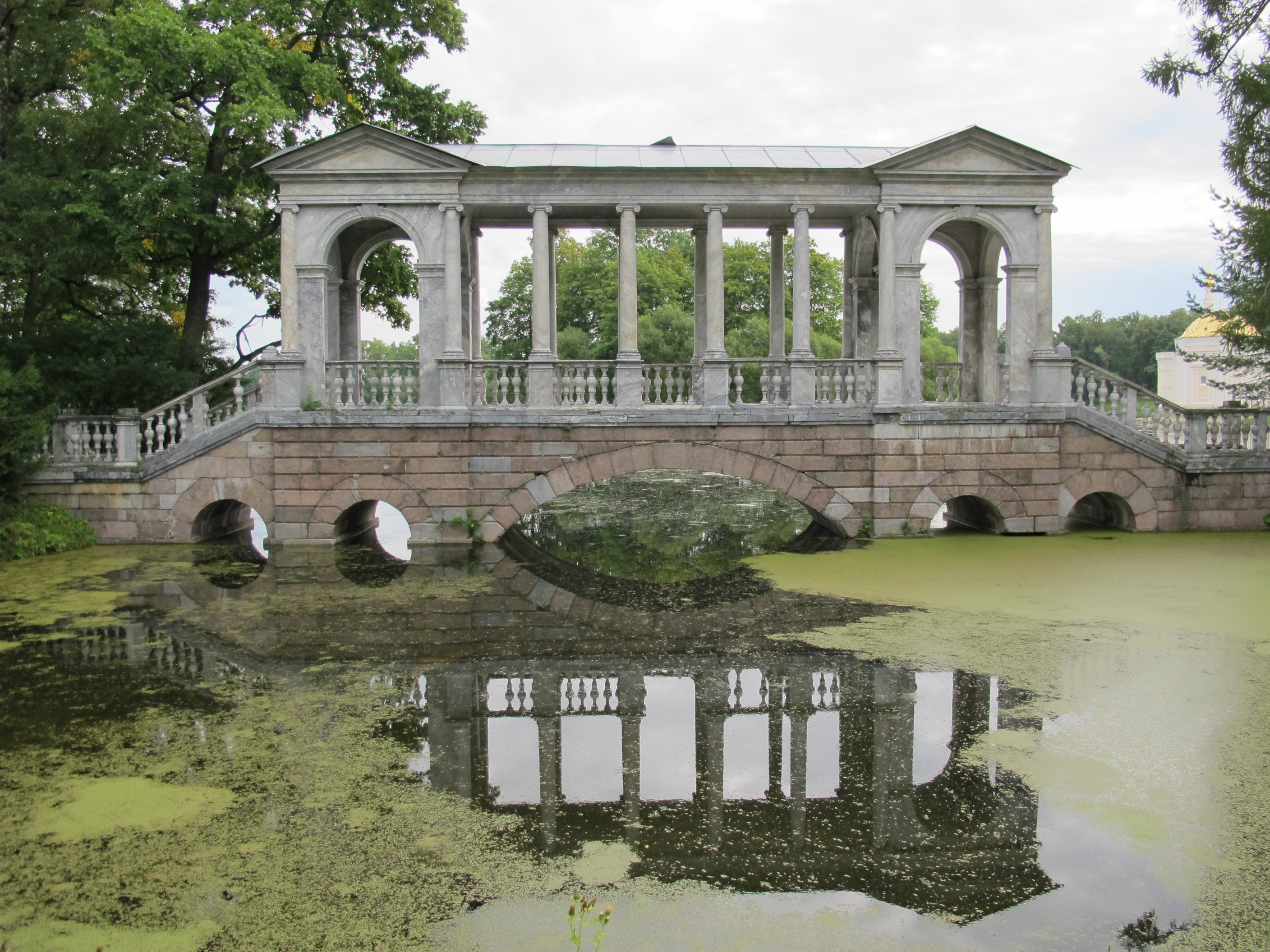
The Marble Bridge, 2011

The Marble Bridge (or "Siberian Marble Gallery") is a decorative pedestrian roofed Palladian bridge (gallery walkway) in Empress Catherine Park in the former royal residence Tsarskoye Selo (now town of Pushkin) near Saint Petersburg, Russia. It connects the Swan Islands — an artificial archipelago of seven islets in the landscape park of Tsarskoe Selo — spanning a rivulet flowing between several ponds.

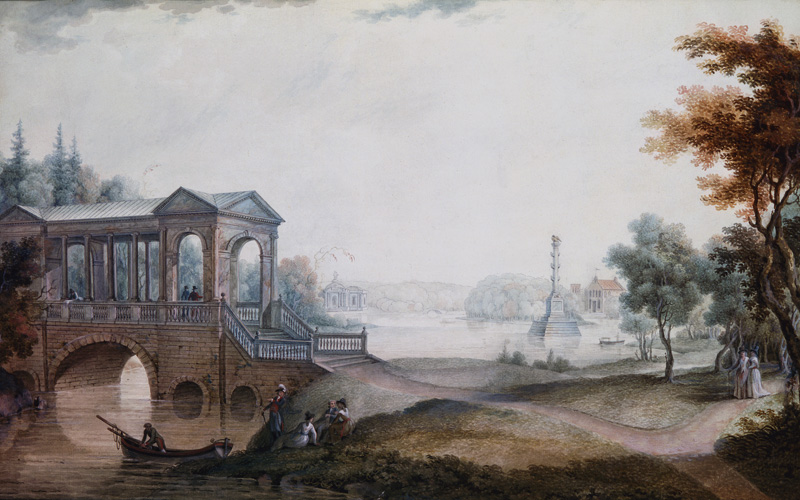
The Marble Bridge in 1774, with the Chesme Column seen in the distance

The bridge was modelled after the Palladian Bridge (1736) in the park of Wilton House, in England, and served as a showcase for Ural marble. All the details of the bridge — including the granite Ionic colonnade — were produced in Yekaterinburg, transported to Tsarskoe Selo and then assembled in the workshop of Vincenzo Tortori in 1774. It is probably called Siberian due to its construction with marble from the Urals.
