= Babolovo Palace =

Ruined Russian palace

Coordinates: 59°42′31.40″N 30°20′39.92″E

Babolovo or Babolovka was a dacha (myza) of Prince Potemkin in Tsarskoe Selo.

It was in 1780 that Catherine II of Russia presented the grounds adjoining the Catherine Park and the Alexander Park to her then-favourite, Potemkin. A temporary wooden palace was built to house the lovers' trysts. It was rebuilt in stone to a Gothic Revival design by Ilya Neyelov between 1782 and 1785. The Babolovsky Palace was essentially a summerhouse with seven rooms giving on to a park, a quaint octagonal tower and no second floor.

Alexander I of Russia used the palace for his furtive rendezvous with Sophia Velho, a court banker's daughter. He commissioned Vasily Stasov to redesign the palace. The tower was replaced with a huge bath hewn from a red granite monolith, known as the "Tsar Bath". Engineer Agustín de Betancourt had it placed within the room before the walls were constructed. The bath weighed 48 tons and was 196 cm high.

The palace fell into disrepair after the Russian Revolution and currently stands in ruins. The granite bath mentioned in one of Pushkin's first poems is still in situ. Other structures in the Babolovsky Park (which covers some 300 ha) have disappeared, apart from an aqueduct from the 1770s and Adam Menelaws' gate separating the two parks.

== Architectural features ==
A stone building was erected to replace the wooden five-room house located at the edge of the forest near the village of Babolovo. The construction began on November 2, 1782, the author of the project was architect Neelov. Asymmetrical in the plan, the one-storey structure was erected on a hill on the bank of the Silver Pond. The two main buildings, converging at an angle, were connected by an octagonal tower covered with a hipped roof. The façades were designed in the neo-Gothic style, with parapets in the form of battlements. The walls made of red bricks were plastered on the outside (excluding the anteroom and the bathroom pavilion), painted white and decorated with rustication. The plinth of the palace and its cornices are made of light Putilov stone. The cornices are decorated with light modules. The door and window platbands had two different designs - the plastered ones were painted white or the platbands were decorated with details of light Pudost stone.

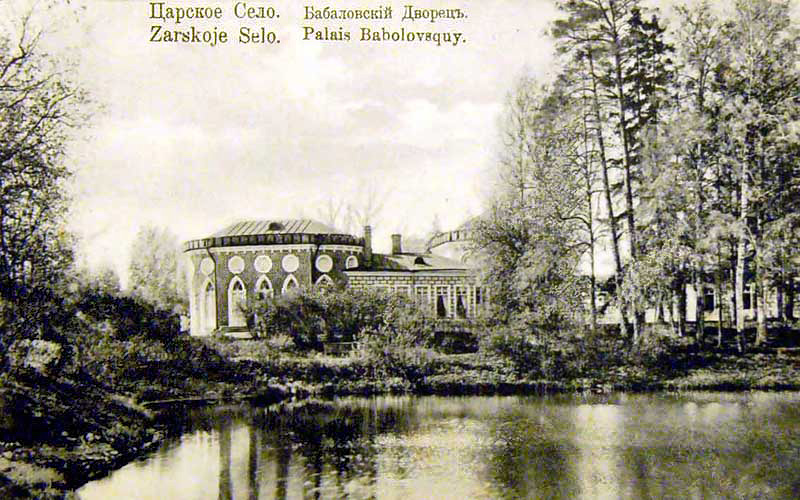
The palace in the early 20th century

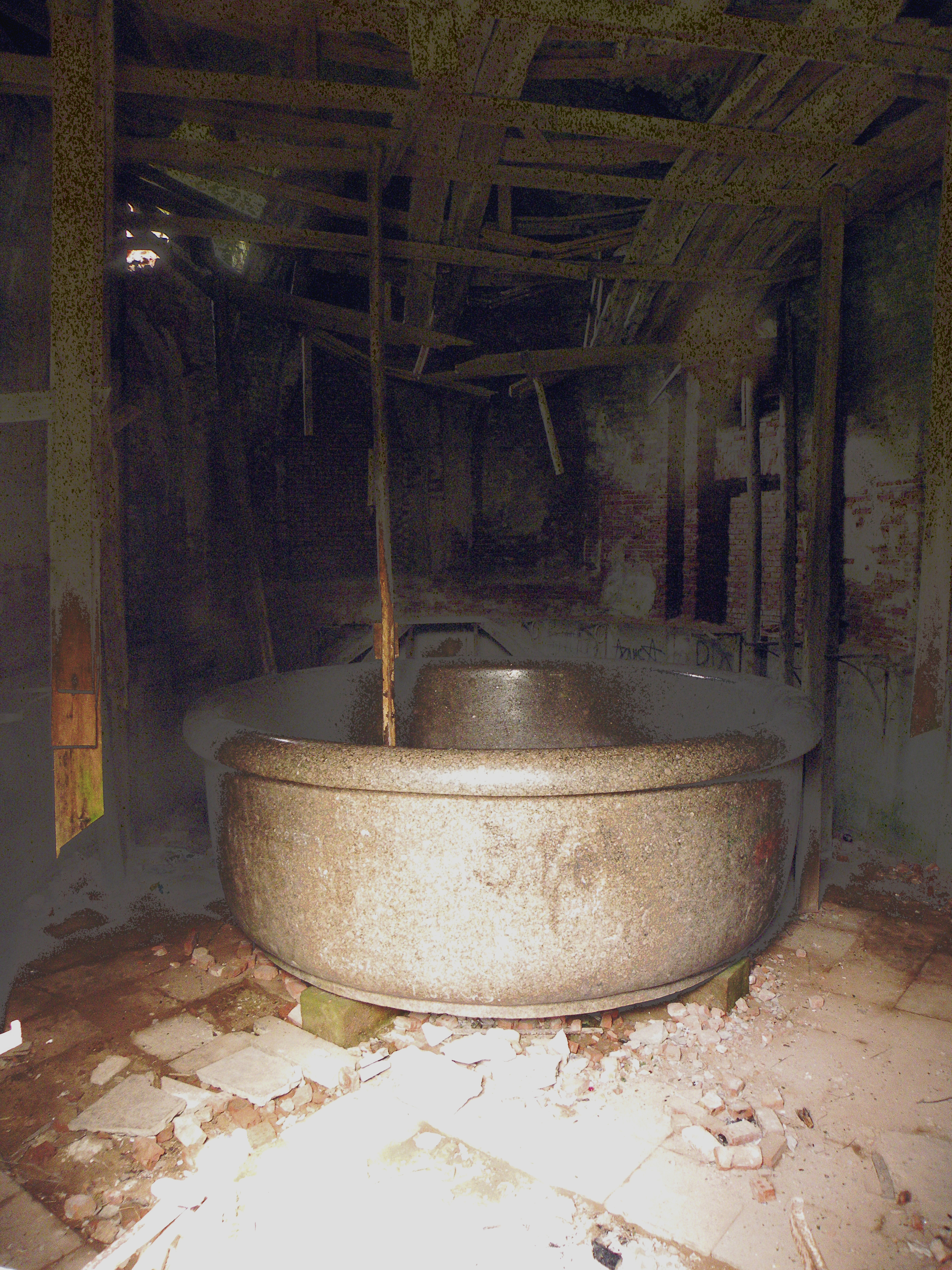
The famed "Tsar Bath"

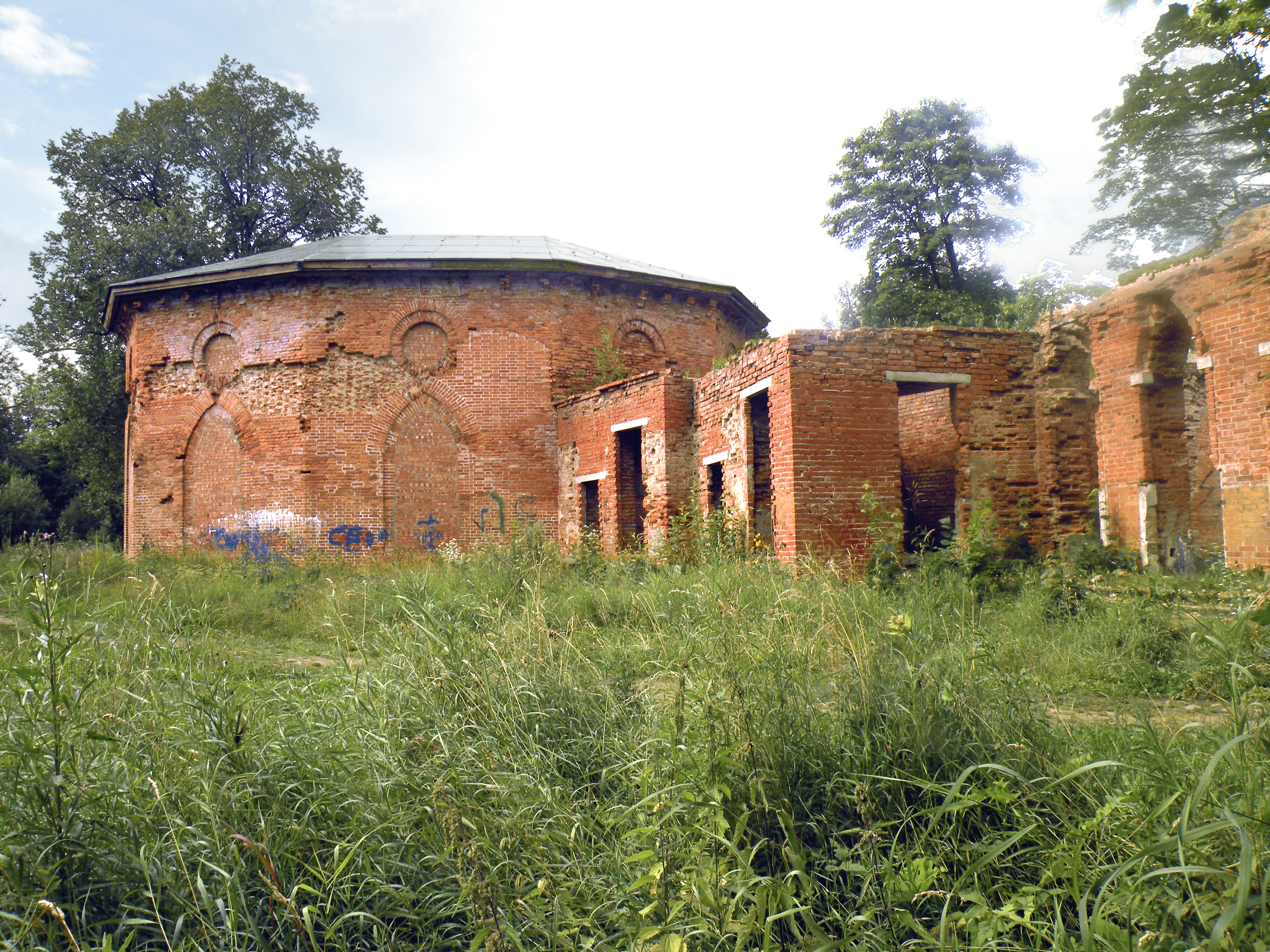
The ruins of Babolovsky Palace in 2009
