= Antonio Rinaldi (architect) =

Italian architect (1709–1794)

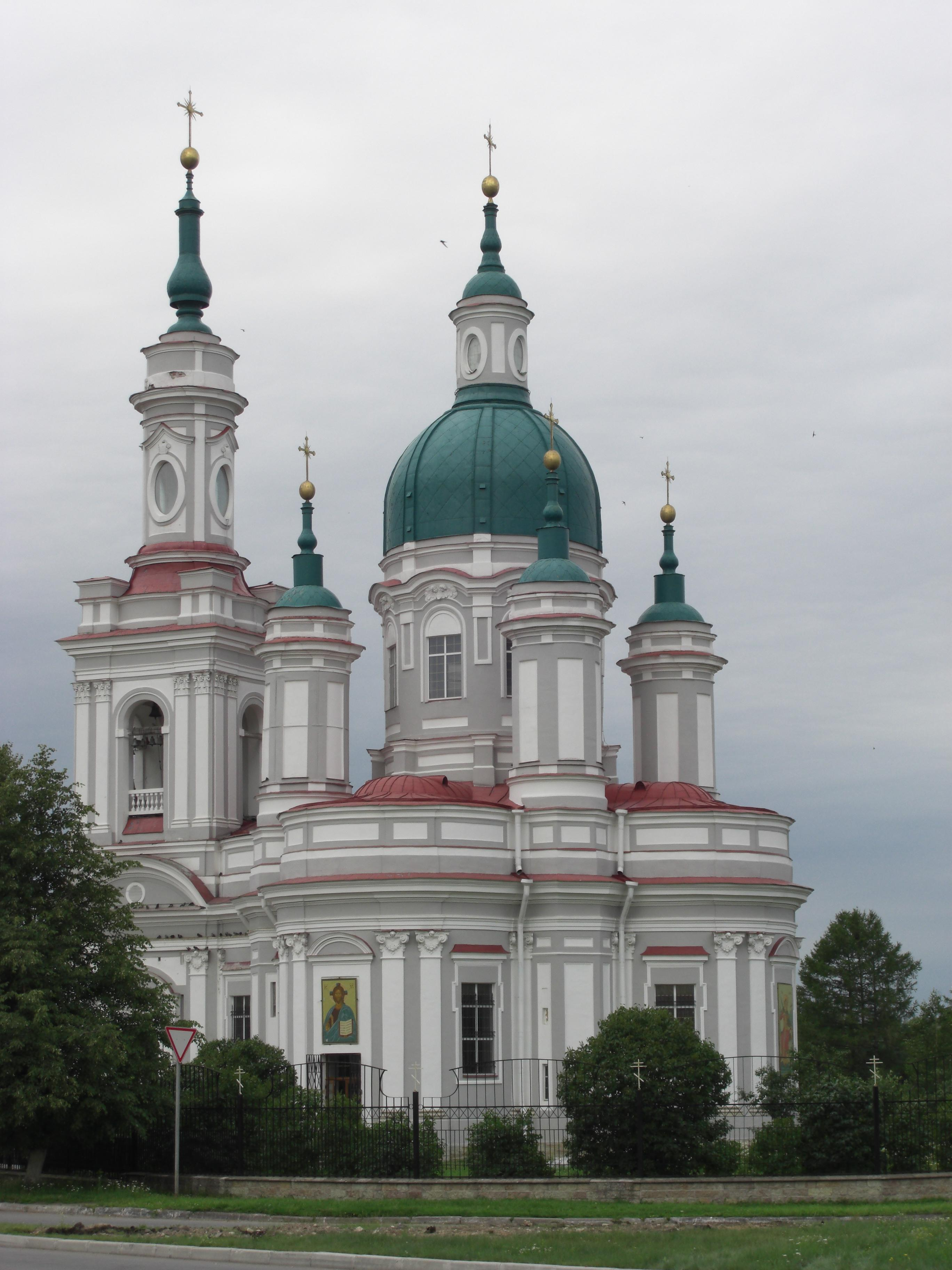
Rinaldi's cathedral in Kingisepp (Yamburg), 1764

Antonio Rinaldi (Palermo, 25 August 1709 – Rome, 10 April 1794) was an Italian architect, trained by Luigi Vanvitelli, who worked mainly in Russia.

== Life ==
In 1751, during a trip to England, he was summoned by Hetman Kirill Razumovsky to decorate his residences in what is now Ukraine. To this early period belong the Resurrection cathedral in Pochep near Bryansk and the Catherine Cathedral in Yamburg (now Kingisepp) near St. Petersburg (illustrated, right), where Rinaldi successfully expressed the domed, centrally-planned form required by traditional Russian Orthodox practice in a confident Italian Late Baroque vocabulary.

His first important secular commission was the Novoznamenka chateau of Chancellor Woronzow. In 1754, he was appointed chief architect of the young court, i.e., the future Peter III and Catherine II, who resided at Oranienbaum. In that town he executed his best-known baroque designs: the Palace of Peter III (1758–1760), the sumptuously decorated Chinese Palace (1762–1768), and the Ice-Sliding Pavilion (1762–1774).

In the 1770s, Rinaldi served as the main architect of Count Orlov, who was Catherine's prime favourite and the most powerful man in the country. During this period, he built two grandiose Neoclassical residences, namely the Marble Palace on the Palace Embankment in St. Petersburg and the roomy Gatchina Castle, which was subsequently acquired by Emperor Paul and partly remodelled. He also designed for Orlov several monuments in Tsarskoe Selo, notably the Orlov Gates, Kagul Obelisk and the Chesma Column. He completed the work started by Jean-Baptiste Vallin de la Mothe on the Catholic Church of St. Catherine.

Rinaldi's last works represent a continuous transition from the dazzling rococo of interiors to the reserved and clear-cut treatment of facades characteristic of Neoclassicism. These include two St. Petersburg cathedrals, one dedicated to St. Isaac the Dalmatian and subsequently demolished to make way for the present Empire-style structure, and the other, dedicated to Prince Vladimir and still standing.

In 1784, the old master resigned his posts on account of bad health and returned to Italy. He died in Rome in 1794.
