= Imperial Cabinet of the Russian Empire =

Imperial Cabinet
- Императорский кабинет
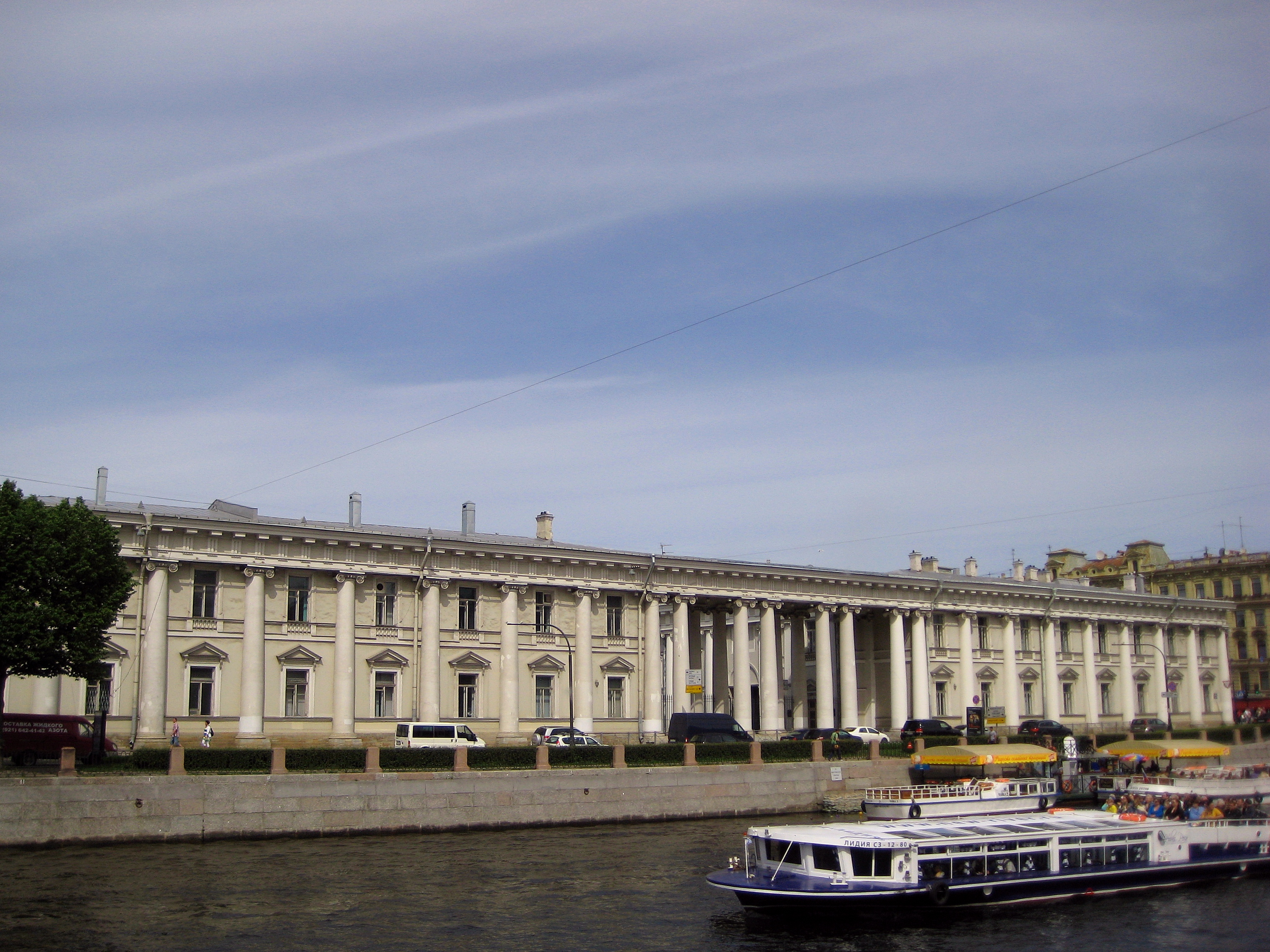

General information
- Location: Saint Petersburg, Russian Empire (now Russia)

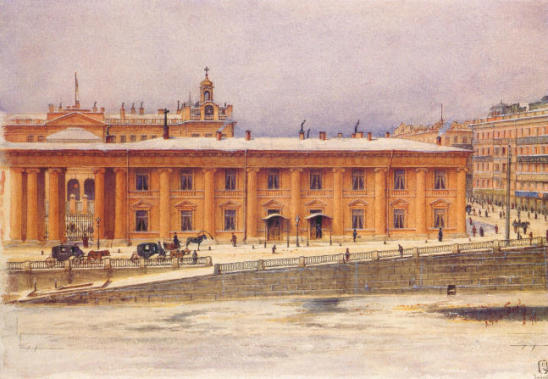
The Cabinet of His Imperial Majesty in 1894. In the background — Anichkov Palace

The Cabinet of His Imperial Majesty, colloquially the Imperial Cabinet was an institution that was in charge of the personal property of the Russian Imperial family and dealt with some other issues in 1704–1917.

== History ==
The Cabinet was established in 1704 by Peter the Great, was the Tsar's Own Office, was in charge of his treasury and property, kept a correspondence. At its head was the cabinet secretary Alexey Makarov. It was closed after the death of Peter, on June 7, 1727.

Anna Ioannovna in 1731 created the highest state body — the Cabinet of Her Majesty, which consisted of three ministers. In 1735 a decree was issued, which the signature of the three cabinet ministers equated to the imperial signature. This body had nothing to do with the Peter's cabinet, except for the name.

Having ascended to the throne, Elizabeth Petrovna began to restore the institutions of her father's time. The Cabinet was restored on December 23, 1741, as the personal office of the Empress; Baron Ivan Cherkasov was appointed manager of its affairs. Among other things, the offices that served the imperial palaces were transferred to the cabinet:

- Imperial Porcelain Factory
- Imperial Glass Factory
- Imperial Tapestry Manufactory
- Peterhof Lapidary Plant
- Peterhof Paper Mill
- Tsarskoye Selo Paper Mill
- Tsarskoye Selo Wallpaper Factory
- Gornoschitsky Marble Factory
- Kiev-Mezhigorsk Faience Factory
- Yekaterinburg Lapidary Factory
- Vyborg Mirror Factory
- Peterhof and Ropshinskaya Paper Mills
- Tivdia Marble Breaking

Catherine the Great singled out from the cabinet office the office of state secretary who was in charge of her own affairs, including appeals and petitions addressed to the empress. With the formation of the Ministry of the Imperial Court in 1826, the cabinet became part of it.

After the February Revolution of 1917, the Provisional Government decided on March 17 to transfer the Cabinet of His Imperial Majesty to the Ministry of Finance, appointing a member of the State Duma, Ivan Titov, to manage its affairs. The Minister of Finance Mikhail Tereshchenko was instructed to clarify the issue of the possible use of available funds of the Cabinet in bonds of an internal military loan.

== Office building ==
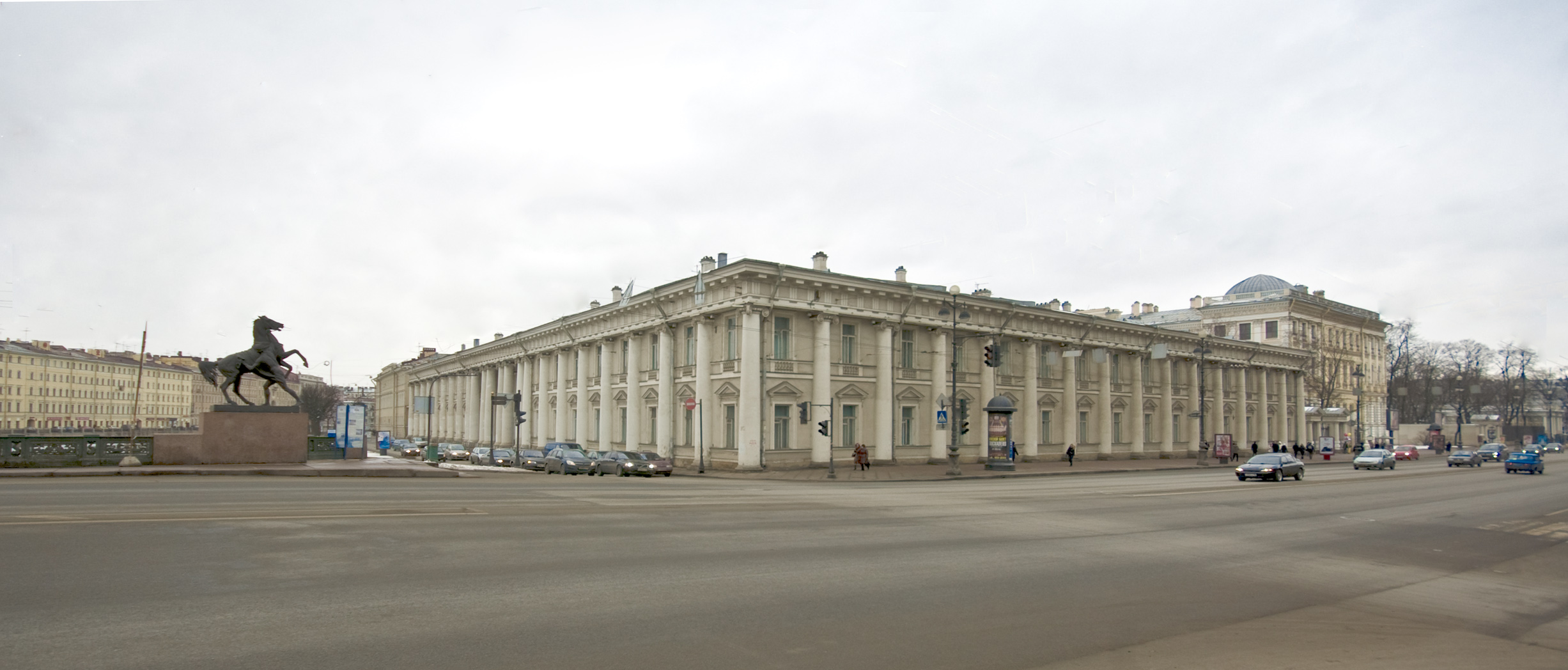
The Cabinet of His Imperial Majesty. Right in the background — Anichkov Palace. In the foreground on the left — part of Anichkov Bridge

During the reign of Alexander I, his office was occupied by the Anichkov Palace at the corner of Nevsky Prospect and Fontanka. His ceremonial courtyard (Nevsky Prospect, 39) was built up in 1803–1809 by two buildings of the mall, which was designed in the style of mature classicism by Giacomo Quarenghi. These two low 2-storey buildings were expanded in 1811 by an extension from the courtyard and transferred to the full authority of the Imperial Cabinet.

Until 1885, the facades of a building with columns of a "giant" Ionic order penetrated wide arcades, through which a view of the Anichkov Palace opened. In 1885, the arcades were laid. From the Fontanka side to this day there is an open colonnade with a driveway into the courtyard. Since 1937 the building housed the Leningrad Palace of Pioneers, now the Saint Petersburg City Palace of Youth Creativity.

== Cabinet lands ==
The Cabinet lands were the property of the imperial family, ruled by the cabinet of his imperial majesty.

The Cabinet lands were concentrated in Altai (from 1747), in Transbaikal (from 1786), in Poland (Łowicz Principality — 3 counties with several dozen estates). In Siberia, the Cabinet lands occupied 67,800,000 hectares. Kabinetskaya street (now — Sovetskaya) in Novosibirsk received its name because of the city’s belonging to the Cabinet. Gold, silver, lead, and copper were mined on the office lands; there were plants for smelting iron, iron, and steel. In 1796, about 70,000 audit souls, exiled convicts, and hired workers were assigned to the Cabinet lands. In the second half of the 18th century, mining enterprises in the Cabinet lands reached a high level of development. In the first half of the 19th century, they could not withstand competition with the developing capitalist industry, were closed or leased. Since 1861, the administration of the Cabinet lands goes over to the enhanced exploitation of forests, leasing land. From 1865, resettlement to Cabinet lands was permitted, and by 1907, up to 1,000,000 peasants were resettled. Office lands in Altai before the October Revolution were given annually from 3 to 4 000 000 rubles of income.

== Collapse of the Russian Empire ==
After the February Revolution of 1917, the Cabinet lands were confiscated, and the cabinet was subordinated to the Ministry of Finance. Eventually, in Soviet Russia, its functions were transferred to the People's Commissariat of Properties.

== Sources ==
- The 200th anniversary of the Cabinet of His Imperial Majesty. 1704-1904
- Overview of the Cabinet of His Imperial Majesty for 1906-1915. 1916.
- State institutions of Russia in the XVIII century. 1960.
- Agapova (1962). The emergence and development of the cabinet economy in Altai in the XVIII century.
- Karpenko, Zinaida (1963). Mining and Metallurgical Industry of Western Siberia in 1700-1860.
- Prokhorov, Alexander (1969–1978). Cabinet of Imperial Majesty // Great Soviet Encyclopedia.
- Троицкий (Troitsky), (С. М.) S. M. "Кабинет его императорского величества (Cabinet of Her Imperial Majesty)". Большой Советской Энциклопедии (Great Soviet Encyclopedia (online)).
- Cabinet of Imperial Majesty
