= Neoclassical architecture in Russia =

Art style

Neoclassical architecture in Russia developed in the second half of the 18th century, especially after Catherine the Great succeeded to the throne on June 28, 1762, becoming Empress of Russia. Neoclassical architecture developed in many Russian cities, first of all St. Petersburg, which was undergoing its transformation into a modern capital throughout the reign of Catherine II.

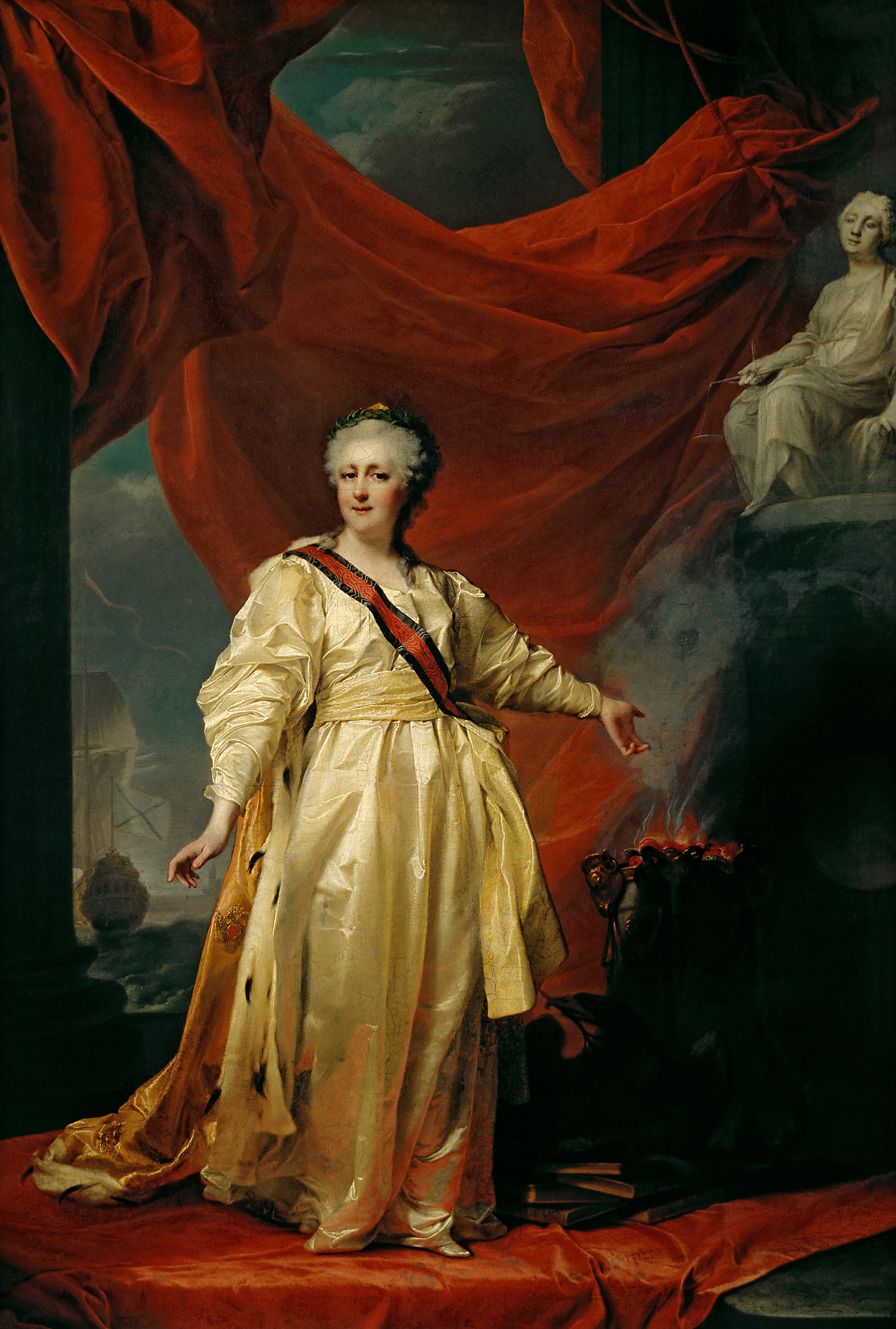
Portrait of Catherine II by Dmitry Levitsky, early 1780s

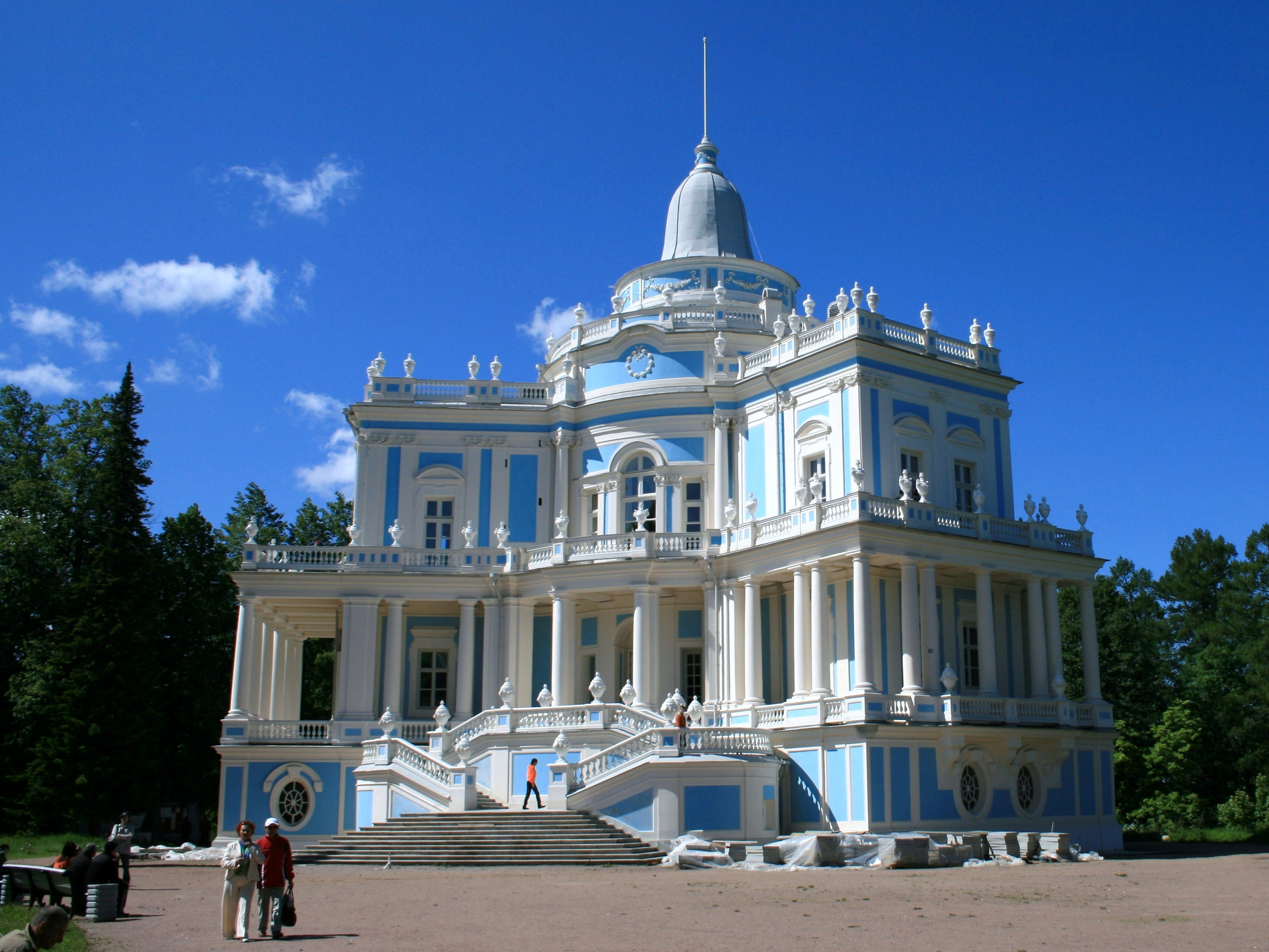
Antonio Rinaldi, the pavilion in Oranienbaum

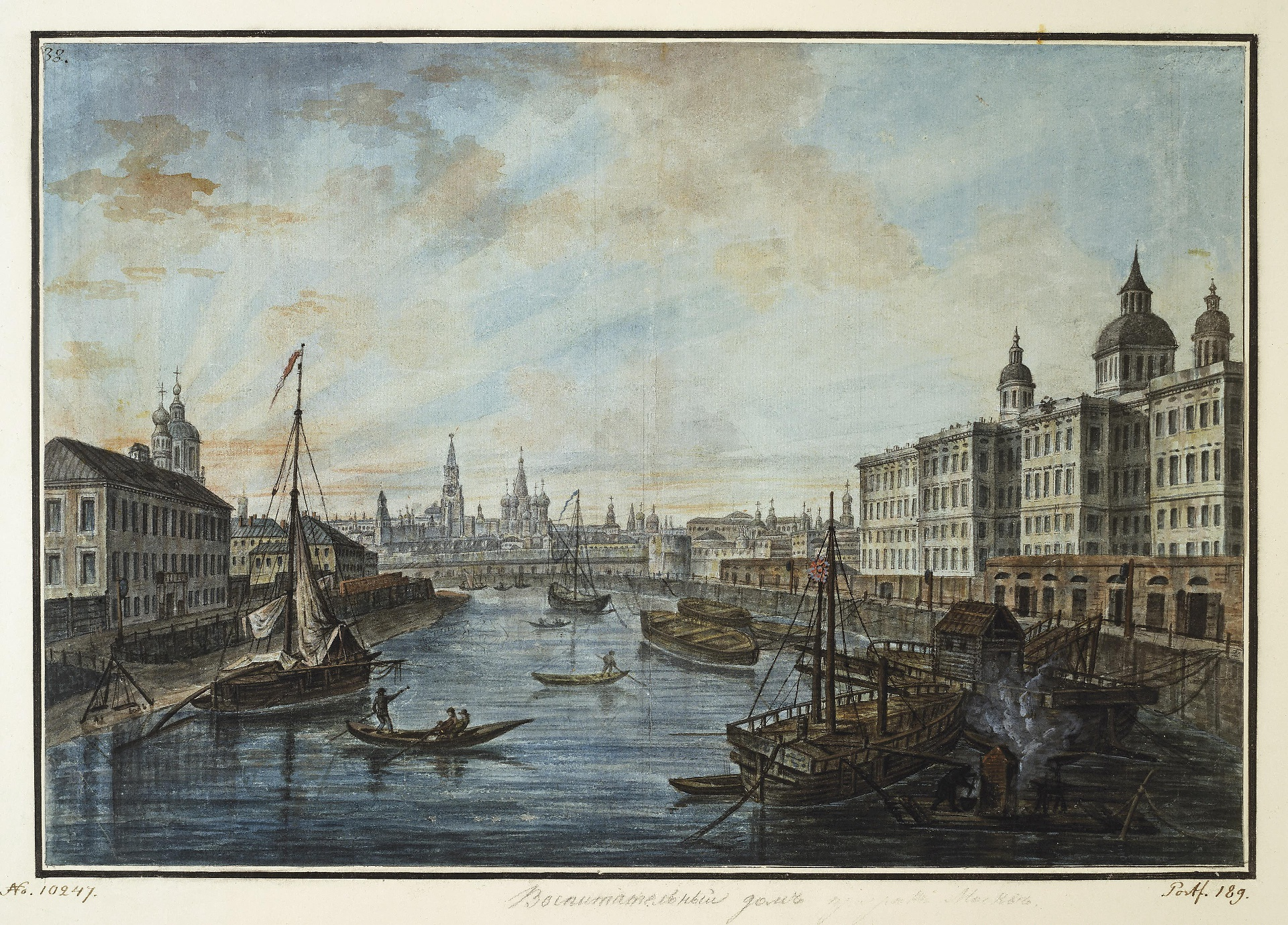
Moscow Orphanage. By Fyodor Alekseyev, early 19th century

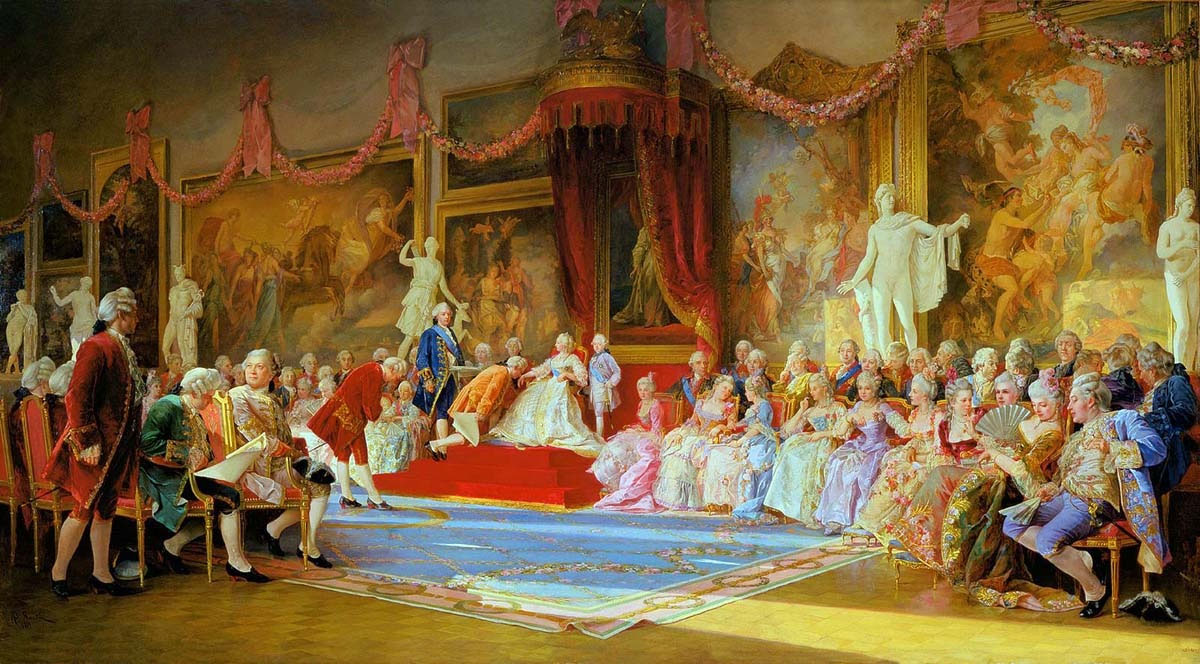
Inauguration of Imperial Academy of Arts by Valery Jacobi, 1889, Louvre

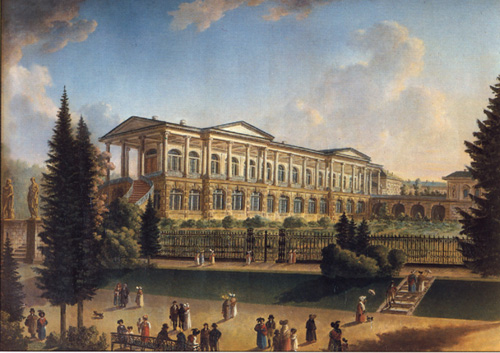
The Cameron Gallery in Tsarskoe Selo

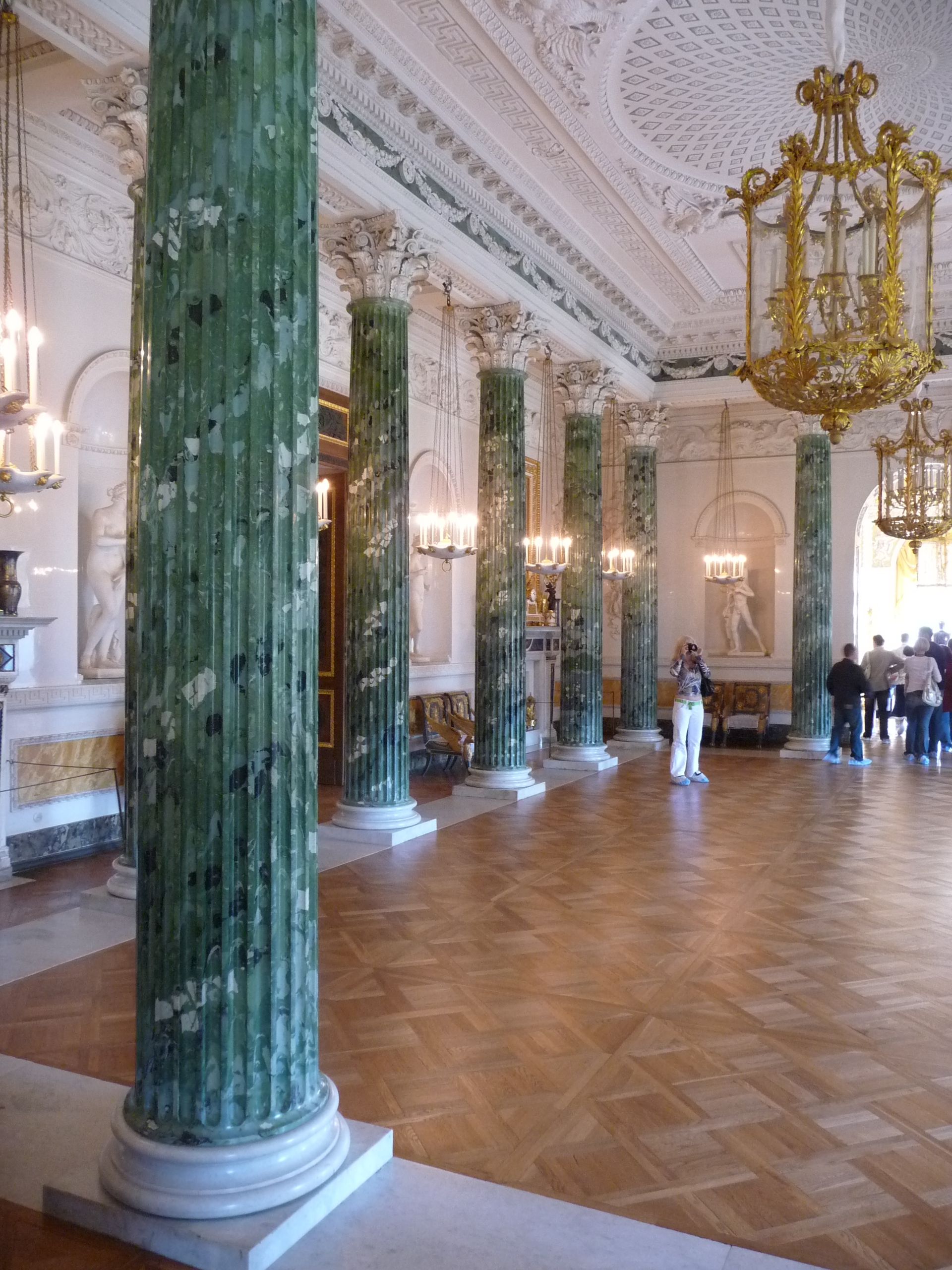
The "Greek Hall" from the Pavlovsk Palace by Vincenzo Brenna (1789)

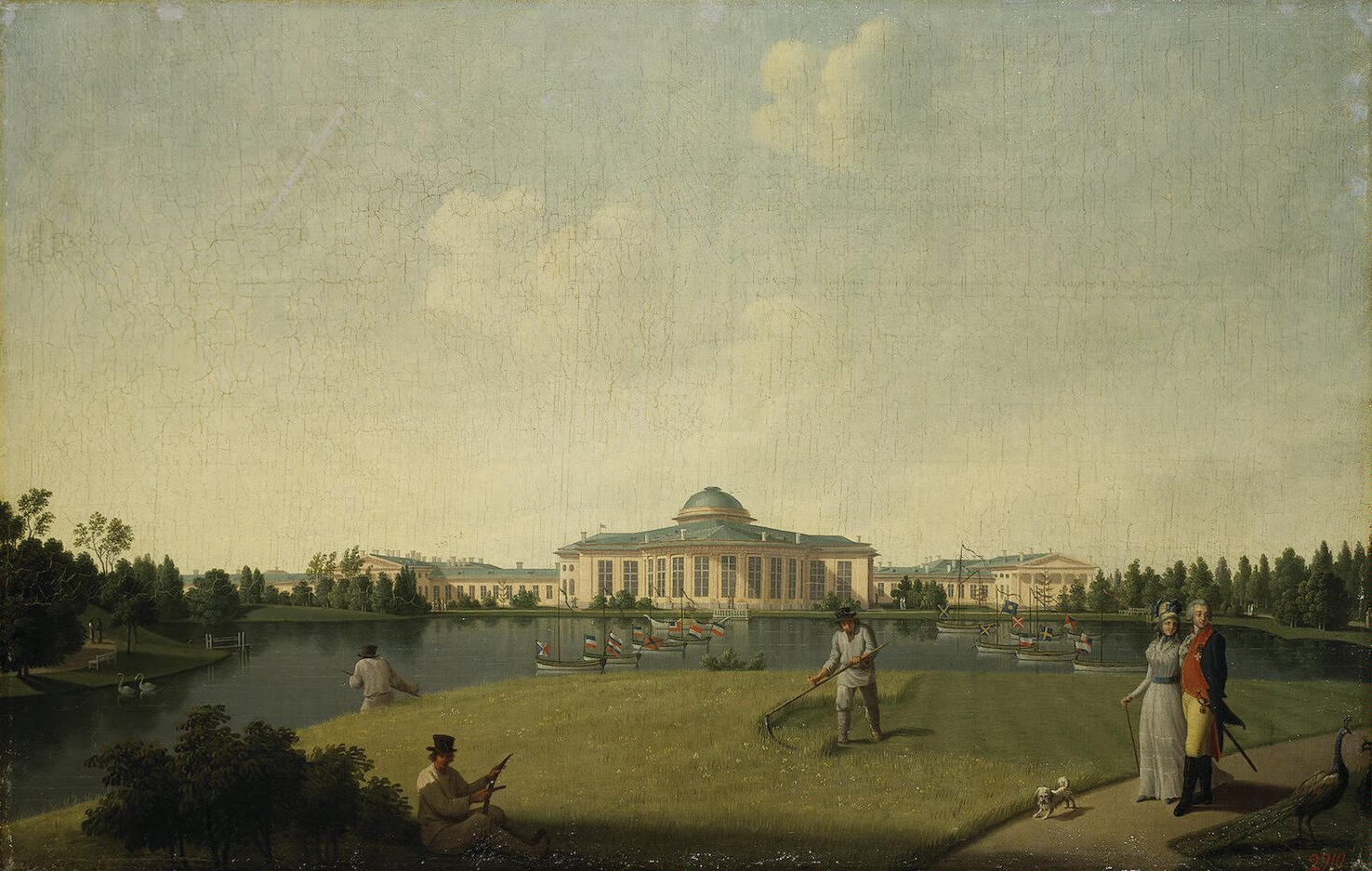
View of the Tauride Palace in a painting by Benjamin Patersen

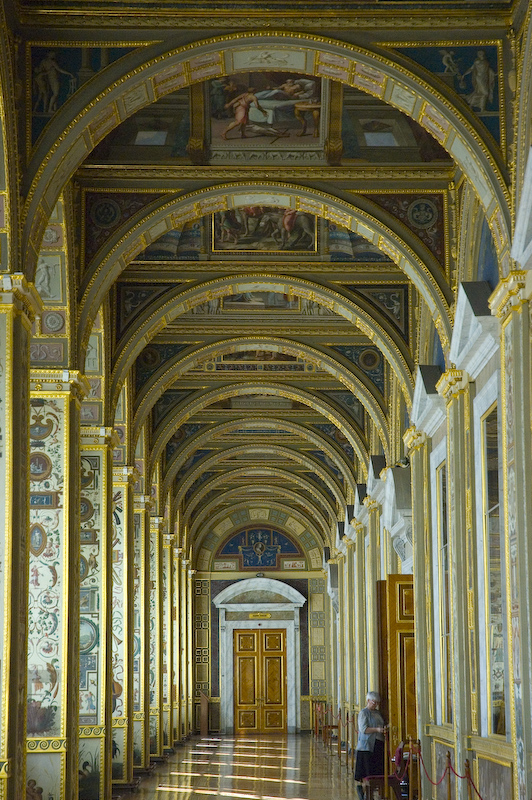
The Raphael's Loggia in the Hermitage Museum by Giacomo Quarenghi, (1787–1792)

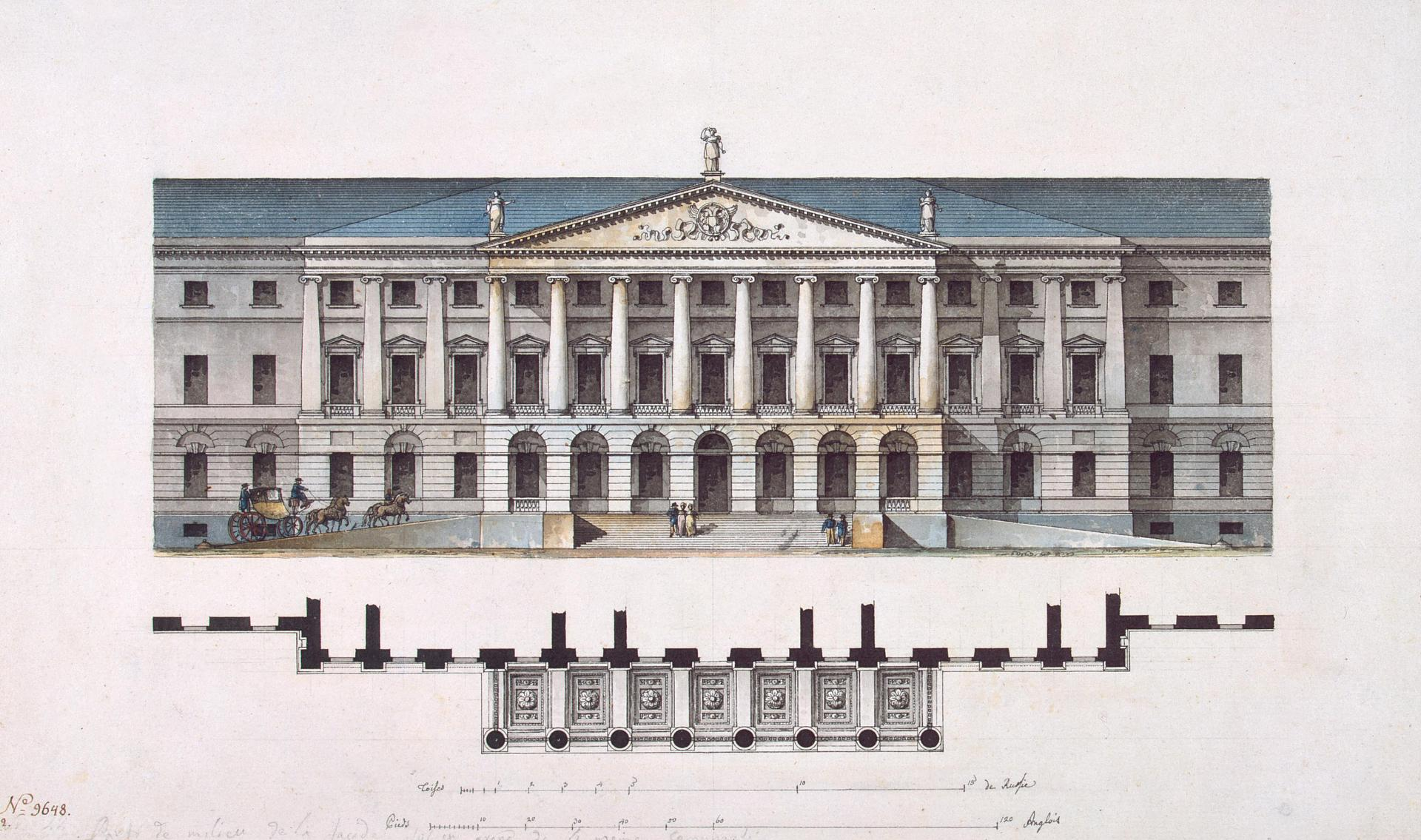
Design for the Smolny Institute in St Petersburg by G. Quarenghi

== Origin of the style ==
=== Background ===
As part of the European cosmopolitan class of the 18th century, Catherine set the tone of Russian social and intellectual life during her long reign. The Catherinian Era was a turning point in terms of the education of nobility, particularly in the fields of art and literature. French became the court language, and along with the language came the ideas of Enlightenment as well. Her embrace of the neo-classicism current linked her capital to ancient Rome, and this phenomenon was particularly encouraged by poetic allusions to St. Petersburg as similar to the ancient city, and the empress as the goddess Minerva. These Roman references must have galvanized her ideas, finally declaring in a letter to Frau Johanna Dorothea Bielcke (1770):

Augustus said that he found Rome built of brick and would leave it built of marble; I say that I found Petersburg virtually wooden and will leave its buildings dressed in marble.

Scholars recognize that, regardless of the motivation, Catherine found in architecture an embodiment for her aspirations, particularly the so-called Greek Project, which aimed to take Istanbul to recreate a new "Christian Byzantium". According to William Brumfield, the neoclassical revival in Russian architecture was an "expression of nostalgia for bygone cultural values, and a reformulated sense of imperial monumentality."

=== The beginnings ===
In 1762, the Empress had ordered the construction of the palace of Oranienbaum, and on that occasion Antonio Rinaldi had built the Chinese Palace (1762–1768) (which presented a mixture of elements of Baroque architecture, of classicism and of traditional Chinese architecture), and the pavilion Katalnaya Gorka (with a rollercoaster) (1762–1774). In this cylindrical pavilion, which had 3 branching wings, a dome and a triumphal arch with a tower ending in a spire, the search for new compositional schemes can be observed. In 1763 Catherine commissioned the French architect Jean-Baptiste Vallin de la Mothe and the Russian Alexander Kokorinov for the construction of the new headquarters of the Academy of Fine Arts in St. Petersburg. In 1766, De La Mothe became the official court architect.

From 1764, the Academy was directed by the philanthropist and councilor for education of Catherine Ivan Betskoy. In those years, the empress and Betskoy, who had been a regular patron of a public education system in Russia, had conceived the ambitious project to build an orphanage in Moscow. This idealistic experiment, inspired by the Enlightenment movement, was aimed at creating the "ideal citizen" through the recovery of thousands of orphans who were to receive an adequate education. The project of the orphanage was given to Karl Blank who, trained at the school of Bartolomeo Rastrelli, was the architect who had built the first neoclassical buildings in Moscow, including said orphanage.

== The 1770s: new impulses ==
In 1773, the Empress wrote a letter to the Academy of France, announcing a contest which asked the architects to design a house in which they were present, at the same time, forms of both Greek and Roman antiquities. Two French academics, Charles de Wailly and Charles-Louis Clérisseau, sent their drawings, but these were not welcomed positively. Hence, in 1778, Catherine said she wanted to hire two Italian architects, since "the Frenchmen we have here know too much and build dreadful houses – because they know too much." In 1779, she commissioned her ministers, Baron Friedrich Melchior and Johann Friedrich Reiffenstein, who at that time were representatives of the Russian Academy of Arts of St. Petersburg in Rome, to find the two architects. The same year, two Italians architects, Giacomo Trombara and Giacomo Quarenghi, arrived at the court of Catherine. Within a few years, neoclassicism in Russia, which in its first phase had drawn ideas from the French architecture of the mid-eighteenth century, turned its attention to the interpretive experiences of the Palladian architecture, especially of England and Italy.

== The 1780s: Giacomo Quarenghi ==
At the invitation of Catherine's agents in 1779, Giacomo Quarenghi arrived in St. Petersburg along with the Scottish architect Charles Cameron. He was a renowned neoclassical architect, having studied in Rome with Anton Raphael Mengs, among other artists and architects who helped shape his interest and expertise in Palladian architecture. Together with Cameron, he first worked on the Catherine Palace located in the Tsarskoye Selo. Specifically, this entailed the construction of a two-story gallery (Cameron's Gallery). Between 1781 and 1796, it was the turn of the palace of Paul I in Pavlovsk which, in its original version, became one of the first examples of Palladian villa built in Russia.

But if Cameron had been successful for the display of his fanciful polychrome, the heirs of Catherine Paul and Maria Feodorovna forced him to absolute sobriety, so at Pavlovsk became prominent the use of white and gold. However, Cameron could not comply to the impositions of the new taste. Between 1786 and 1789 Cameron's duties in Pavlovsk passed to the Italian Vincenzo Brenna, hired by Paul in 1782. In the meantime Quarenghi became the official architect of Catherine II, and between the 1780 and 1785 transformed St. Petersburg into a classical city.

As first assignment, in 1779 Catherine commissioned the architect of Bergamo the task of introducing the neoclassical style in the Peterhof Palace. The intervention was performed in the southwest of the Top Park , where he was made the English Park and in its interior the English Palace, which became the model to which inspire in Russia up to the beginning of 19th century for the villas in the countryside. Between 1782 and 1785 he built the Hermitage Theatre whose interior is inspired by the Teatro Olimpico of Vicenza and for the decorations and the capitals by the ruins of the Theatre of Pompey. Later, between 1787 and 1792, in the Winter Palace Quarenghi had designed and built a place that was the exact replica of the Raphael's Loggia located in the Apostolic Palace in Vatican City, here were then inserted the copies of the drawings of the ceilings. Copies of which were commissioned in 1778 by the Empress to von Grimm who, through Reiffenstein, did reproduce in Rome copies of life-sized vault; the encaustic paintings were made by Christoforo Unterperger.

In 1783, Quarenghi designed the Palace of the State Bank on the Griboyedov Canal, given the importance of the building, the author gives the monument a majestic appearance. Different was the architect's attitude in the most sober Academy of Sciences (1783–1789) where the outside, unadorned, is marked by a heavy porch in Ionic order and in the inside the elegant proportions and the solemnity of the spaces remind the taste of ancient Rome. In those years Quarenghi was also busy, after the interventions of the Russian architect Karl Blank and Francesco Camporesi, to complete the Catherine Palace in Moscow (1790–1797). Quarenghi had built numerous palaces and brought into vogue an original monumental style, of Palladian inspiration, which was a reference for many architects who worked in Russia, among them Ivan Starov that, for the Prince Potemkin, created the Tauride Palace. The building, consisting of a main building and two adjoining wings complemented by side pavilions, in perfect adherence to the Palladian villa type, served as a model for innumerable manors scattered across the Russian Empire. Nikolay Lvov's architecture represented the second, "strict" generation of neoclassicism stylistically close to Giacomo Quarenghi. The polymath architect, among other things, had translated into Russian the treatise I quattro libri dell'architettura by Palladio.

== The period of Paul I (1796–1801) ==
Catherine the Great died in 1796, and her son Paul became Emperor; but he had shown signs of mental instability, and it did not last long. His reforms had limited the rights of the nobility, and in 1801 he was assassinated by a group of conspirators, including his son Crown Prince Alexander. The most significant innovation was the change of taste of which the best example has been reflected in the care of the interior of the Pavlovsk Palace, that the sovereign had chosen as a dwelling. The emperor's wife Maria Feodorovna had tried to introduce into his home the refinements she had known in her visit to France in 1782.

== Redevelopment post the Moscow Fire of 1812 ==
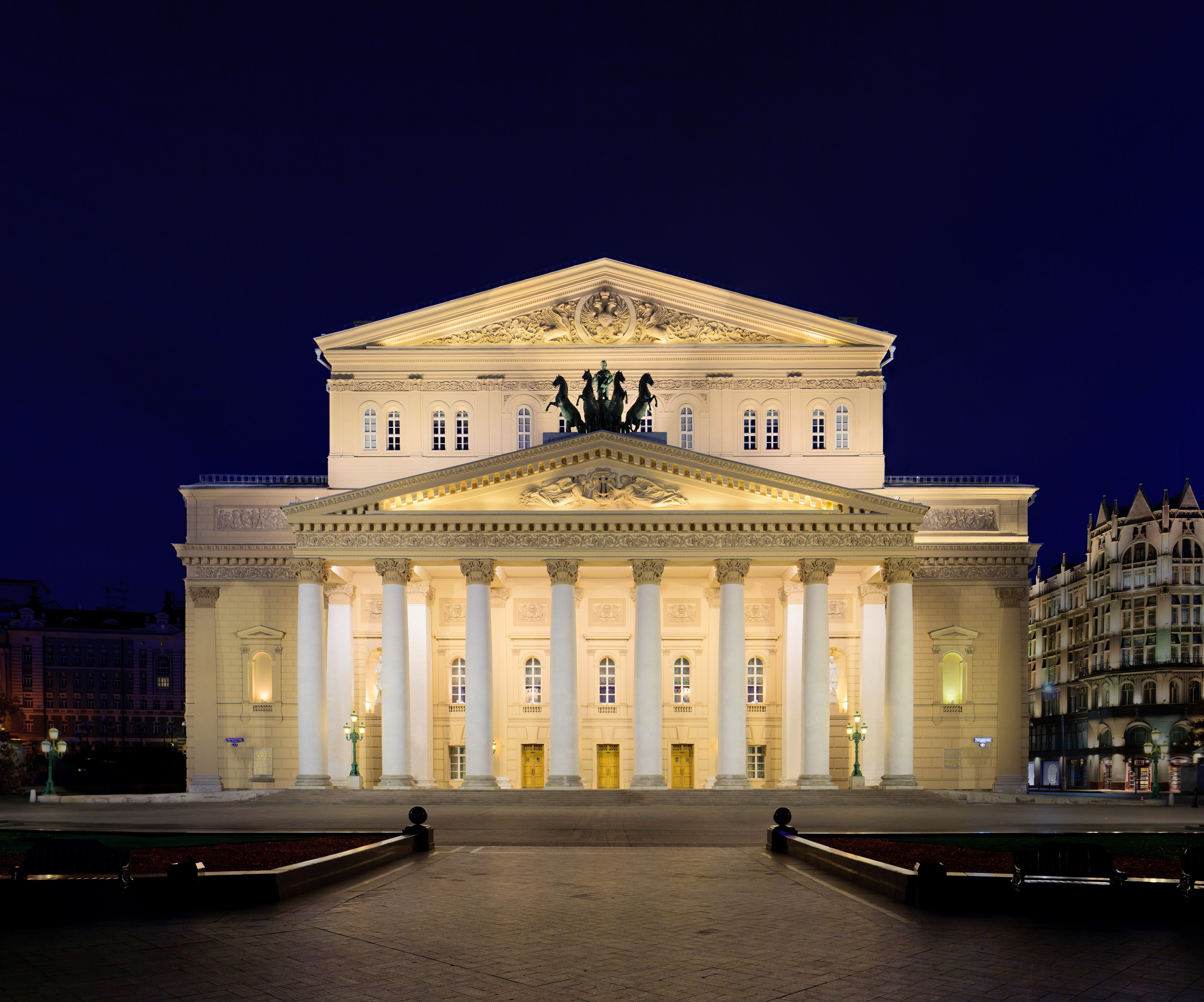
The Bolshoi Theatre, taken 2011

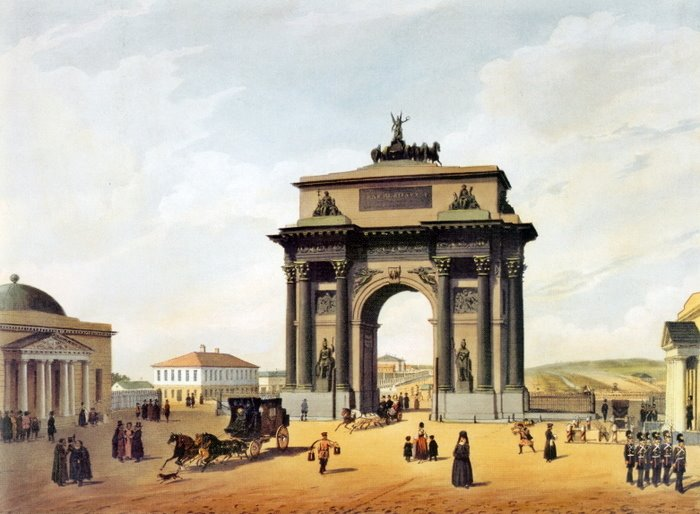
Triumphal Gate on Tverskaya Zastava Square, painted 1848

Much of central Moscow was destroyed by fire during the French invasion of 1812. In subsequent decades much of the city was rebuilt in the neoclassical style, under the supervision of Italian-Russian architects such as Joseph Bové, and Alberto Cavos, under military governors Alexander Tormasov (1814–1819) and Dmitry Golitsyn (1820–ca 1840).

== Bibliography ==
- Dmitry Shvidkovsky, Russian Architecture and the West, New Haven (Connecticut), Yale University Press, 2007
- Mario Praz, Gusto neoclassico, Rizzoli, Milano, 1974 ISBN 88-17-10058-7
- Lionel Kochan, The Making of Modern Russia, London, 1962
- Howard Colvin, A Biographical Dictionary of British Architects, 1600–1840, 1958; IV edition, Yale University Press, 2008, ISBN 978-0-300-12508-5
- Emil Kaufmann, Architecture in the Age of Reason – Baroque and Postbaroque in England, Italy, and France, 1955, Harvard University Press, ISBN 9780674182288
