= Ivan Titov =

Priest and deputy of the Third and Fourth State Dumas from the Perm Governorate

Ivan Vasilievich Titov
- Иван Васильевич Титов
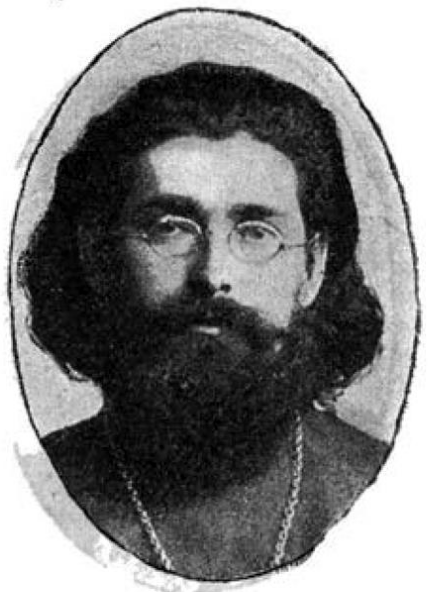
- Ivan Titov (1907)

1st Deputy of the 3rd State Duma
- In office 1 November 1907 – 9 June 1912
- Monarch: Nicholas II

1st Deputy of the 4th State Duma
- In office 20 November 1912 – 6 October 1917
- Monarch: Nicholas II / monarchy abolished

Personal details
- Born: 18 February 1879 Russian Empire, Perm Governorate
- Died: 18 October 1948 (aged 69) France, Paris
- Citizenship: Russian Empire; Russian Soviet Federative Socialist Republic
- Party: Progressive (1907–17); Radical Democrat (1917)
- Education: Theological Seminary, University
- Profession: Priest, politician
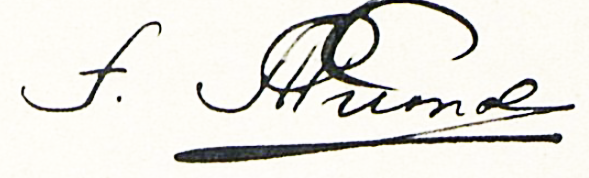
- Signature

Ivan (Ioann) Vasilievich Titov (Russian: Ива́н (Иоа́нн) Васи́льевич Тито́в; 18 February 1879, Perm Governorate – 18 October 1948, Paris) was a priest, deputy of the Third and Fourth State Dumas from the Perm Governorate (1907–1917), and a candidate for delegate to the Constituent Assembly (1917).

== Biography ==
=== Early years ===
Ivan (Ioann) Titov was born on 18 February (or March), 1879, at the Nikolaev plant of Osinsky Uyezd (Perm Governorate) into the family of a clergyman. After graduating from the Perm Theological Seminary in 1901, he began church service: he was ordained a priest, and on 15 August 1901 he received a parish in Kungur ("ordained a priest to the church"; with an annual income of about 1 thousand rubles for 1907).

In addition, during this period Titov led the Kungur church school and was the law teacher in the primary schools of the city. He also worked in an educational society. He was a homeowner. With the participation of Ivan Titov, a two-story stone building was built for a two-year school.

For the telegram sent to Emperor Nicholas II with a request to mitigate the fate of the technicians sentenced to death, Titov was during the election campaign "under the ban" (forbidden in priesthood); went beyond the state of the diocese.

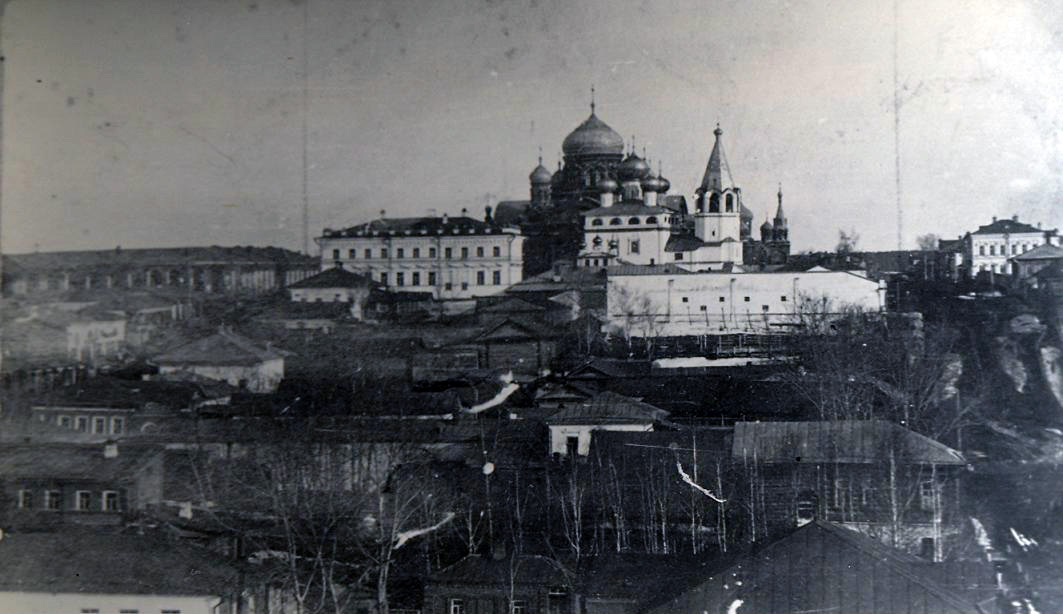
Kungur at the beginning of the 20th century

=== Member of the Third Duma. Removal of a dignity ===
On 14 October 1907 Ivan Vasilievich Titov was elected to the State Duma of the Russian Empire of the third convocation from the total electors of the Perm Provincial Electoral Assembly. In the Duma, he joined the Faction of the Progressists and Peacekeepers, became its secretary. Due to "some deafness in the left ear", he asked to allocate a place closer to the Duma tribune.

In the 3rd Duma, Titov was a member of a number of Duma commissions: on affairs of the Orthodox Church (in the fifth session he became a friend of its chairman), on gymnasiums and preparatory schools (from the fourth session – secretary), on public education, budget, on the charter and staff of universities. Titov's signature is under the draft laws "On Changing Laws on the Collection and Administration of Zemstvo and Natural Duties of Peasants", "On Improving and Increasing Peasant Land Tenure and Land Use", "On Introducing Zemstvo in Siberia", "Rules for Admission to Higher Educational Institutions" and "On Abolition of the Death Penalty". He also served as a rapporteur for the Conciliation Commission on the bill on the abolition of restrictions related to the deprivation or voluntary removal of the dignity or rank.

During the work of the Third Duma, Ivan Titov spoke 29 times in the debate, mainly on public education: in particular, he advocated the introduction of universal primary education.

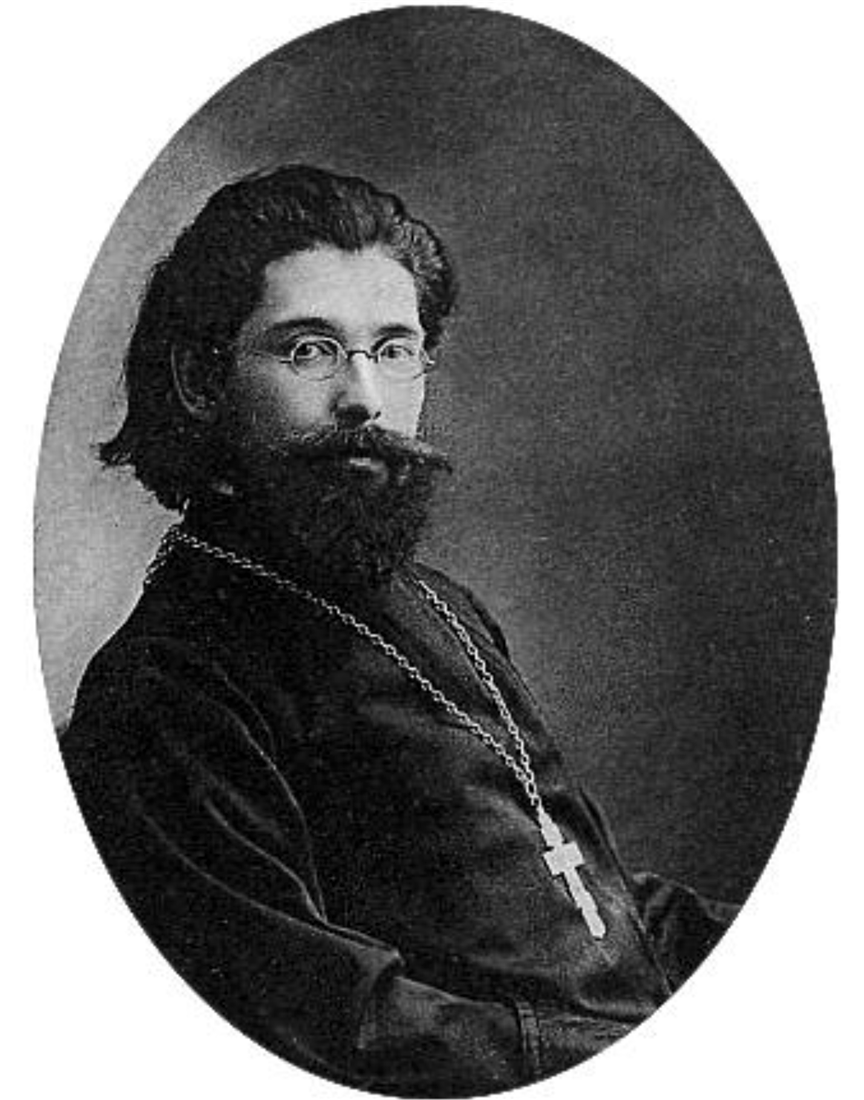
Ivan Titov (1910)

As a deputy, in 1912, Titov turned to the Most Holy Governing Synod with a request to allow him to go to university. Having been refused, he declared voluntary abdication of dignity and entered the University of Saint Petersburg. Dignity was removed on August 2 – without due admonition. After this, Titov enrolled in the Kungur bourgeoisie, became a personal honorary citizen. Finished university.

=== Member of the 4th Duma ===
On 20 October 1912 Ivan Vasilievich was elected to the Fourth Duma from the second congress of city voters. He rejoined the progressive faction, and from August 1915 he re-became its secretary. Titov also became a member of the Council of Elders of the Duma. In the new convocation, he was a member of a number of commissions: budgetary, on the continuity of legislative work of the Third Duma, on public education (from the first session – secretary), on affairs of the Orthodox Church, personnel, on meetings, financial, on trade and industry, on the press. Prepared a report on projects related to the gold mining industry for the financial commission.

In addition, Ivan Titov was a rapporteur of the 11th department of the Duma, as well as the commission for the execution of the state list of income and expenses, the budget commission and the commission for public education. Together with his faction, Titov became a member of the Progressive Bloc in August 1915. On 31 October 1916 he left this block (also with the faction).

Titov spoke 12 times as a rapporteur for various Duma commissions; in the debate he now spoke only 10 times. As in the Third Duma, he received only one comment for violating the Duma regulations, but in the Fourth Duma he more often interrupted the speakers with his "exclamations" – more than 20 times against the only exclamation for the entire period of the previous Duma.

During the First World War, Ivan Vasilievich was elected a member of the Special Meeting on the provision of fuel to railway lines, state and public institutions and enterprises working for state defense purposes, but refused this work. He attended the meetings of the Masonic Inter-Parliamentary Union.

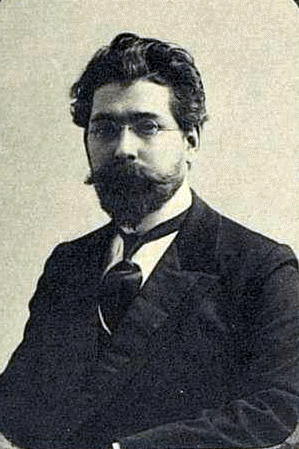
Ivan Titov (1913)

=== Commissioner ===
In 1917, Titov was a participant in the February Revolution. On 28 February the Provisional Committee of the State Duma appointed him commissioner to the Ministry of Finance, where on 1 March he set the agency the task of restoring work "in normal order". On 2 March Ivan Titov held a meeting with representatives of banks, at which the latter announced their complete subordination to the Provisional Committee of the State Duma and their readiness to render full assistance to the Committee. Then it was also decided to open all the banks of Russia.

On 4 March, at a meeting of the Provisional Government, Titov was appointed head of the Cabinet of His Imperial Majesty, previously transferred to the Ministry of Finance. He received the authority of the Commissioner of the Provisional Government to examine the economic part of the former Ministry of the Imperial Court and Allotments.

After that, on 22 March, Titov was sent to the Perm Governorate and the Ural factories area as commissar of the Provisional Committee of the State Duma and the Provisional Government. On 8 April, upon his return to Petrograd, he was sent to the area of the Fort "Ino" (Nikolaev) of the Kronstadt Fortress "for communication with the troops and the population".

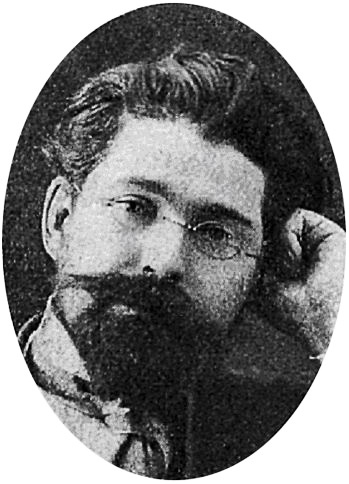
Ivan Titov after 1912

On 21 April 1917 Ivan Titov became Commissioner of the Provisional Government and the Provisional Committee of the State Duma in the 6th Army of the Romanian Front. On May 6, at a meeting of the Provisional Committee, he was appointed a permanent member with a casting vote in the Committee of State Savings Banks.

From the end of March – beginning of April, Titov joined the Russian Radical Democratic Party and in April became a member of its Central Committee. In addition, he became one of the leaders of the Perm department of the party. He ran on the list of the Russian Radical Democratic Party in the All-Russian Constituent Assembly, but was not elected. While living in Petrograd, he edited the political newspaper of the "left direction".

=== Emigration ===
After the Bolshevik Coup in October 1917, Titov emigrated to Turkey (Constantinople), where he was a member of the Russian parliamentary committee. Then he moved to France (1920). In 1922, Ivan Vasilievich was the director of the Russian Bank of Paris. In exile, Titov became a freemason: in the early 1920s he was a visitor to the Astrea lodge in Paris. In addition, he organized a choir in the French capital, with which he successfully performed concerts.

During the Second World War, Ivan Vasilievich was left without a permanent job: on 4 March 1943 he was admitted to the Russian House as the second psalmist of the local Nicholas Church. Titov asked Metropolitan Eulogius (Georgievsky) to be reinstated in the priesthood, but he was refused. By the decision of Metropolitan Seraphim (Lukyanov), he was nevertheless restored to the dignity. From 14 April 1943 Titov nurtured the Russian church community in Nancy. After the death of Metropolitan Eulogius in 1946, he passed into the jurisdiction of the Moscow Patriarchate.

In 1946–1948, Ivan Vasilievich Titov was the second assistant to the abbot of the Nicholas Church in Sainte-Geneviève-des-Bois in the suburbs of Paris, where he died on 18 October 1948. The priest rank sang a funeral song to him during the funeral.

== Family ==
He was married, two daughters (in 1907).

== Sources ==
- Russian State Historical Archive. Fund 1278, Inventory 9, Case 796, 797; Inventory 10. Case 6, 7, 28
- Members of the State Duma (Portraits and Biographies). The Third Convocation. 1907–1912 / Compiled by M. M. Boyovich. Moscow, 1909. Page 234
- Members of the State Duma (Portraits and Biographies). The Fourth Convocation. 1912–1917 / Compiled by M. M. Boyovich. Moscow, 1913. Page 234
- Evgeny Shumilov. State, Political, Public Figures of the Perm Province (1905–1919). Perm, 2005. Page 60
- Fourth State Duma: Portraits and Biographies. Saint Petersburg, 1913
- 4th Convocation of the State Duma: Art Phototypic Album With Portraits and Biographies. Saint Petersburg, 1913
- Andrey Nikolaev. Commissioners of the Provisional Committee of the State Duma (February – March 1917): Personnel // From the Depths of Time. Saint Petersburg, 1995. No. 5
- Andrey Nikolaev. Commissioners of the Provisional Committee of the State Duma in April 1917: Personnel // From the Depths of Time. Saint Petersburg, 1997. No. 8
- Andrey Serkov. Russian Freemasonry, 1731–2000: Encyclopedic Dictionary. Moscow, 2001
- A Track Record of the Father of Ivan Titov (1943–1946). Archives of the Diocesan Administration of the Western European Russian Exarchate–Archdiocese of the Patriarchate of Constantinople
- State Archive of the Russian Federation. Fund 6991. Committee on Religious Affairs of the Council of Ministers of the Soviet Union. Inventory 1. Case 274. Materials on the Orthodox Church in France in 1947
- Vladimir Rozhkov, Church Issues in the State Duma. Rome, 1975 (2nd Edition, Moscow, 2004)
- Igor Kiryanov. Perm Deputies of the State Duma. Perm, 2006, Page 67
- Nivier Antoine. Orthodox Clergy, Theologians and Church Leaders of the Russian Emigration in Western and Central Europe. 1920–1995: Biographical Reference Book / Moscow: Russian Way; Paris: YMCA-Press, 2007, Pages 483–484
