= English Palace =

Palace in Russia

Coordinates: 59.880922°N 29.88158°E

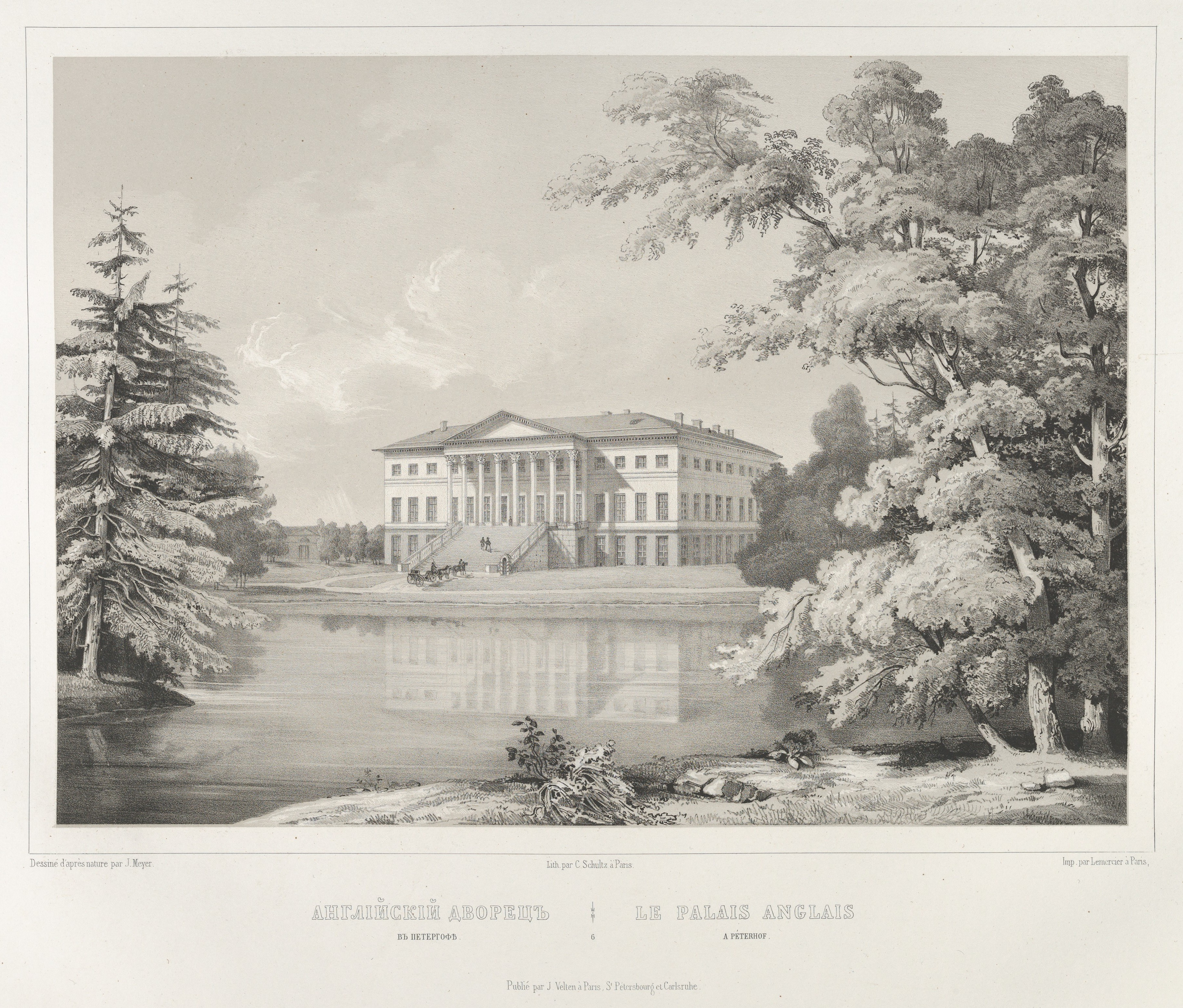
The English Palace in the 19th century

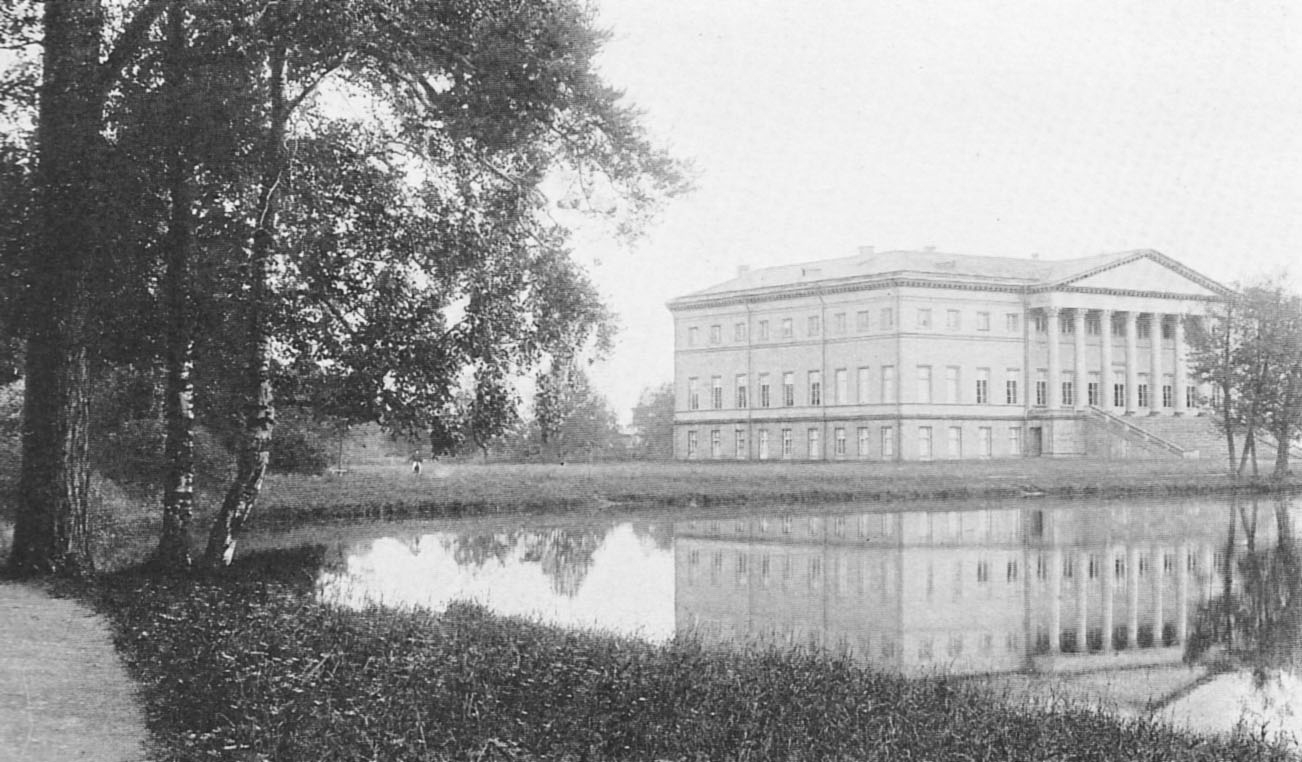
The English Palace in 1900

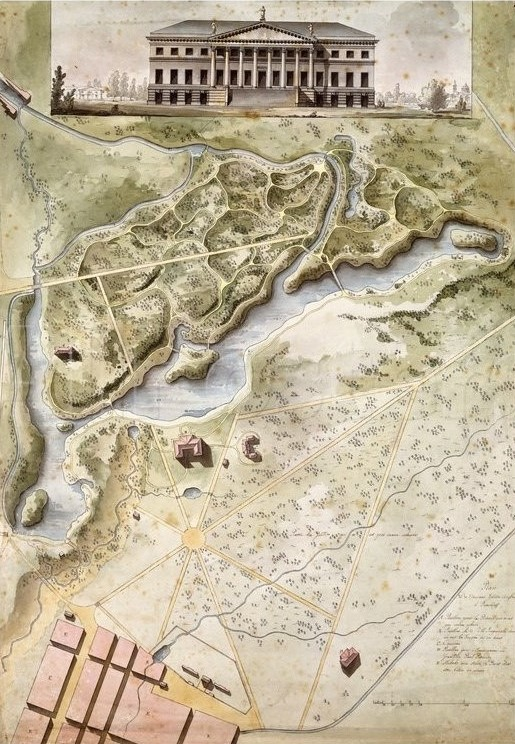
Design of the English Palace and Park by Qiacomo Quarenghi

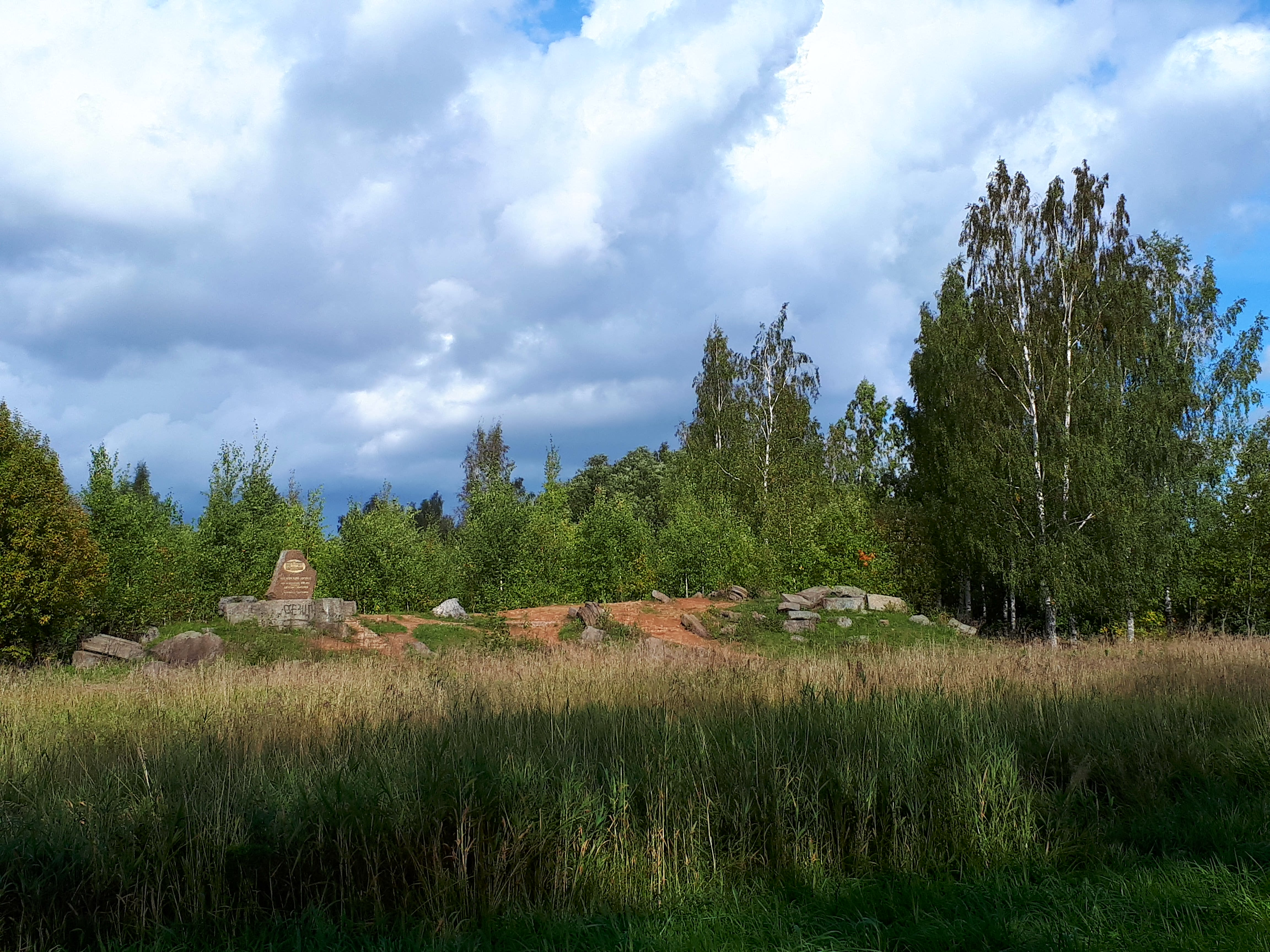
The palace ruins today

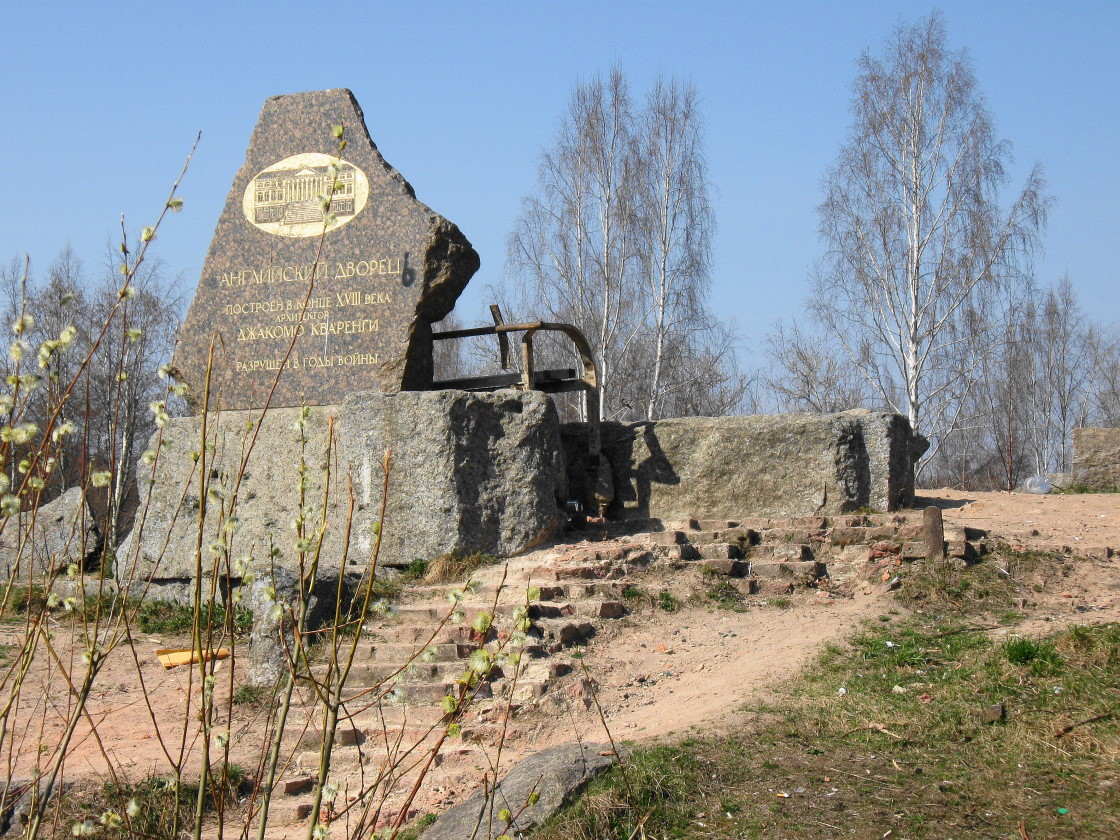
The monument placed on the palace ruins

The English Palace (Russian: Английский дворец) was a neoclassical palace within the Peterhof Palace complex in Petergof, Russia. Sometimes, it is also named the New Peterhof palace (Russian: Новый Петергофский дворец). It was Giacomo Quarenghi’s first important commission in Russia, a magnificent rectangular edifice with a Corinthian portico in Palladian style. The palace, commissioned by empress Catherine II the Great and completed in 1794, was damaged by the Germany army during World War II and was later demolished by the Soviet government.

== History ==
The English Palace was a palace in the south of the Peter Palace complex. It was commissioned by empress Catherine II (1729-1796), and designed by the Italian architect Giacomo Quarenghi (1744-1817). Construction started in 1781 and was completed in 1794. Delays came from the delivery of heavy granite blocks to the shallow Peterhof harbour, changes in the design, and shortage of funds due to the war with Turkey.

Its name relates to its location in the English park, which was created at the same time by the gardener James Meader. The garden was designed in English landscape style, which was in the fashion at that time.

The palace was Quarenghi's first building in Russia. For the design, he drew inspiration from the composition of Prior Park, near Bath, which was built by John Wood for Ralph Allen in the 1730s and 1740s, and Wanstead House. Like some of his later designs, the palace is distinguished by a precise layout, simplicity and chastity of composition, and monumentality of forms, which was achieved by creating imposing slightly massive proportions and using colonnades to smooth wall plans. The main entrance was accentuated by a wide granite staircase leading to the mezzanine and an eight-column portico of the Corinthian order with a triangular pediment. The western façade had a loggia with six columns. The ground floor was lined with granite.

Within the English Palace, Empress Catherine II hoped to seclude herself from the bustle of court life. During the reign of her successor, Paul I (1754-1801), the palace suffered the same fate as other newly constructed royal residences by his mother, who resented: it was turned into barracks, like the Catherine Palace in Moscow. Later during the reign of Alexander I (1777-1825), under direct supervision of Quarenghi, the palace was thoroughly renovated between 1802 and 1805. At the same time, the interior decoration was completed in classical style.

Until the start of the World War I, the palace was used as a guesthouse for foreign diplomats and other high-ranking guests, who were attending summer receptions at the Peterhof grand palace. In addition, the palace served as an art gallery with a collection primarily consisting of portraits of European monarchs. From time to time, public events were held at the palace, such exhibitions, charity balls or concerts (e.g. Anton Rubinstein (1829-1894) on 14 July 1885).

After the Russian Revolution in 1917, the palace was used as a sanatorium. During World War II, the palace was destroyed in 1942, due to its position on the front line. After the war, the Soviet government decided not to restore the palace and blew it up with dynamite. The cellars and the basement of the building have partially been preserved. A monument has been placed on the palace ruins.

== Bibliography ==
- Cross, Anthony (1991). "Russian Gardens, British Gardeners". Garden History. 19 (Spring 1991). The Gardens Trust: 12–20.
- Shvidkovsky, Dmitri (1996). The Empress & the Architect: British Architecture and Gardens at the Court of Catherine the Great. London: Yale University Press. p. 1996. ISBN 9780300065640.
- Koehler, Marcus (2018). "'Dam You Botany': James Meader, Gardener to the Russian Court at Peterhof". Garden History. 46 (Summer 2018). The Gardens Trust: 97–107.
