= Giacomo Quarenghi =

Italian architect (1744–1817)

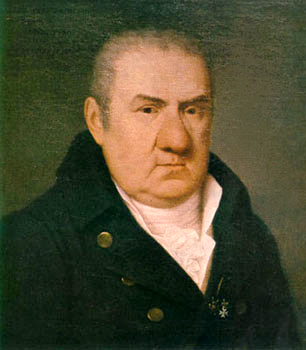
1811 portrait by Giuseppe Poli

Giacomo Quarenghi (Italian pronunciation: [ˈdʒaːkomo kwaˈreŋɡi, -ˈrɛŋɡi]; Russian: Джа́комо Кваре́нги, romanized: Dzhakomo Kvarengi, IPA: [ˈdʐakəmə kvɐˈrʲenɡʲɪ]; 20 or 21 September 1744 – 2 March [O.S. 18 February] 1817) was an Italian architect who was the foremost and most prolific practitioner of neoclassical architecture in Imperial Russia, particularly in Saint Petersburg. He brought into vogue an original monumental style, of Palladian inspiration, which was a reference for many architects who worked in Russia, including in the Grand Duchy of Finland.

He has been described as "the last of the great architects of Italy".

== Career in Italy ==
Born in Rota d'Imagna near Bergamo to an Italian noble family, Quarenghi was destined by his parents for a career in law or the church but initially was allowed to study painting in the Bergamo studio of G. Reggi, himself a student of Tiepolo. Young Quarenghi was well-educated and widely read. Travelling through Italy he visited Vicenza, Verona, Mantua and Venice. He made drawings of the Greek temples at Paestum (Loukomski 1928) and arrived in Rome in 1763, at a moment when Neoclassicism was being developed in advanced artistic circles. He studied painting with Anton Raphael Mengs, then with Stefano Pozzi, later moving to study architecture (1767–69) with a traditionalist Late Baroque architect Paolo Posi.

Then he came upon a copy of Andrea Palladio's Quattro Libri d'archittetura. "You could never believe," he wrote to his friend and long-term correspondent Marchesi, "the impression that this book made. Then it struck me that I had every reason to consider myself badly guided" before that point (Loukomsky 1928). He turned for new, Neoclassical instruction to Antoine Decrezet, a friend of Winckelmann, and the former's pupil Niccola Giansimoni, measuring and drawing the antiquities of Rome.

In Venice (1771–1772), where he was studying the works of Palladio, Quarenghi came into contact with a British lord passing through there on the Grand Tour. It was through him that the architect secured a few minor English commissions, such as garden pavilions, chimney pieces (Loukomsky 1928), and an altar for the private Roman Catholic chapel of Henry Arundell at New Wardour Castle. Designs for a country house for Lord Whitworth were exhibited at Venice in 1967. His first major commission (1771–7) was the internal reconstruction of the monastery of Santa Scholastica at Subiaco. For the Venetian cardinal Rezzonico, the nephew of Pope Clement XIII, he designed a decor for a Music Room in the Campidoglio, and designs for Clement's tomb (later executed by Antonio Canova).

His work in Italy and for English clients formed enough of a reputation that in 1779 he was selected by the Prussian-born count Rieffenstein, who had been commissioned by Catherine II of Russia to send her two Italian architects to replace her French ones (Loukomsky 1928). Despite having just designed a manege in Monaco and a dining hall for the Archduchess of Modena, 35-year-old Quarenghi seems to have felt himself underemployed, given the number of architects then working in Italy and the dearth of commissions from the church and nobility. He accepted Rieffenstein's offer without hesitation and left with his pregnant wife for St Petersburg.

== Career under Catherine II ==
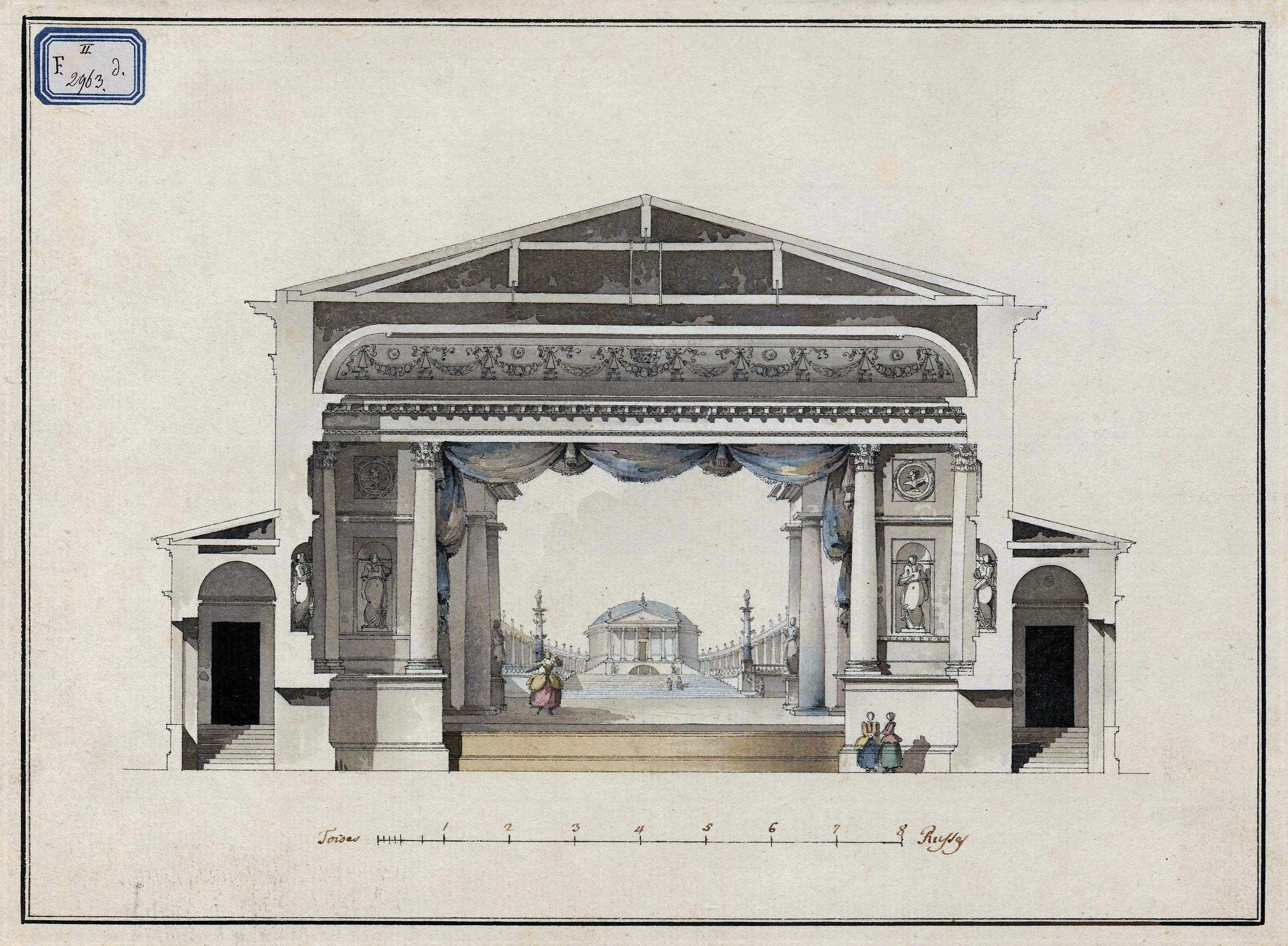
Quarenghi's Hermitage Theatre in St Petersburg: original drawing in the National Museum in Warsaw

Quarenghi's first commission in Russia was the English Palace in Peterhof, commissioned by Empress Catherine II; a magnificent rectangular edifice with a Corinthian portico, it was under construction from 1781 to 1794. It was damaged by the Germans during World War II and was later demolished by the Soviet government.

In 1783 Quarenghi settled with his family in Tsarskoe Selo, where he would supervise the construction of the Alexander Palace, the most ambitious of his undertakings to date. Appointed to the post of Catherine's court architect, Quarenghi went on to produce many designs for the Empress, her successors and members of her court: houses, summerhouses, bridges, theatres, hospices, a market, a bank building, interior decorations and garden designs. His projects were put into execution as far away from the capital as Novhorod-Siverskyi, Ukraine, where a cathedral he designed was erected.

In Moscow, he was responsible for the reconstruction of medieval Red Square in a fashionable neo-Palladian mode. Count Nicholas Sheremetev engaged him to devise a theatre hall in the Ostankino Palace and a semicircular colonnade for the Sheremetev Hospital. Most of Quarenghi's designs intended for Moscow were subsequently realized with significant modifications by other architects, as was the case with Gostiny Dvor (1789–1805), Catherine Palace (1782–87), and Sloboda Palace (1790–94).

== Career under Paul and Alexander I ==
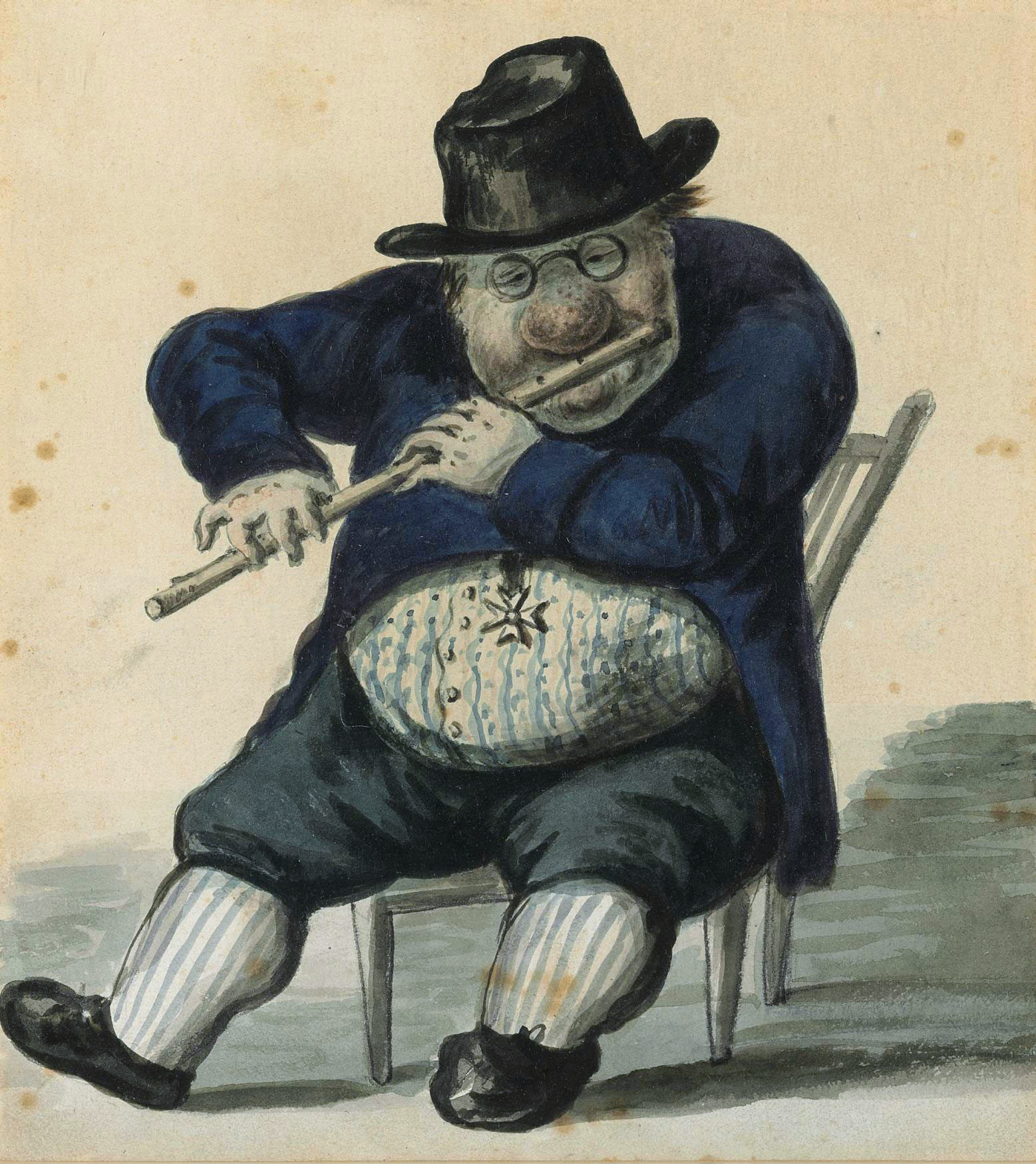
Caricature of Giacomo Quarenghi wearing the Order of the Knights of Malta, by his friend Aleksander Orłowski

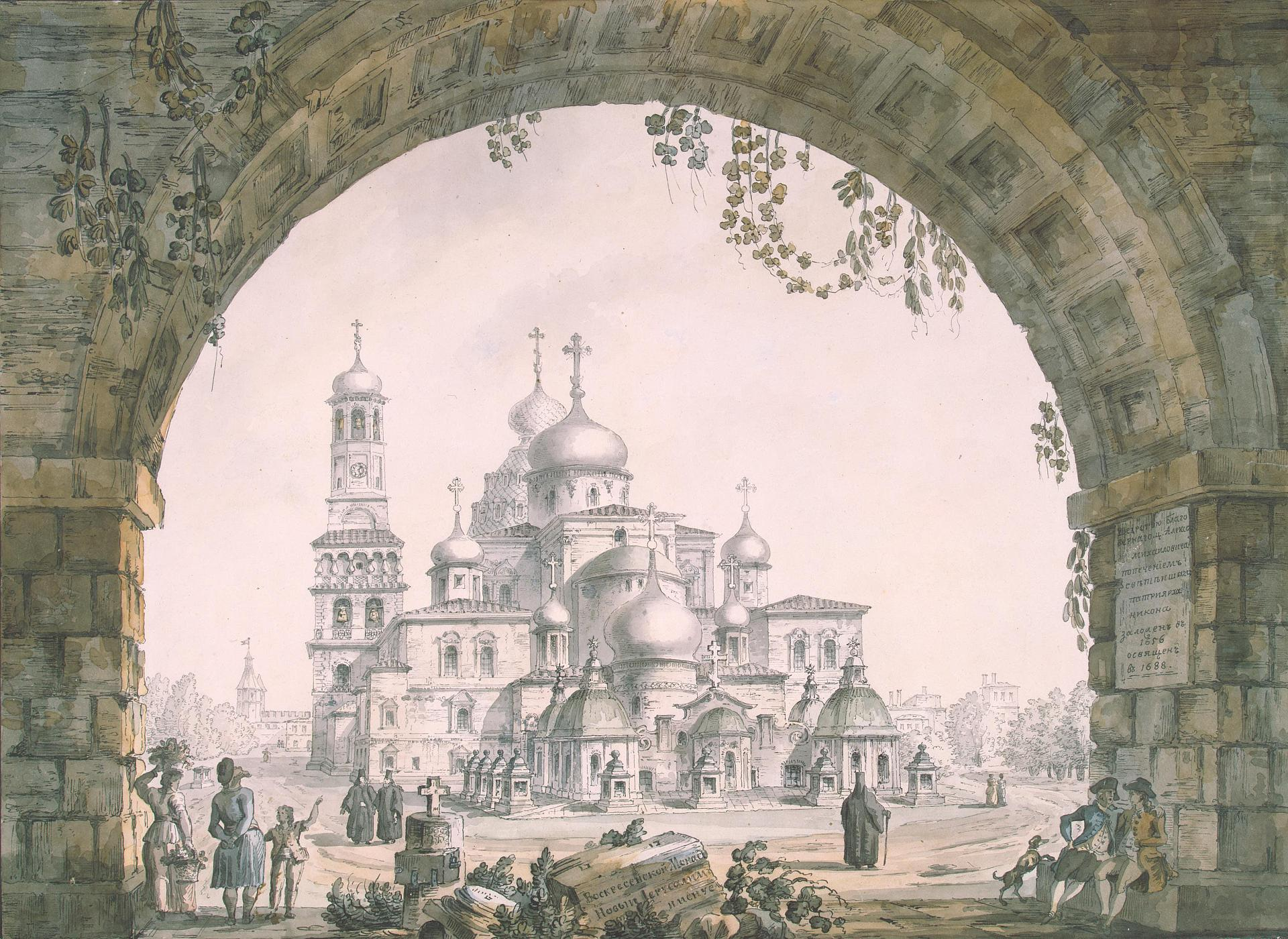
Quarenghi's best known vedute meticulously represent mediaeval monuments of Moscow and its environs.

Emperor Paul disliked everything that was dear to his mother and Quarenghi's architecture fell into this category. After the emperor took the Maltese knights under his protection, Quarenghi also joined the Order and served as its official architect until 1800. His commissions became less frequent, as the monotonous rhythm of solemn colonnades and the laconic clarity of symmetrical compositions appeared boring to those courtiers who had found Quarenghi's designs so delightful a decade earlier.

Under such circumstances, he visited Italy in 1801 and was given a triumphant welcome. He turned his attention to watercolours, enlivening conventional architectural vistas with genre scenes from everyday city life. He also published several albums of neo-Palladian designs (1787, 1791, 1810) and provided elaborate designs for decorative vases, capitals for columns and metalwork executed for imperial residences, particularly the Winter Palace.

With the enthronement of Alexander I of Russia, Quarenghi was again at the height of his individuality and fashion. In 1805 the architect became a corresponding member of the Imperial Academy of Arts. His design for the Anichkov Palace Colonnade, however, incurred severe criticism from the academic establishment for the perceived erratic use of classical orders. Quarenghi defended himself in a letter to Canova proclaiming that "good sense and judgment shouldn't be enslaved by commonly accepted rules and models".

Giacomo Quarenghi was granted Russian nobility and the Order of St. Vladimir of the First Degree in 1814. After 1808 he lived largely in retirement as a celebrity. Of his thirteen children by two wives, a few chose to remain in Russia, while others returned to Italy. He died at age 72 in Saint Petersburg.

When the 150th anniversary of his death was being marked in 1967, the remains of Quarenghi were moved from the Volkov Cemetery to the Lazarevskoe Cemetery at the Alexander Nevsky Monastery, and a bust of the architect was erected between the Assignation Bank and Bank Bridge in Saint Petersburg.

== Works in St Petersburg ==
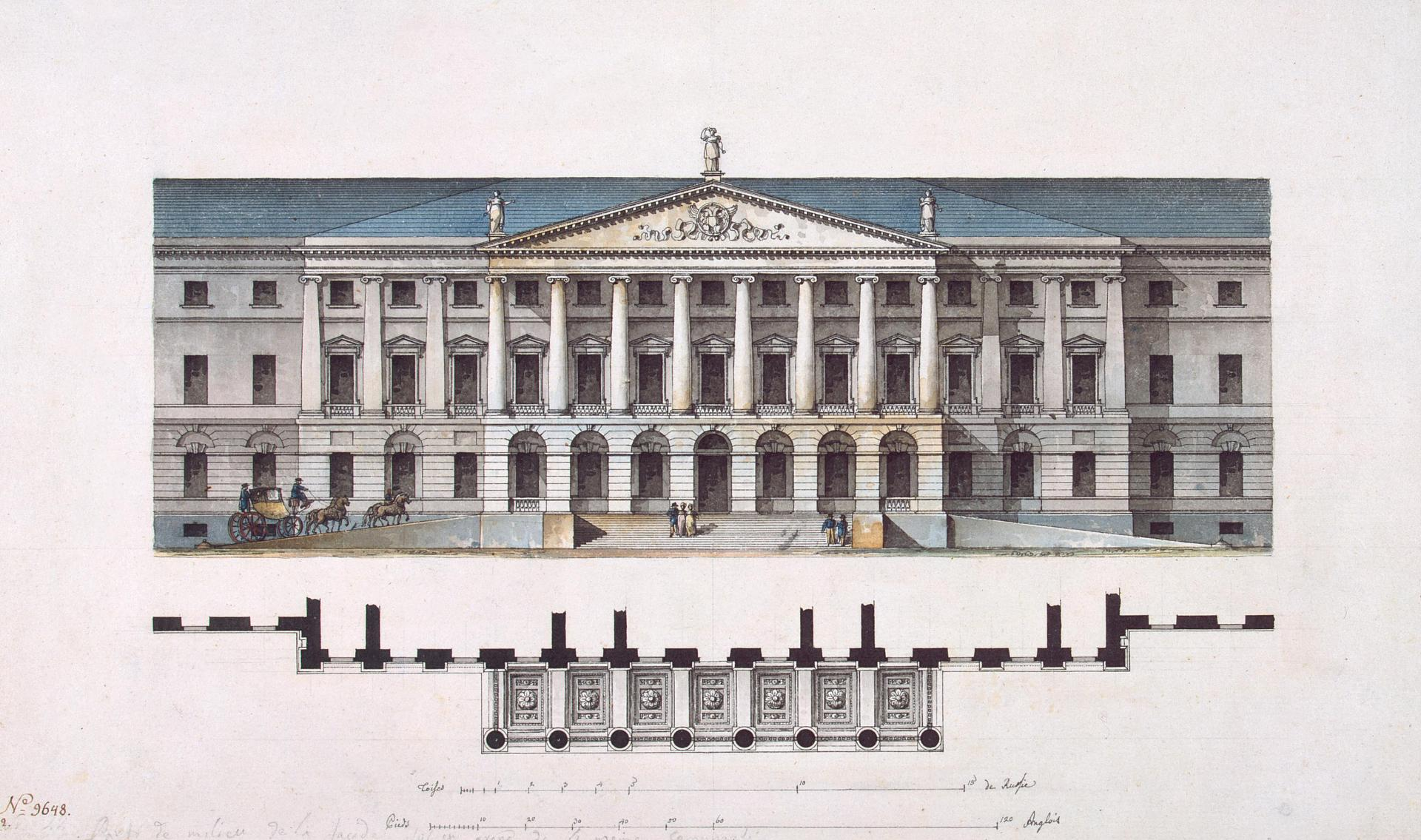
Quarenghi regarded the Smolny Institute for Noble Maidens as the most accomplished project of his declining years.

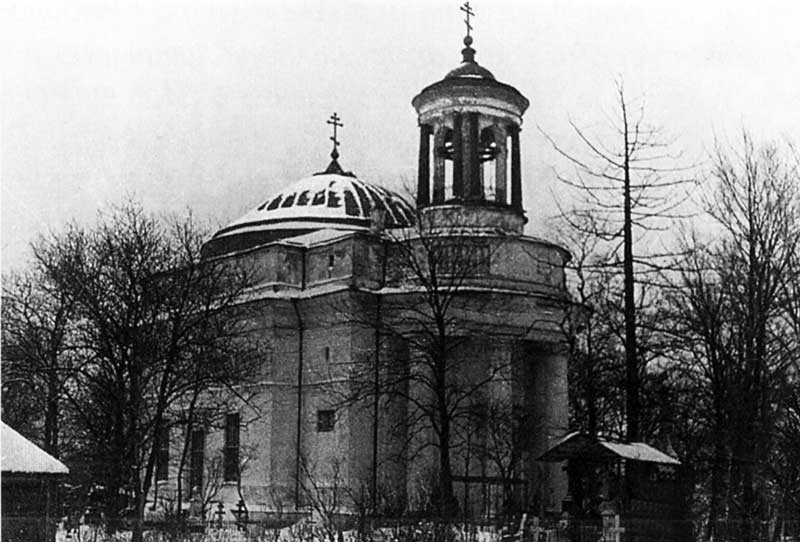
The Kuzmino Church of the Annunciation was one of Quarenghi's first projects in Russia.

- 1782–83 – the Collegium of Foreign Affairs on the English Embankment;
- 1782–87 – St. Mary's Hospital in Pavlovsk;
- 1783–84 – the Bezborodko Country House in Polyustrovo;
- 1783–87 – the Hermitage Theatre, the only surviving 18th-century theatre in St Petersburg, inspired to the Palladio's Teatro Olimpico of Vicenza. The designs of Quarenghi's theatre were engraved and published in 1787, giving him a European reputation;
- 1783–89 – the Academy of Sciences on the University Embankment;
- 1783–89 – the Russian Assignation Bank on Sadovaya Street;
- 1784–87 – the Silver Rows on Nevsky Prospekt;
- 1786 – wrought-iron bridge in Tsarskoye Selo;
- 1787–92 – the Raphael Loggia in the Winter Palace;
- 1789–96 – the Main Apothecary on Millionaya Street;
- 1784–86 – the Saltykov house on the Field of Mars;
- 1788–90 – the Vietinghoff house on Admiralty Prospect;
- 1790 – the Yusupov house on Sadovaya Street;
- 1791 – the belfry of the Vladimirskaya Church;
- 1792–96 – the Alexander Palace, designed for St Petersburg but simplified when it was erected in the Alexander Park of Tsarskoye Selo; pavilions in the landscape part of the Catherine Park, including the Concert Hall pavilion (1782 – 1786/88), the Kitchen Ruins (1780s), the Hall on the Island (1794);
- 1797–1800 the Maltese Chapel at the Vorontsov Palace;
- 1803–05 – St. Mary's Hospital for the Poor on Liteiny Prospect;
- 1804–07 – the Catherine Institute on the Fontanka Embankment (affiliated with the Russian National Library);
- 1803–09 – the Imperial Cabinet of the Anichkov Palace on Nevsky Prospect;
- 1806–08 – the Smolny Institute for Noble Maidens (illustrated, to the right);
- 1804–07 – the Cavalry Manege, or Riding Academy on St Isaac's Square (1804–07);
- 1814 – the Narva Triumphal Gate, later replaced by a permanent structure to a design by Vasily Stasov;
- 1814–16 – the Anglican Church on the English Embankment.

== Sources ==
- "Кваренги, Джакомо" . Brockhaus and Efron Encyclopedic Dictionary (in Russian). 1906.
- Taleporovsky V.N. Кваренги. Leningrad-Moscow, 1954.
- Grimm G.G. Кваренги. Leningrad, 1962.
- Disegni di Giacomo Quarenghi. (Exhibition catalogue), Venice, 1967 (Contents).
- Pilyavsky V.I. Джакомо Кваренги: Архитектор. Художник. Leningrad, 1981.
- Giacomo Quarenghi: architetto a Pietroburgo: Lettere e altri scritti. Venice, 1988.
- Fabbriche e disegni di Giacomo Quarenghi. Bergamo, 1994 (reprint of 1821 edition).
- Giacomo Quarenghi: Architetture e vedute. Milano, 1994.
