= Anichkov Palace =

Russian imperial palace

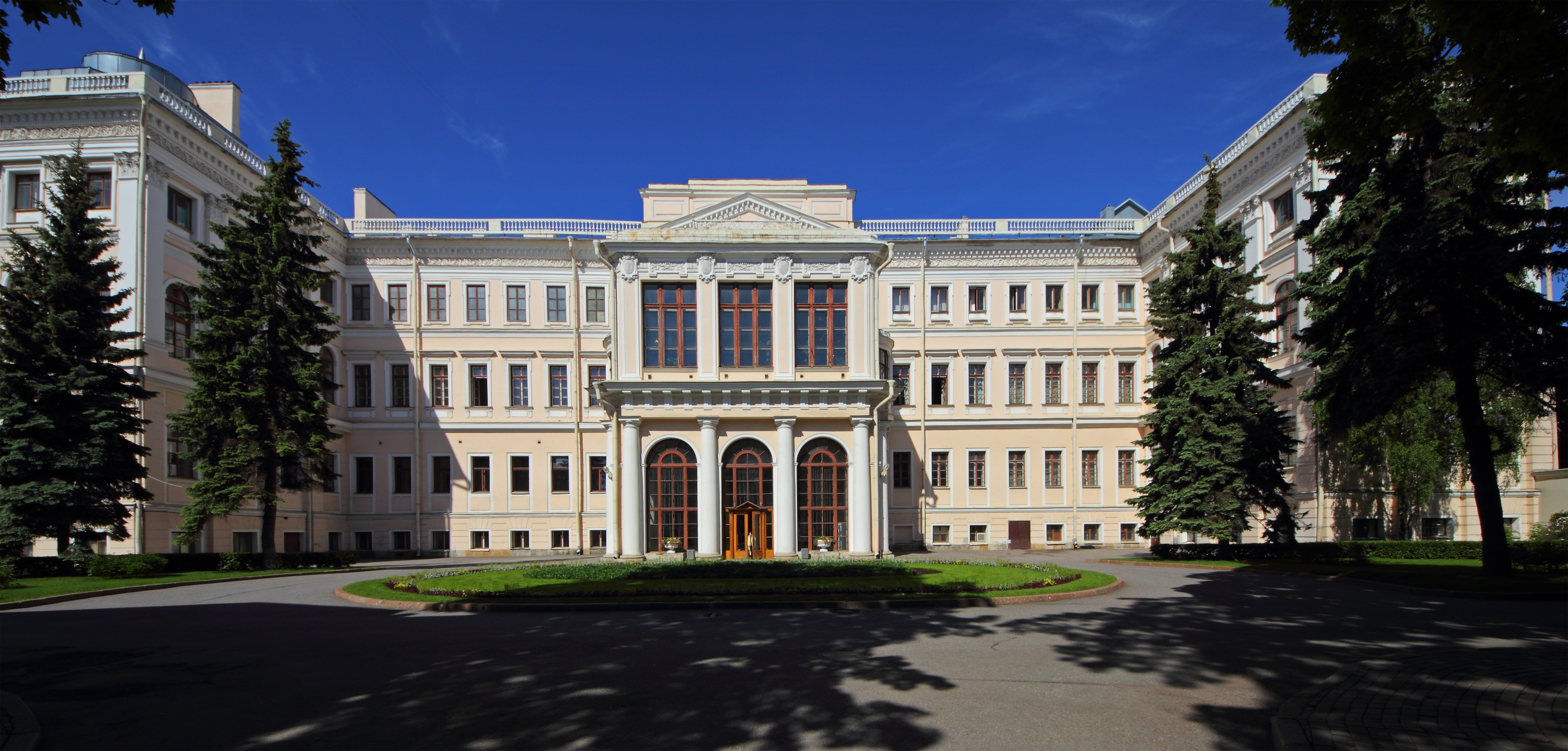

- Location within Northwestern Federal District
- 59°55′58″N 30°20′23″E
- Location: Saint Petersburg, Russia

History
- Built: 1741-1754
- Built for: Elizabeth of Russia

Site notes
- Architectural style: Baroque architecture

The Anichkov Palace, a former imperial palace in Saint Petersburg, stands at the intersection of Nevsky Avenue and the Fontanka River.

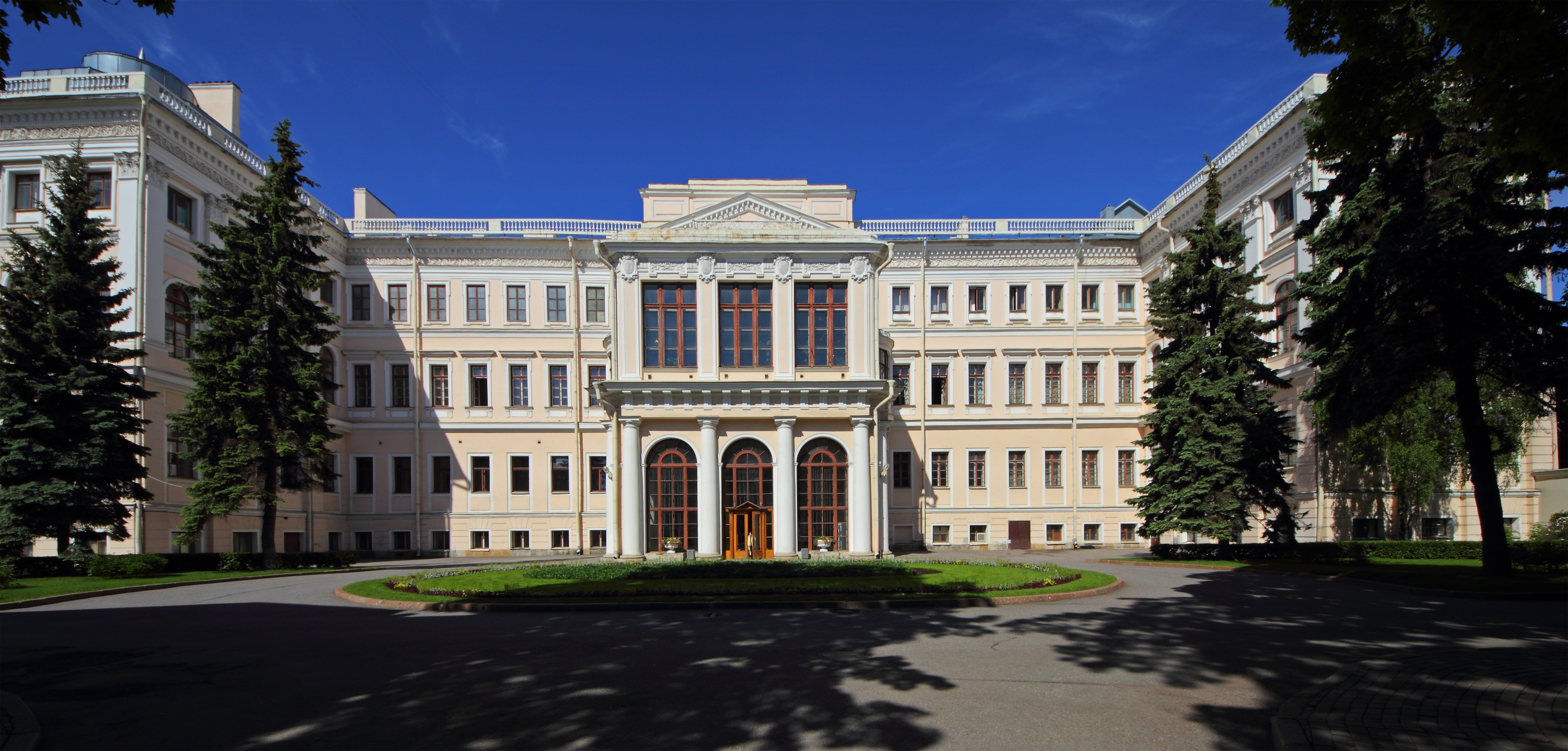
The cour d'honneur

== History ==
=== 18th century ===
The palace, situated on the plot formerly owned by Antonio de Vieira (1682?-1745), takes its name from the nearby Anichkov Bridge across the Fontanka. Designed for the Empress Elizabeth of Russia (r. 1741–1762) in a dazzling Baroque style, the palace came to be known as the most imposing private residence of the era of Elizabeth Petrovna. Some suggest architects Bartolomeo Rastrelli and Mikhail Zemtsov were responsible for the design, though that is yet to be substantiated. The main frontage faces the river and was originally connected to it by a canal.

Construction works continued for thirteen years; when they finally finished in 1754 the Empress Elizabeth presented the palace to her favourite (and likely spouse), Count Aleksey Razumovsky. After his death in 1771, the palace reverted to the crown, but Catherine the Great of Russia (r. 1762–1796) donated it to her own favourite, Prince Potemkin, in 1776. The architect Ivan Starov was charged with extensive renovations of the palace in the newly-fashionable Neoclassical style, which were effected in 1778 and 1779. Simultaneously an English garden architect, William Hould, laid out a regular park.

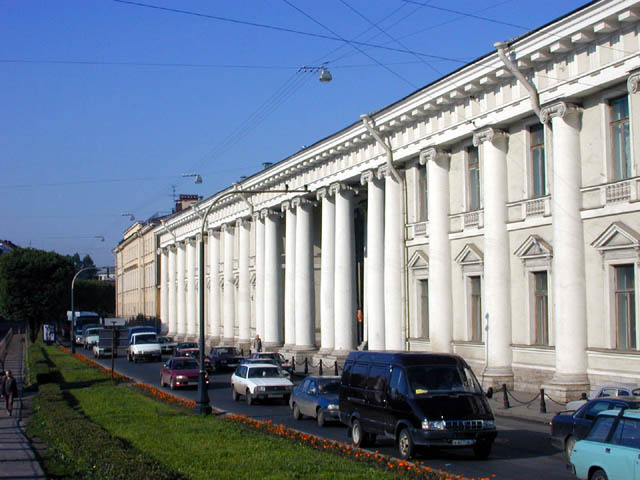
The colonnade of Her Imperial Majesty's Cabinet (designed by Giacomo Quarenghi)

Upon Potemkin's demise (1791), the palace was restored to the crown and adapted to accommodate Her Imperial Majesty's Cabinet.

=== 19th and 20th centuries ===
The last major structural additions occurred in the reign (1801–1825) of Emperor Alexander I, with Quarenghi's construction of the Imperial Cabinet along Nevsky Avenue. The latter structure was formulated in a rigorous Neoclassical style and many people feel that it doesn't complement Rastrelli's original work. Three years later, Alexander I bestowed the palace on his sister, Grand Duchess Elena Pavlovna of Russia – she later became the Grand Duchess of Mecklenburg-Schwerin by marriage. In 1816, Carlo Rossi presented his project of reconstruction of the palace, but it wasn't followed. Several architects, have worked on the edifice since then, and its interiors were continuously refurbished.

Following his marriage in 1866 the future Tsar Alexander III and his wife, Maria Feodorovna, made the Anichkov Palace their St. Petersburg residence, ensuring its refacing in a variety of historic styles. There their children, including the last Russian emperor, Nicholas II, spent their childhood years, and after Alexander III came to the throne in 1881, he preferred to stay at the Anichkov Palace (as opposed to the Winter Palace). The Anichkov provided the setting for numerous family festivities, including the wedding of Emperor Nicholas's niece Irina Romanova to Prince Felix Yusupov in 1914. Nicholas II's mother, after becoming dowager empress, continued to have the right of residence in the palace until the February Revolution of 1917, although she had moved to Kiev away from St. Petersburg. After the revolution the Ministry of Provisions moved in.

Following the October Revolution of November 1917, the Bolshevik government nationalized the Anichkov Palace and designated it the St. Petersburg City Museum. After 1934, when it was converted into the Young Pioneer Palace, the palace housed over one-hundred after-school clubs for more than 10,000 children. While a small museum inside is open to the public at selected times, the edifice is normally not accessible to tourists.

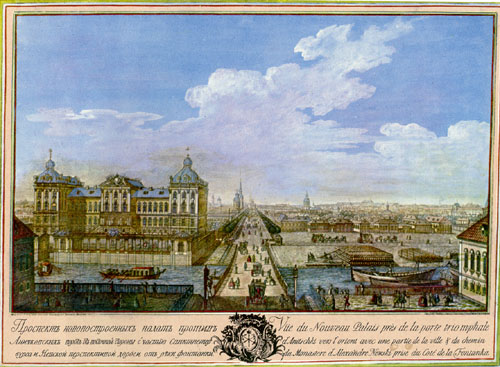
Anichkov Bridge and Anichkov Palace in 1753.

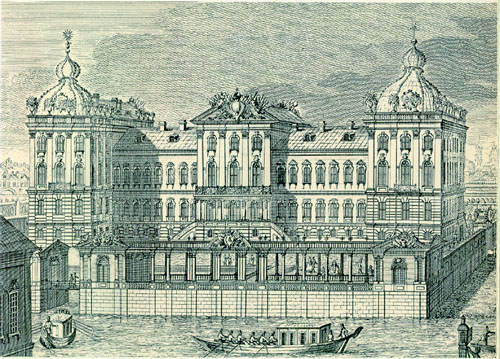
Palace in the 1750s: Elizabethan Baroque at its most flamboyant

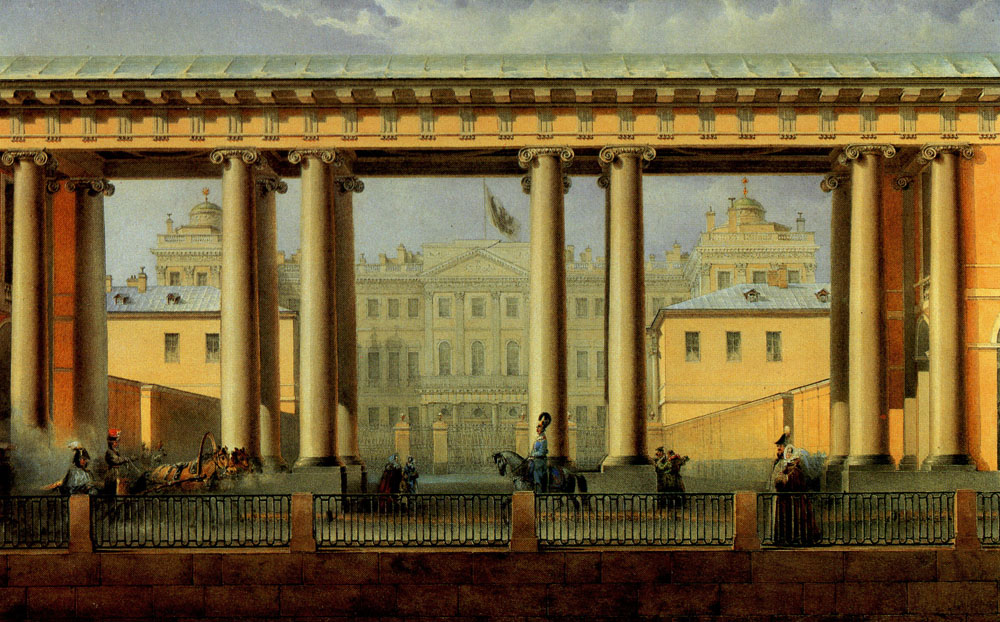
Palace in the 1830s: after the Neoclassical renovation

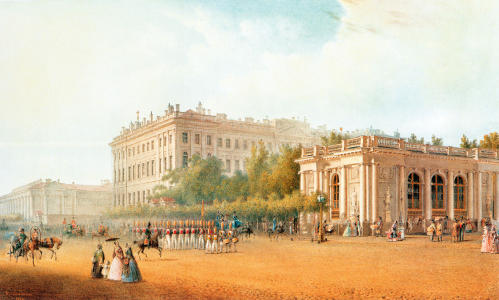
Palace in 1862.

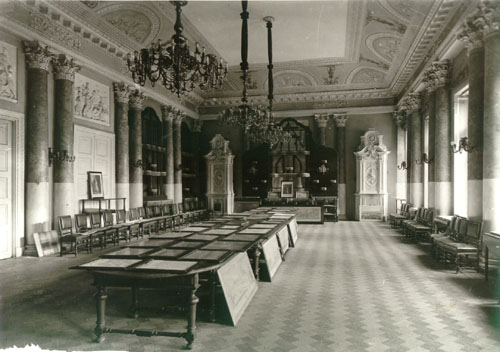
Interior of one of the halls in the early 20th century
