= List of bridges in Saint Petersburg =

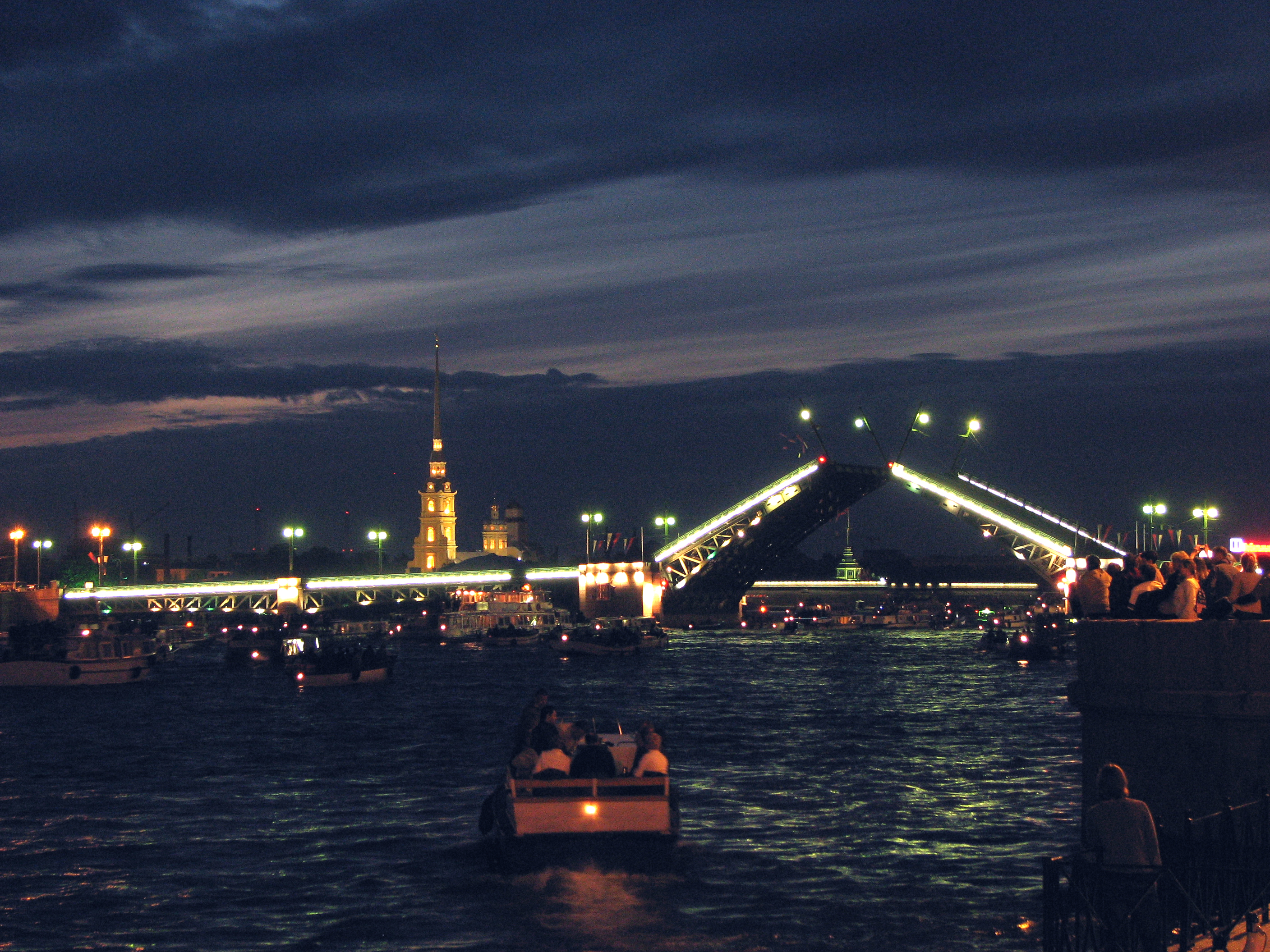
Palace Bridge drawing, an iconic sight of St. Petersburg

There are more than 400 bridges in the city limits of Saint Petersburg, Russia. This is a partial list of the most famous ones.

Peter the Great was designing the city as another Amsterdam and Venice, with canals instead of streets and citizens skillful in sailing. Initially, there were only about ten bridges constructed in the city, mainly across ditches and minor creeks. By Peter's plans, in the summer months, the citizens were supposed to move around in boats, and in the winter months when the water froze to move in sledges. However, after Peter's death, new bridges were built, as it was a much easier way of transportation. Temporary ponton bridges were used in the summertime. The first permanent bridge of bricks and stones across the main branch of the Neva river appeared in 1850.

Today, there are more 342 bridges over canals and rivers of various sizes, styles and constructions, built at different periods. Some of them are small pedestrian bridges, such as Bank and Lion bridges, others are huge transport arteries such as almost one kilometer long Alexander Nevsky Bridge. There are about 800 small bridges across hundreds of smaller ponds and lakes in public parks and gardens, and over 100 bridges in various ports, marinas, yacht clubs and private industries. The total number of bridges in Saint Petersburg is over a thousand. The nearly 100-meter-wide Blue Bridge, claimed to be the widest in the world, spans the Moyka River. There are bridges designed in various styles with such decorations as statues, lamplights, lions, horses, sphinxes and griffins, and there are modern styles lacking any decor. Thanks to the intricate web of canals, Saint Petersburg is often called the "Venice of the North" which is a popular poetic name for the northern capital.

The names of the bridges are of a great diversity as well. Some take their names from geographic locations — such as English, Italian and Egyptian bridges. Other names refer to the places such as Postoffice, Theater and Bank bridges. Many bridges are named after famous people - Alexander Nevsky, Peter the Great, Lomonosov bridges. There are "colored" bridges — Red, Green, Blue and Yellow bridges.

A familiar view of Saint Petersburg is a drawbridge across the Neva. Every night during the navigation period from April to November, 22 bridges across Neva and main canals are drawn to let ships pass in and out of the Baltic Sea into the Volga-Baltic waterway system. A calculated schedule with precise time of consecutive opening and closing for each bridge is maintained to guarantee passage of cargo ships and tankers at a precisely controlled speed, in order to have at least one bridge at a time staying connected to ensure passage for firefighters, police, ambulances and other ground transportation.

== Facts by numbers ==
- There are 342 bridges inside the city limits, 5 in Kronstadt, 54 in Tsarskoye Selo, 51 in Petergof, 16 in Pavlovsk and 7 in Oranienbaum.
- The total length of all the city bridges is approximately 16 kilometers (9.9 mi)
- 22 are drawbridges
- The longest bridge is Big Obukhovsky Bridge across Neva River (2,824 meters (9,265 ft))
- The widest bridge is Blue Bridge across Moyka River (97.3 meters (319 ft)), which is also claimed to be the widest bridge in the world by some sources, however the Big Bridge in Lockport New York is 400 feet (120 m) wide.

== Bridges across Neva and Great Neva ==
Bridges are numbered downstream, with initials to determine which distributary they cross.

No.	Name	Crosses	Drawbridge opening times
1	Big Obukhovsky Bridge	Neva	N/A
2	Volodarsky Bridge	Neva River	(2:00–3:45, 4:15–5:45)
3	Finland Railway Bridge	Neva River	(2:20–5:30)
4	Alexander Nevsky Bridge	Neva River	(2:20–5:10)
5	Bolsheokhtinsky Bridge	Neva River	(2:00–5:00)
6	Liteyny Bridge	Neva River	(1:40–4:45)
7	Trinity Bridge	Neva River	(1:20–4:50)
8B	Palace Bridge	Great Neva	(1:10-2:50, 3:10-4:55)
9B	Annunciation Bridge	Great Neva	(1:25–2:45, 3:10–5:00)
8M	Exchange Bridge	Little Neva	(2:00–4:55)
9M	Tuchkov Bridge	Little Neva	(2:00–2:55, 3:35–4:55)
7K	Sampsonievsky Bridge	Great Nevka	(preliminary request 1:30-4:30)
8K	Grenadier Bridge	Great Nevka	(preliminary request 1:30-4:30)
9K	Kantemirovsky Bridge	Great Nevka	(preliminary request 1:30-4:30)
10KB	Ushakovsky Bridge	Great Nevka	
11KB	Third Elagin Bridge	Great Nevka	
10KS	First Elagin Bridge	Middle Nevka	
11KS	Second Elagin Bridge	Middle Nevka	
10 km	Kamennoostrovsky Bridge	Little Nevka	
11 km	Bolshoy Krestovsky Bridge	Little Nevka	
12 km	Lazarevskiy Bridge	Little Nevka	
13 km	Bolshoy Petrovsky Bridge	Little Nevka	

== Bridges across the Griboyedov Canal ==
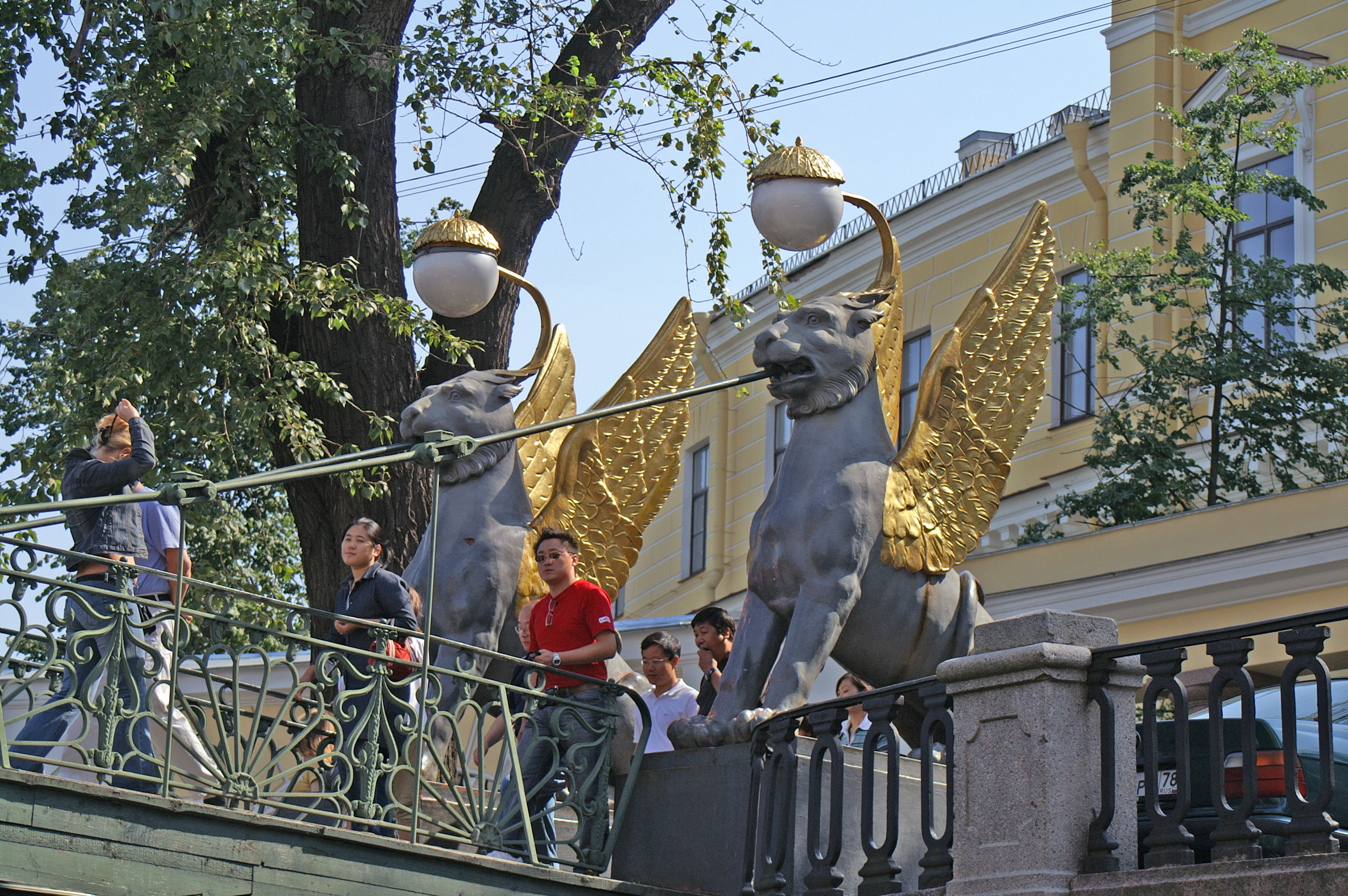
Griffon statues on Bank bridge

- Theater Bridge
- Novo-Konyushenny Bridge
- Italian Bridge
- Kazansky Bridge
- Bank Bridge
- Flour Bridge
- Stone Bridge
- Demidov Bridge
- Hay Bridge
- Kokushkin Bridge
- Voznesensky Bridge
- Podyachesky Bridge
- Bridge of Four Lions
- Kharlamov Bridge
- Novo-Nikolsky Bridge
- Krasnogvardeysky Bridge
- Pikalov Bridge
- Mogilyovsky Bridge
- Alarchin Bridge
- Kolomensky Bridge
- Malo-Kalinkin Bridge

== Bridges across Fontanka ==
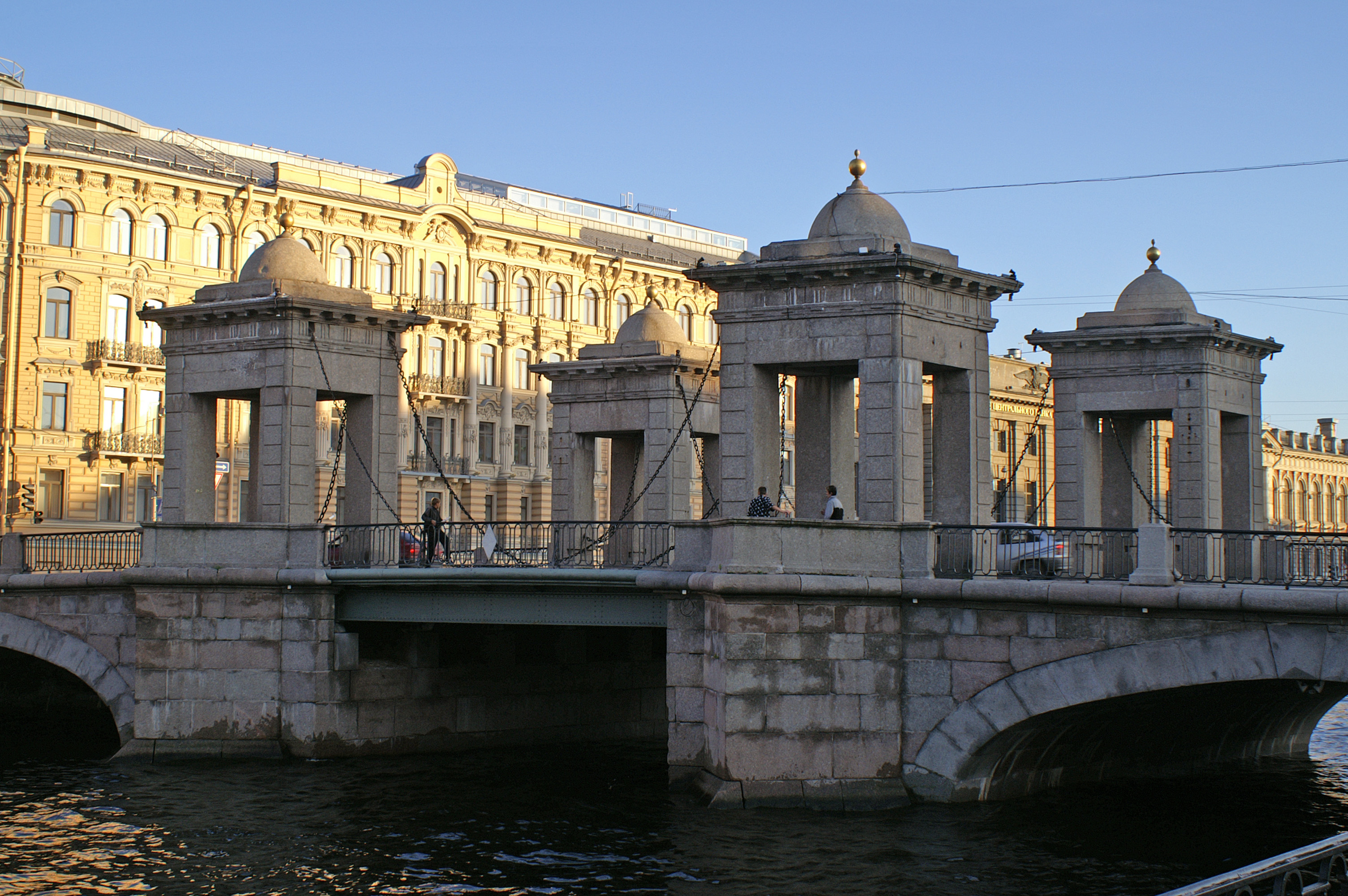
Lomonosov Bridge

- Prachechny Bridge
- Panteleymonovsky Bridge
- Belinsky Bridge
- Anichkov Bridge
- Lomonosov Bridge
- Letushkov Bridge
- Semenovsky Bridge
- Gorstkin Bridge
- Obukhovsky Bridge
- Izmailovsky Bridge
- Krasnoarmeysky Bridge
- Egyptian Bridge
- English Bridge
- Staro-Kalinkin Bridge
- Galerny Bridge

== Bridges across Moyka ==
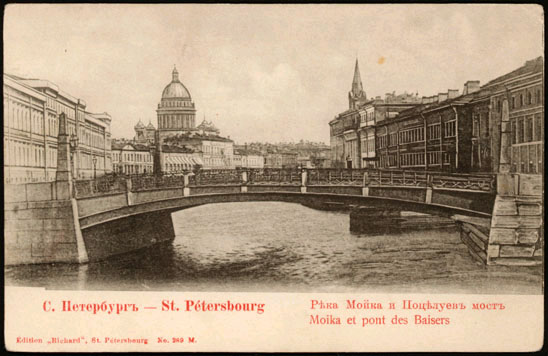
Potseluev Bridge

- First Engineer Bridge
- First Sadovy Bridge
- Second Sadovy Bridge
- Malo-Konyushenny Bridge
- Bolshoy Konyushenny Bridge
- Pevchesky Bridge
- Green Bridge
- Red Bridge
- Blue Bridge
- Fonarny Bridge
- Pochtamtsky Bridge
- Potseluev Bridge
- Krasnoflotsky Bridge
- Hrapovitsky Bridge
- Korabelny Bridge

== Bridges across Winter Canal ==
- Hermitage Bridge
- First Winter Bridge
- Second Winter Bridge

== Bridges across the Kryukov Canal ==
- Smezhny Bridge
- Staro-Nikolsky Bridge
- Kashin Bridge
- Torgovy Bridge
- Dekabristov Bridge
- Matveevsky Bridge

== Bridges across the Obvodny Canal ==
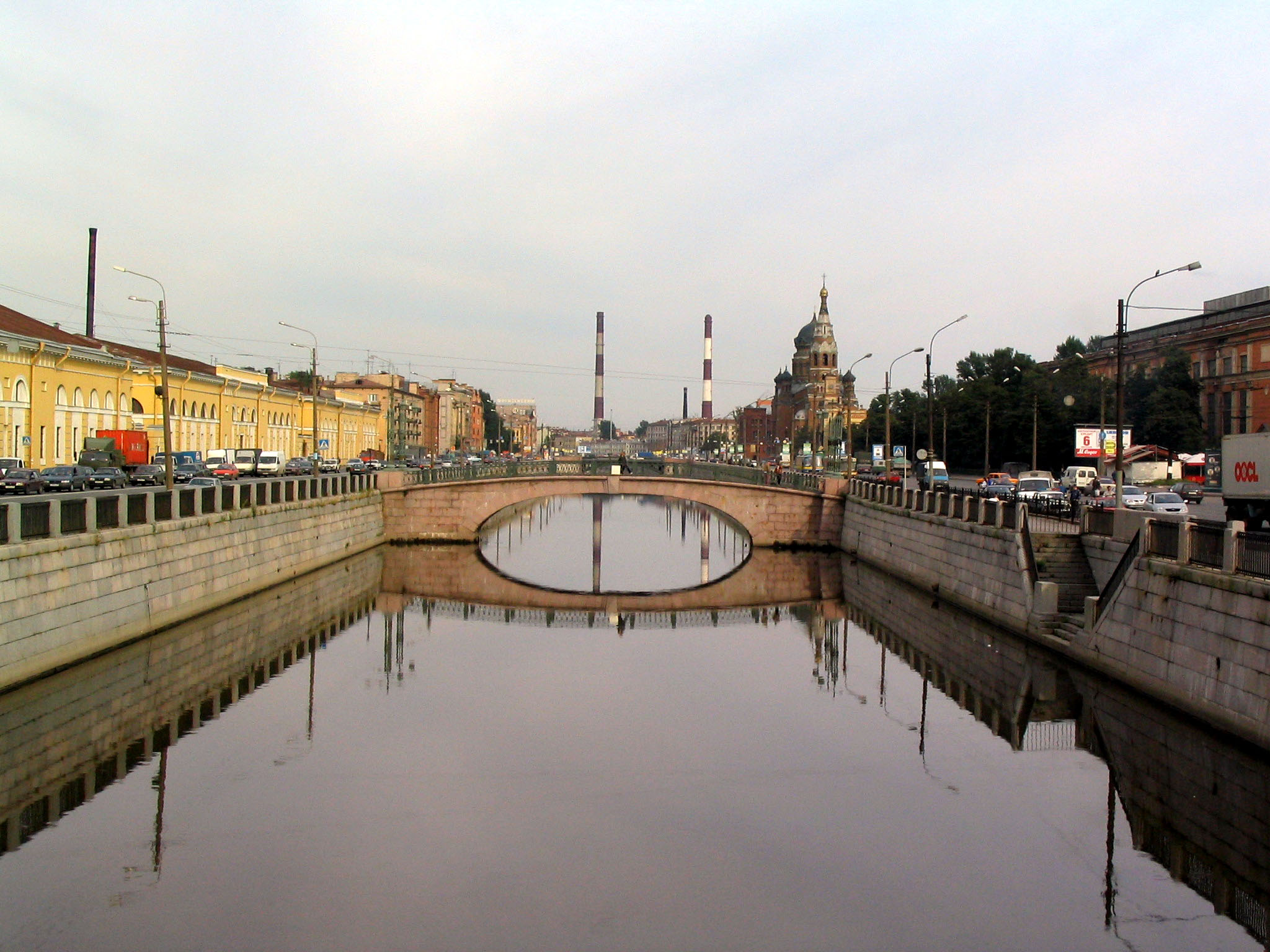
Baltic bridge across Obvodnyi canal

- Shlisserburg Bridge
- Atamansky Bridge
- Nikolaevsky railway Bridge
- Predtechny Bridge
- Novo-kamenniy bridge
- Borovoy Bridge
- Ippodromny Bridge
- Tsarskoselsky railway Bridge
- Ruzovsky Bridge
- Mozhaysky Bridge
- Gazovy Bridge
- Maslyny Bridge
- Novo-Moskovky Bridge
- Warsaw Bridge
- Baltic Bridge
- Novo-Peterofsky Bridge
- Krasnooktyabrsky Bridge
- Tarakanovsky Bridge
- Borisov Bridge
- Novo-Kalinkin Bridge
- Stepan Razin Bridge

== Bridges across the Okhta ==
- Armashevsky Bridge
- Bolshoy Ilinsky Bridge
- Industrial Bridge
- Irinovsky Bridge
- Komarovsky Bridga
- Malookhtinsky Bridge
- Obyezdnoy Bridge
- Utkin Bridge
- Shaumyana Bridge

== Bridges across Okkervil ==
- Utkin Bridge
- Zanevsky Bridge
- Yablonovsky Bridge
- Rossijsky Bridge
- Kollontay Bridge
- Podvoisky Bridge
- Tovarischesky Bridge
- Dybenko Bridge

== Bridges across Smolenka (river) ==
- Uralsky Bridge
- Smolensky Bridge
- Nalichny Bridge
- Shipbuilders' Bridge

== Bridges across the Swan Canal ==
- Upper Swan Bridge
- Lower Swan Bridge

== Image gallery ==
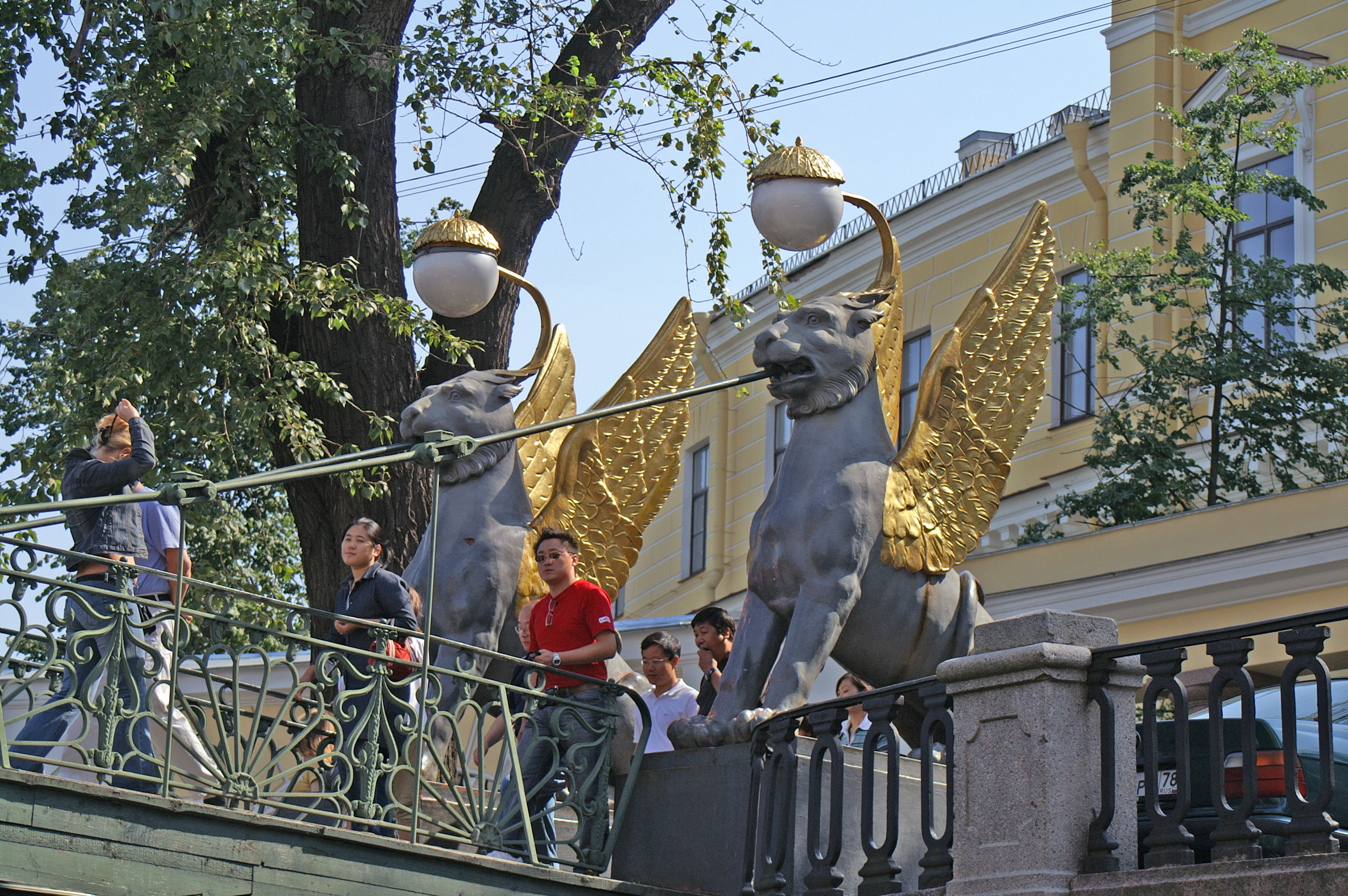
Griffon statues on Bank Bridge

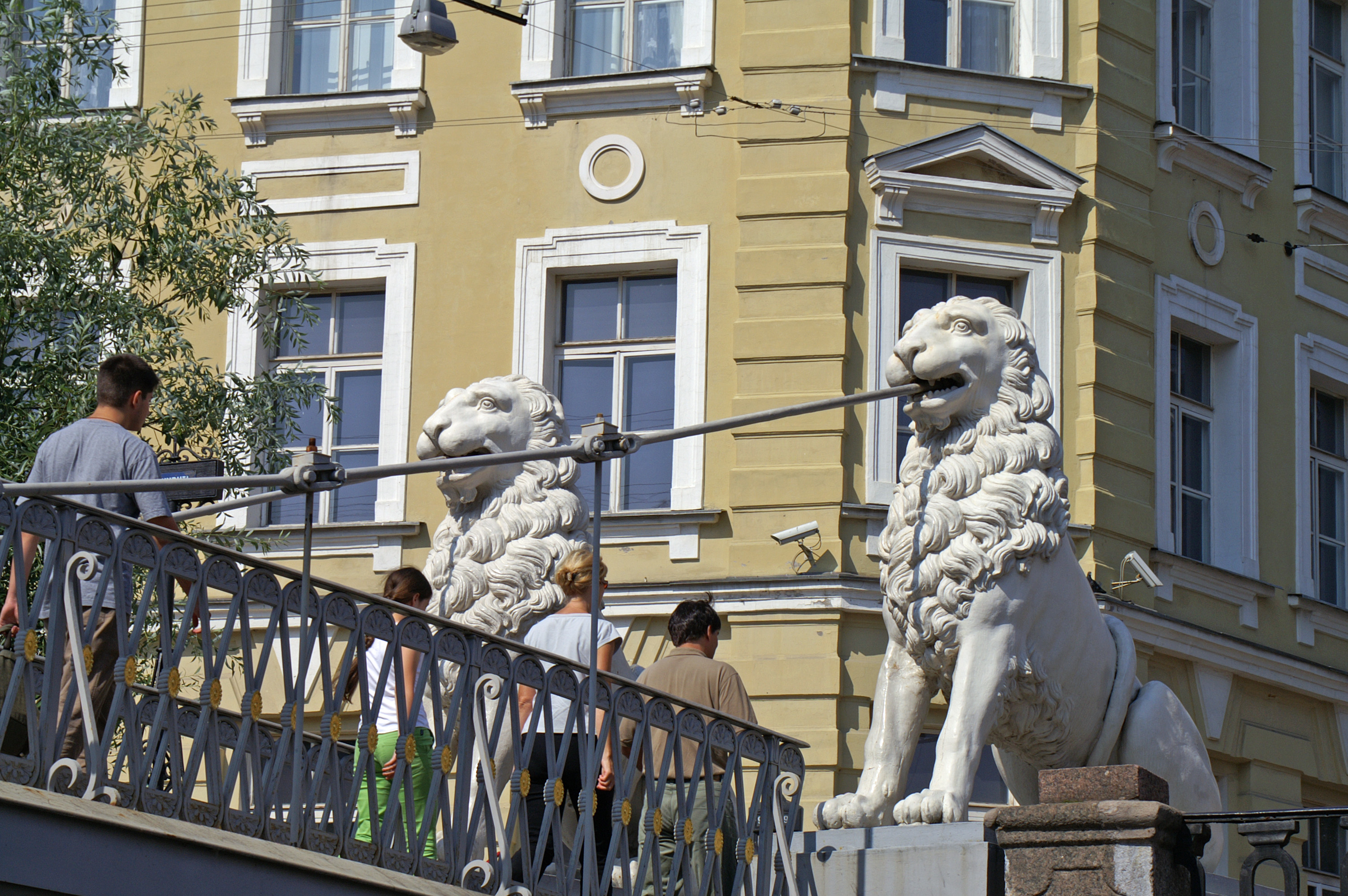
Lions on the Bridge of Four Lions

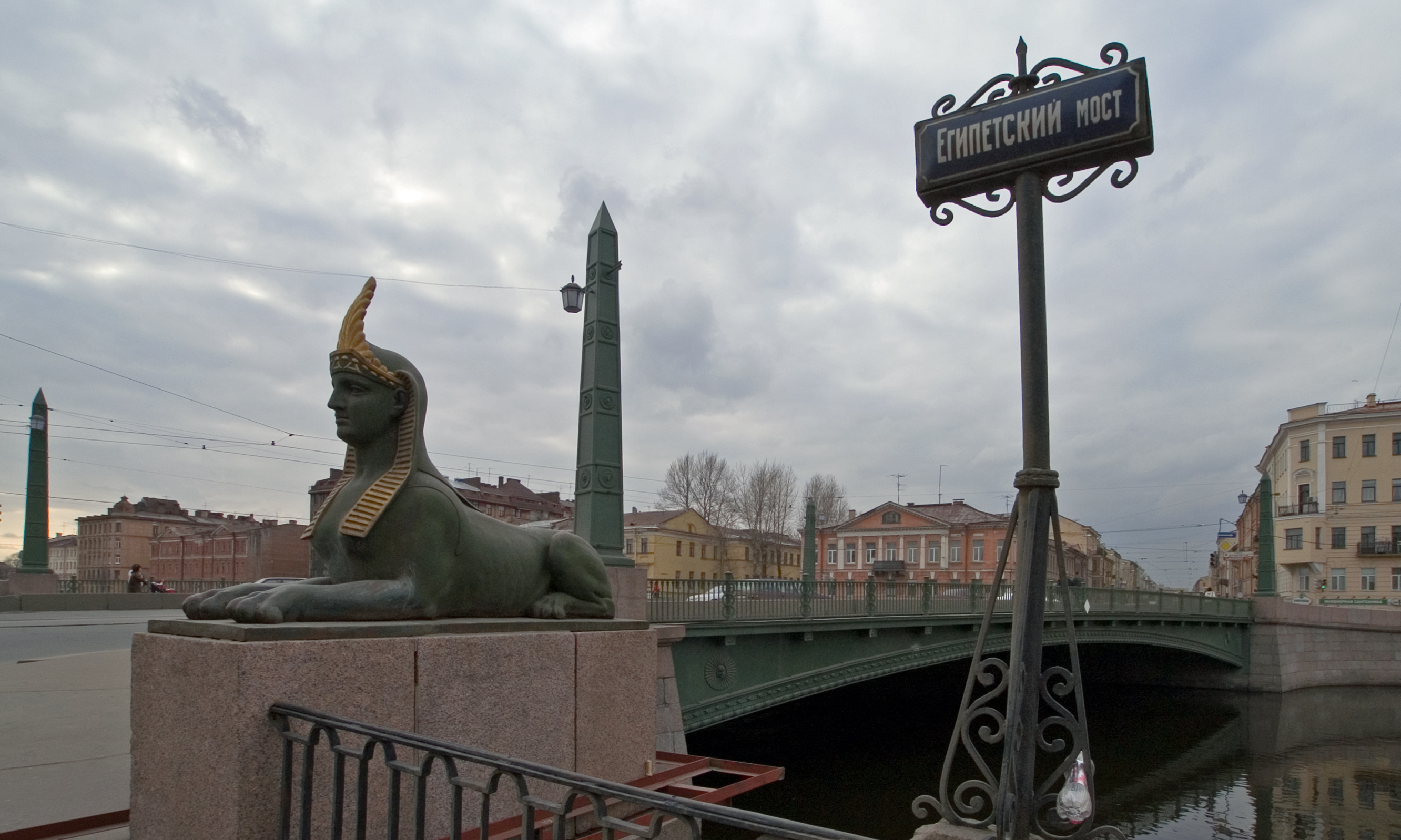
Sphinx on Egyptian Bridge

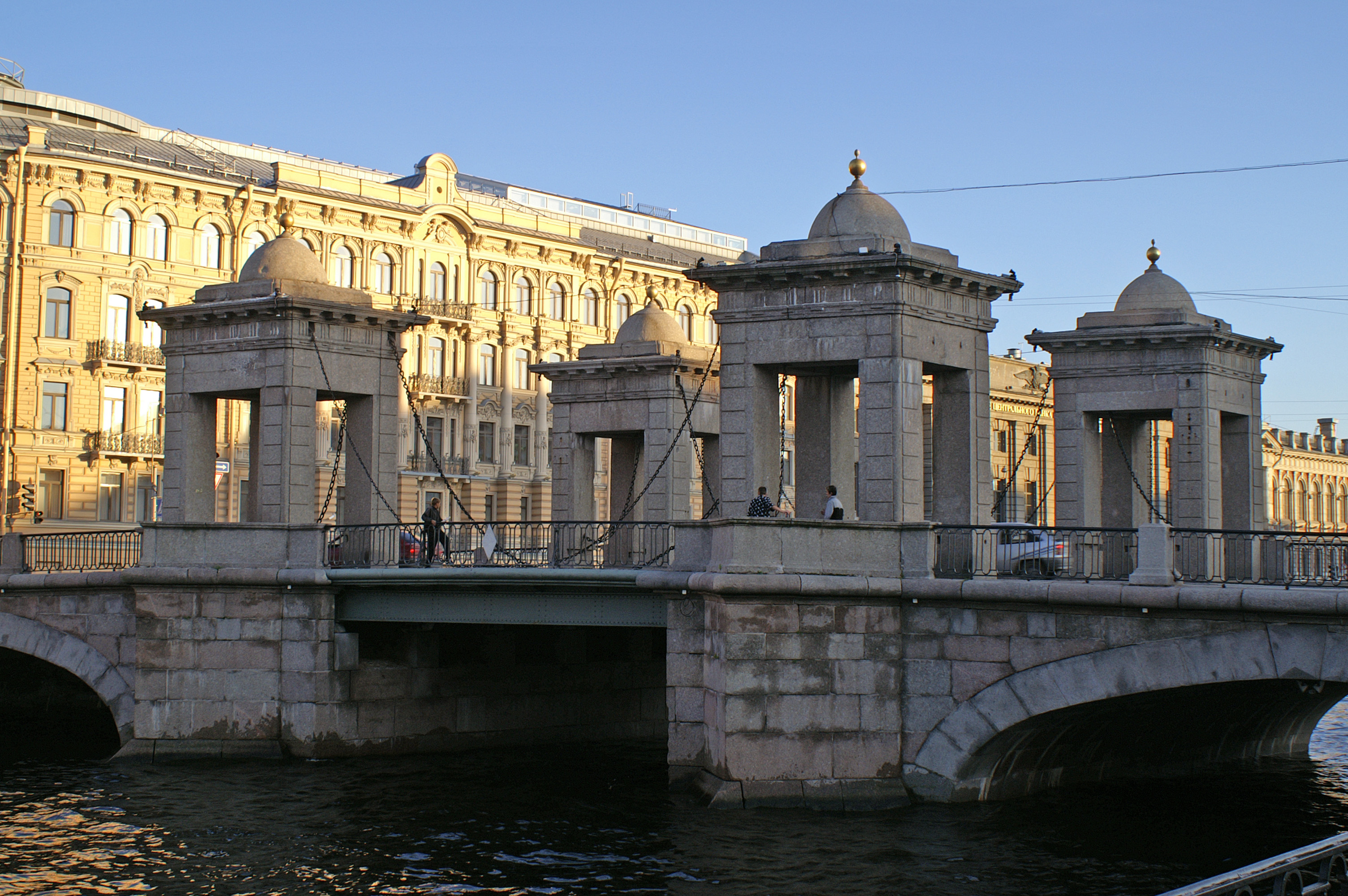
Towers on Lomonosov Bridge

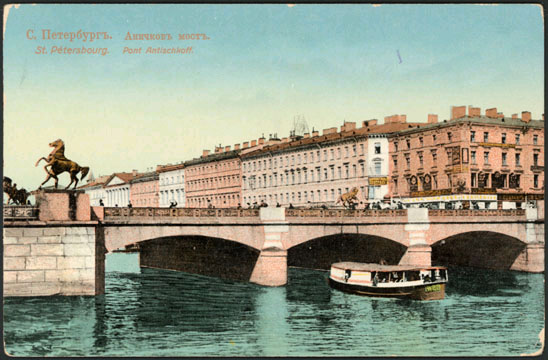
Horse Tamers on Anichkov Bridge

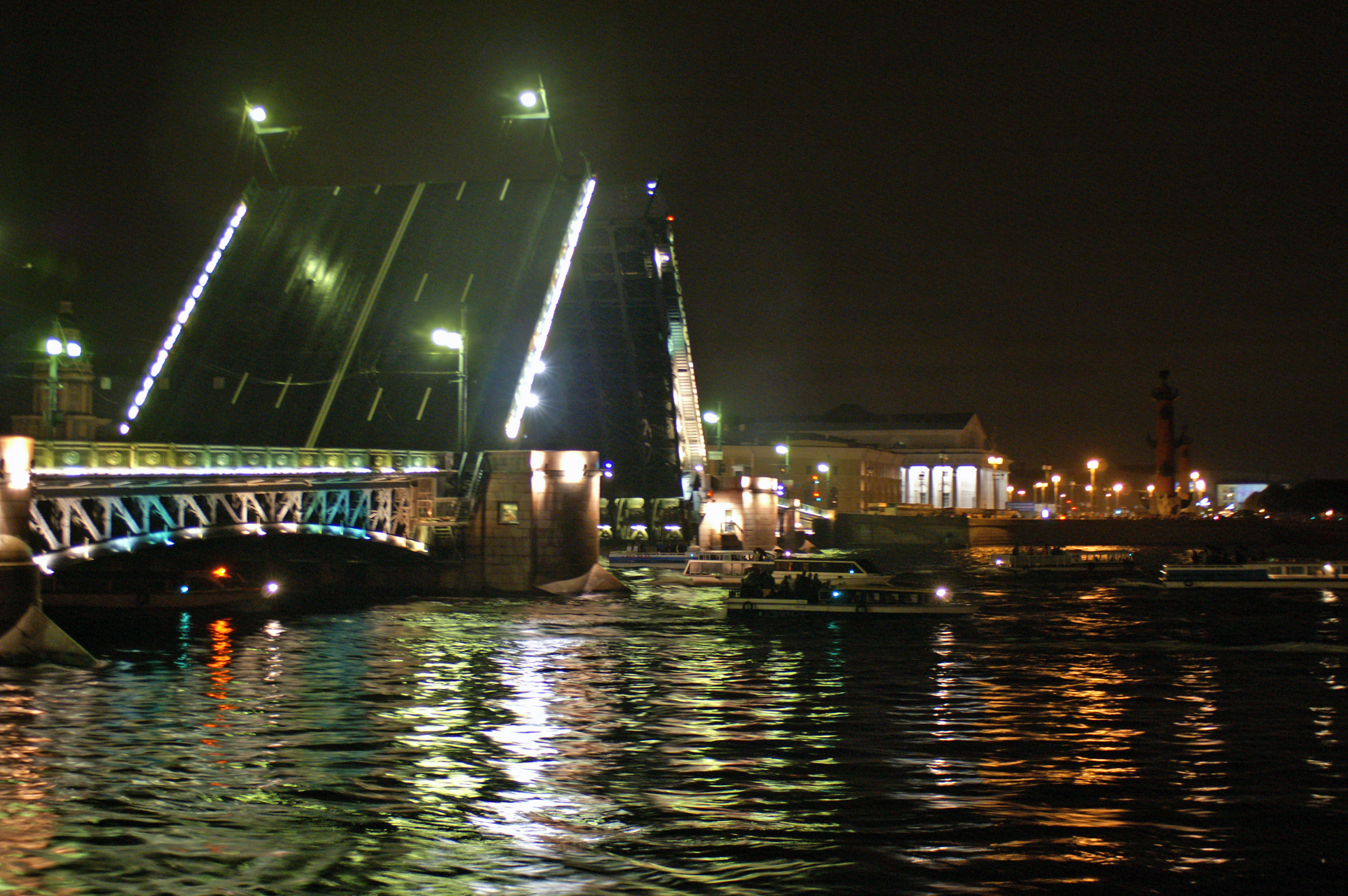
Palace Bridge at night

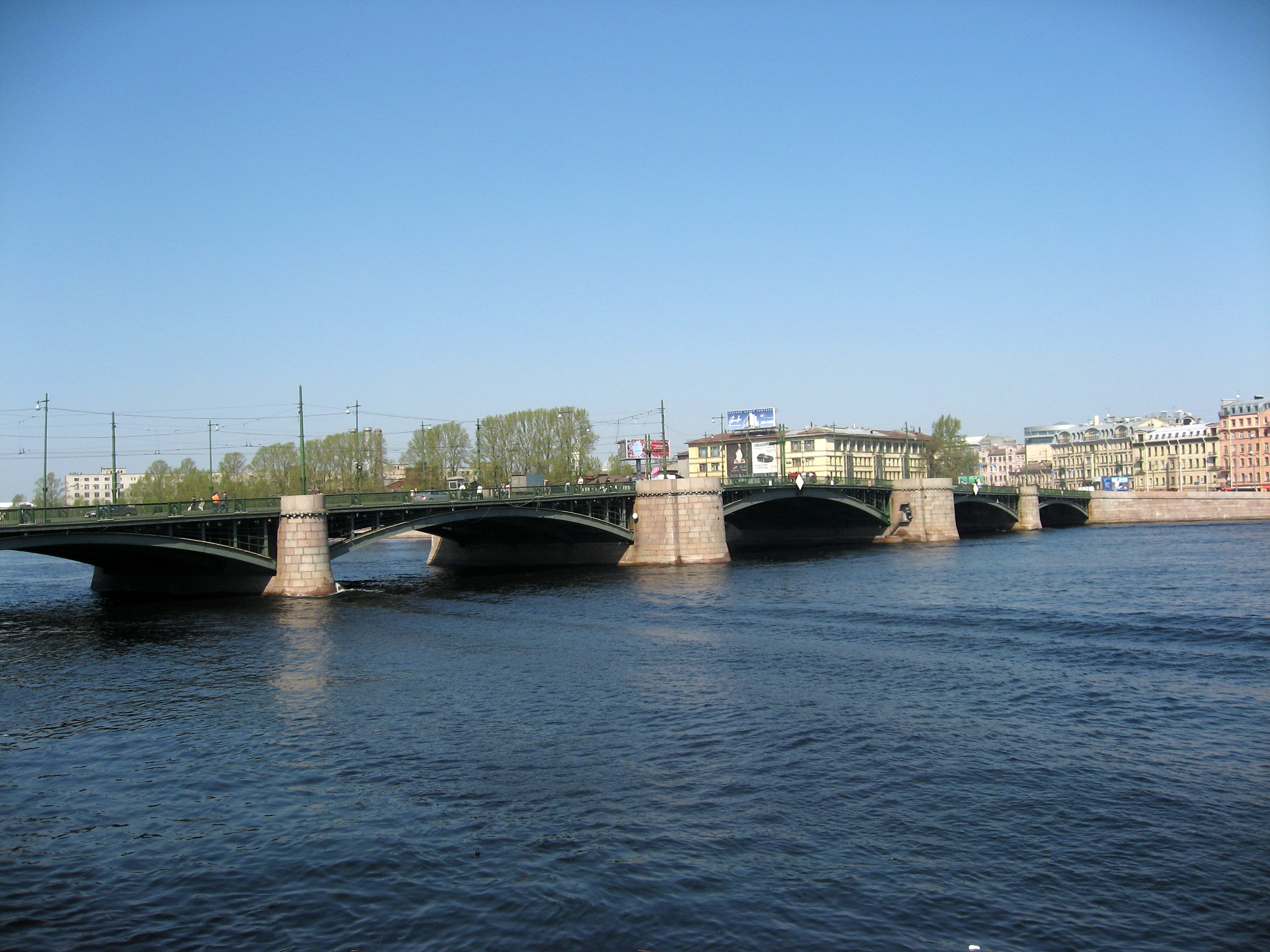
Exchange Bridge

== See also ==
Except bridges, in Saint Petersburg there are other kinds of crossings:

Tunnels

- Orlovsky tunnel
- Kanonersky tunnel

Ferries

- Railway ferry line
