= Staro-Kalinkin Bridge =

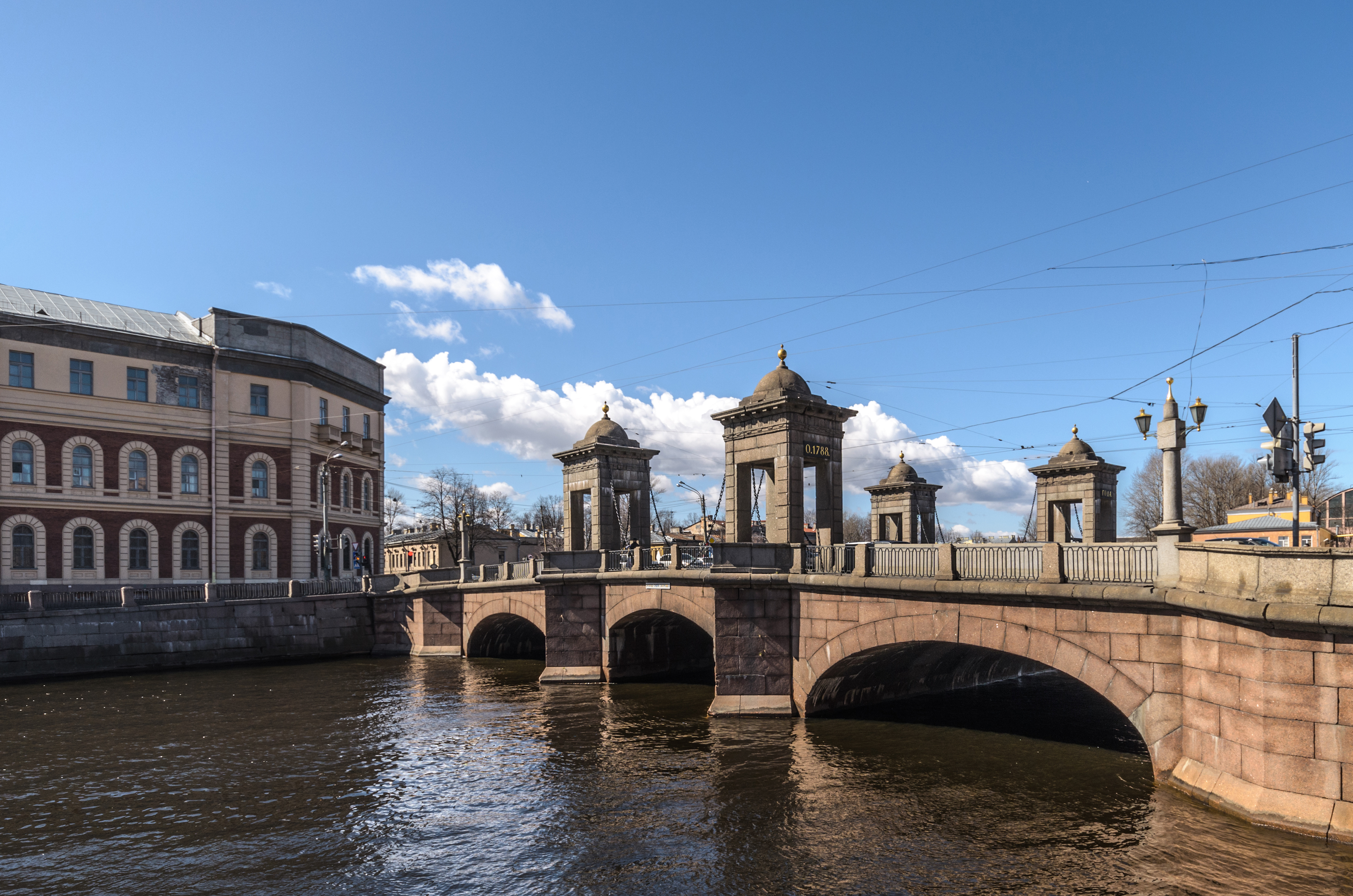
- Coordinates: 59°54′59″N 30°16′46″E
- Crosses: Fontanka River
- Locale: Admiralteysky District of Saint Petersburg

Characteristics
- Total length: 65.6 m
- Width: 30.8 m
- Traversable?: automotive, tram, pedestrian

History
- Opening: 1733 (wooden)

Location
- Interactive map of Staro-Kalinkin Bridge

Staro-Kalinkin Bridge is a bridge across the Fontanka River in Admiralteysky District, Saint Petersburg. It connects Kolomensky and Bezymyany Islands. Along with Lomonosov Bridge it is one of 7 stone three-span bridges across the Fontanka built in the 1780s, which have survived to this day.

== Location ==
The bridge is at the mouth of the Fontanka River. From the left bank, the following are approaches to the bridge: Staro-Peterhof Avenue, Tsiolkovsky Street (near the bridge on the Fontanka Embankment). Repin Square and Lotsmanskaya Street are on the right bank. Traffic flows from Sadovaya Street to the bridge along the Fontanka River embankment.

Upstream is the English Bridge, and below is the Galerny Bridge.

The nearest metro station (1.7 km) is Narvskaya.

== Name ==
The bridge got its name from the name of the nearby Kalinkina Village (a small Finnish village well-known since the 17th century). During its existence, the bridge has repeatedly changed its name: "Kalinkovsky Bridge" (1755), "Kalinkinsky Bridge" (1758–1875), "Kalinkin Bridge" (1763–1867). Since 1820, after the appearance of the Malo-Kalinkin Bridge across the Ekaterininsky Canal (now called the Griboyedov Canal), they began to call it "Bolshoi Kalinkin." The modern name in the form of "Old Kalinkin Bridge" appeared in 1873, since the bridge was on the same highway with Novo-Kalinkin Bridge across the Obvodny Canal. The Staro-Kalinkin Bridge variant has been well-known since 1907.

== History ==
Since 1733, there was a wooden multi-span drawbridge thrown over two branches of the Fontanka River and the Glukhaya River ( Krivushu River). The length of the bridge reached 250 m. In 1786 – 1788, the bridge was rebuilt according to model designs of St. Petersburg bridges across the Fontanka. The project was adapted by engineers Jan Pieter van Suchtelen and Ivan Kondratyevich Gerard.

The bridge was almost indistinguishable from other tower bridges across the Fontanka: the drawbridge was made of wood and consisted of two panels opened by a simple chain mechanism. There were four granite towers topped with cornice and domes. A contemporary of the Staro-Kalinkin bridge, artist Karl Friedrich Knappé depicted the form of the crossing in his artwork (the painting is now kept in The State Hermitage Museum collection). From the picture, it is possible to identify the date of the construction of the Staro-Kalinkin bridge. In addition, it is clear that the sidewalks were separated from the roadway by granite barriers, that on four sides at the entrances to the bridge there were granite obelisks with lanterns suspended from them, and that granite benches were pressed to the parapets at the openings of the structures. In the drawings of 1839, the middle span is depicted as a constant, strut system.

In 1877, to lay the line for the horse tram in the middle span, new trusses were made from beams with struts. In 1882, over the side stone arches of the bridge, wooden decks were arranged along the girders to reduce pressure on the arches. Four granite pedestals with pillars and granite parapets were removed.

In the late 1880s the need arose to expand the bridge for an increase in carrying capacity. In 1889, the City Council approved the bridge reconstruction project, developed by the architect M. I. Ryllo. The project included the demolition of the towers, the replacement of the middle wooden span with a brick vault, and the expansion of the bridge. This decision led to sharp protests from the architectural community of St. Petersburg and the Committee for the reconstruction of bridges was forced to abandon its intentions, instructing the architect to draw up a new project. According to the second project of Mikhail Ivanovich Ryllo, the bridge towers were preserved, but all other elements of the bridge decoration (sidewalk railing, obelisks with lanterns, and granite benches) were removed. 22 March 1890 highest permission was granted to rebuild the bridge, while maintaining the existing granite towers. The new project was approved by the City Council in June 1890, and according to the project, from 1892 to 1893 the middle span was rebuilt. Separate stages of work were covered by the magazine "Nedelya Stroitelya" (Builder's Week). In the course of the reconstruction work, the abutments and the piers of the bridge were dismantled to the level of the pile grillage, and then restored again. The arches of the side spans were rebuilt in their historical form, and the central span was covered with a gentle circular arch that replaced the existing wooden truss. The granite towers were recreated, while the new width of the bridge structure was 15.2 m.

From 1907 to 1909, for the construction of the tram line the bridge was expanded to 30.75 m by building two new bridges on the sides of the old bridge, 9.6 m wide on the upper side and 5.9 m from the lower side of the old bridge. The new spans repeated the outlines of the vaults and the system of the old bridge, i.e. three-span stone vaults, the middle span was 8.77 m and the side spans were 13.16 m each. At the same time, granite towers and parapets were preserved. The work was carried out by the contractor S.S. Linda.

In 1965, at the initiative of "Lenmostotresta" a project was developed to restore the architectural design of the bridge. The author of the project was architect Irina Nikolaevna Benua. The project was based on the historical information compiled by Special Scientific Restoration Workshops employee R. G. Rabinovich, based on the archival materials collected by N. V. Popova. One of the sources of the general view of the crossing in the 19th century was Karl Friedrich Knappe's 1840 painting "Kalinkin Bridge." As a result of restoration work, granite barriers have been restored, separating the roadway from the sidewalk; granite benches on the parapets of the bridge openings were restored, and granite obelisks with lanterns were installed near the entrances. In 1969, gilding of metal decorative parts of the bridge was done. In 1989, according to the project of the architect V.M. Ivanov, the lanterns and memorial plaques on the towers were recreated.

From October 2013 to April 2014 repairs were made to the bridge's road surface, tram rails and communications.

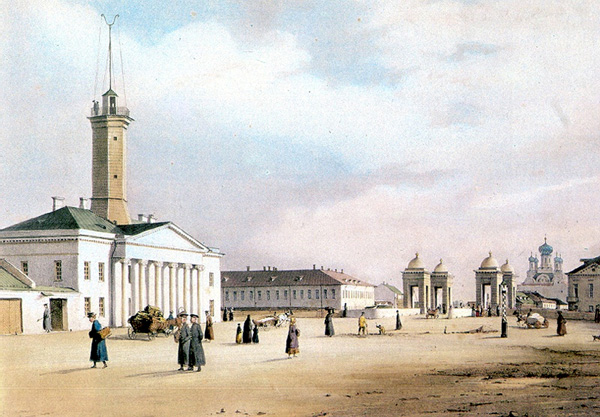
Nikanor Chernetsov. Kalinkin Bridge. 1840.

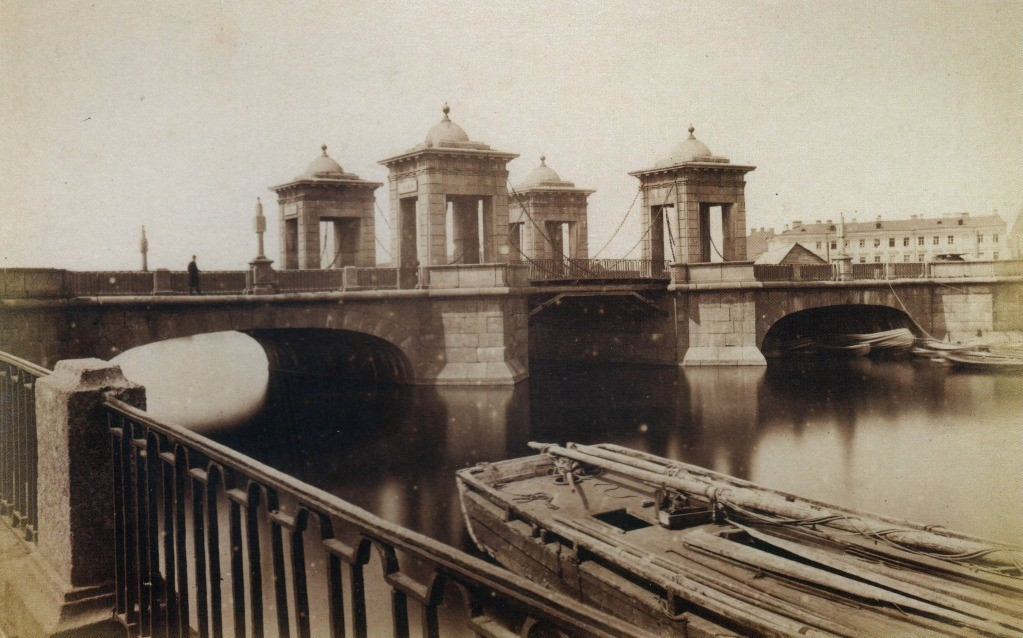
Bridge in 1880. The central wooden span of the strut system is visible.

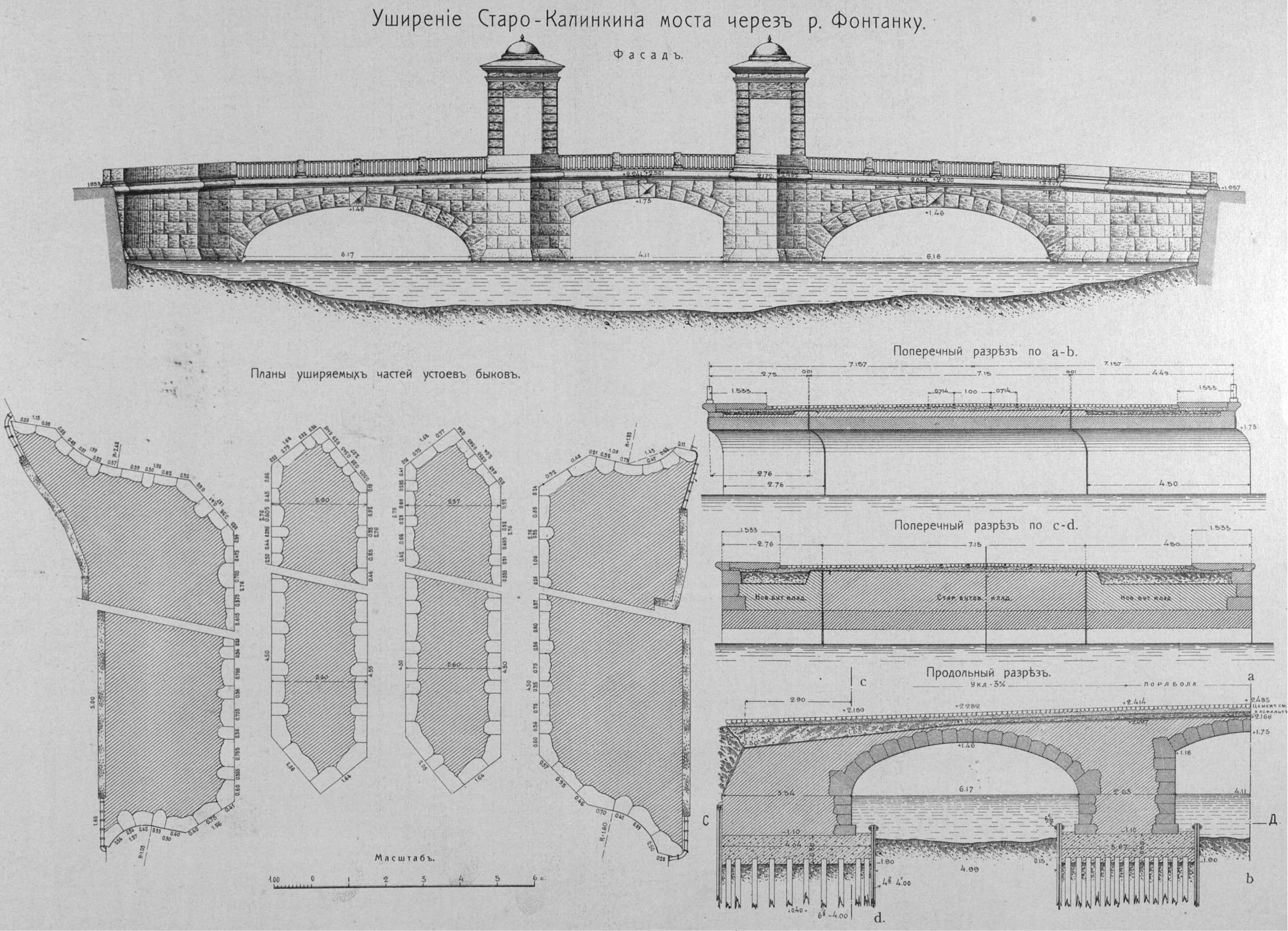
Bridge widening project. 1907.

== Construction ==
The bridge is three-span. The side spans are the same size and are covered with box-shaped stone vaults, the middle span is covered with a gentle circular arch. The total bridge width is 30.8 m, including roadway which is 23.39 m and sidewalks that are 3.3 m each. The length along the alignment between the embankments is 65.6 m.

The bridge is intended for the movement of trams, vehicles and pedestrians. The carriageway of the bridge includes 4 lanes for traffic and 2 tram lines. The roadway is covered with asphalt concrete, and the sidewalks are covered with granite slabs. The railing of the bridge is similar to the railing of the embankment. It has metal sections installed between the granite sections. At the entrances to the bridge, there are four granite obelisks with faceted lanterns. The sidewalks are separated from the roadway by high granite barriers that end at the entrances to the bridge.

Tower structures are made in the form of open pavilions. These consist of rustic columns that support doric entablatures and are completed with spherical domes that are further topped with spherical gilded urns. On the granite towers, memorial plaques are installed, indicating the dates of the beginning and end of the construction of the bridge: "1786" (on the left bank) and "1788" (on the right bank).

== Sources ==
- Bunin, M. S. (1986). Мосты Ленинграда. Очерки истории и архитектуры мостов Петербурга — Петрограда — Ленинграда [Bridges of Leningrad. Essays on the history and architecture of bridges in St. Petersburg – Petrograd – Leningrad] (in Russian). Leningrad: Stroyizdat.
- Novikov, Yu. V. (1991). Мосты и набережные Ленинграда [Bridges and Embankments of Leningrad] (in Russian). Leningrad: Lenizdat.
- Tumilovich, E. V.; Altunin, S. E. (1963). Мосты и набережные Ленинграда. Альбом [Bridges and embankments of Leningrad. Album] (in Russian). Moscow: Publishing house of the Ministry of Communal Services of the RSFSR.
