= Aeroflot Flight 366 =

1963 aircraft water landing

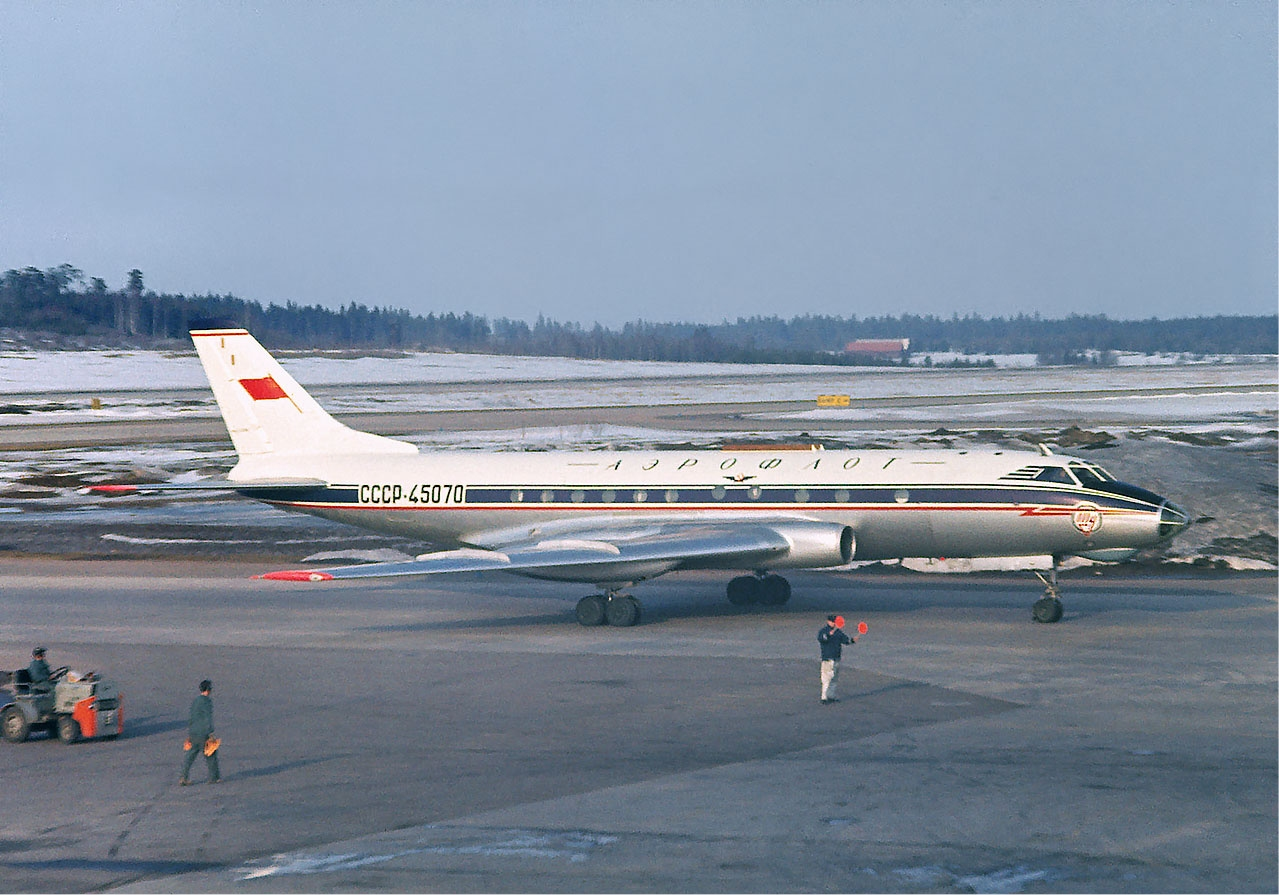
- A Tu-124 similar to the accident aircraft

Accident
- Date: 21 August 1963
- Summary: Fuel exhaustion due to pilot error and maintenance error
- Site: Neva River Leningrad, Russian SFSR, Soviet Union; 59°55′11″N 30°24′13″E

Aircraft
- Aircraft type: Tupolev Tu-124
- Operator: Aeroflot
- IATA flight No.: SU366
- ICAO flight No.: AFL366
- Call sign: AEROFLOT 366
- Registration: CCCP-45021
- Flight origin: Tallinn-Ülemiste Airport, Tallinn, Estonian SSR, Soviet Union
- Destination: Moskva-Vnukovo Airport, Moscow, Russian SFSR, Soviet Union
- Occupants: 52
- Passengers: 45
- Crew: 7
- Fatalities: 0
- Survivors: 52

Aeroflot Flight 366, also known as the Miracle on the Neva, was a water landing by a Tupolev Tu-124 of the Soviet state airline Aeroflot (Moscow division). The aircraft took off from Tallinn-Ülemiste Airport at 08:55 local time on 21 August 1963 with 45 passengers and 7 crew on board. The aircraft was scheduled to fly to Moskva–Vnukovo. After takeoff, the nose gear did not retract. Ground control diverted the flight to Leningrad because of fog at Tallinn.

== Background ==
=== Aircraft ===
The aircraft involved in the accident was a one year old Tupolev Tu-124, registered as CCCP-45021, being built in 1962. It also had the manufacturing number of 2350701.

== Accident ==
At 10:00 local time, Flight 366 started to circle the city at 450 m (1,500 ft), in order to use fuel, reducing weight and decreasing the risk of fire in the event of a crash. The ground services at Pulkovo Airport (LED) were preparing the dirt runway for the landing. Each circuit around the city took the aircraft approximately 15 minutes. During this time the crew attempted to force the nose gear to lock into the fully extended position by pushing it with a pole taken from the cloak closet.

On the eighth and last circuit while 20 km (12 mi) from the airport, the no. 1 engine flamed out due to fuel starvation. The remaining engine ceased shortly thereafter, with the aircraft above the city center, traveling east over St. Isaac's Cathedral and the Admiralty. Upon loss of power the flight crew ditched the aircraft in the 300-metre (1,000 ft) wide Neva River.

External image
- Photo of the plane ditched on the riverbank

Eyewitnesses saw Flight 366 upstream. Immediately after a turn, the aircraft glided over the high steel structures of the Bolsheokhtinsky Bridge with approximately 30 m (100 ft) of clearance. The Tu-124 flew over the Alexander Nevsky Bridge – under construction at the time – barely missing it. The pilot managed to land the aircraft on the river, in close proximity to an 1898-built steam tugboat.

The plane began to fill with water. The captain of the tugboat saw the plane in distress and went to help. He and his crew broke the aircraft's windshield to tie a cable to the cockpit's control wheel and proceeded to tow the craft to the river bank. During the tow all passengers remained on board. Passengers and crew then evacuated the cabin via an access hatch on the plane's roof.

== See also ==
- List of airline flights that required gliding
- US Airways Flight 1549
