= Blue Bridge (Saint Petersburg) =

Bridge in Saint Petersburg, Russia

Coordinates: 59.9316°N 30.3089°E

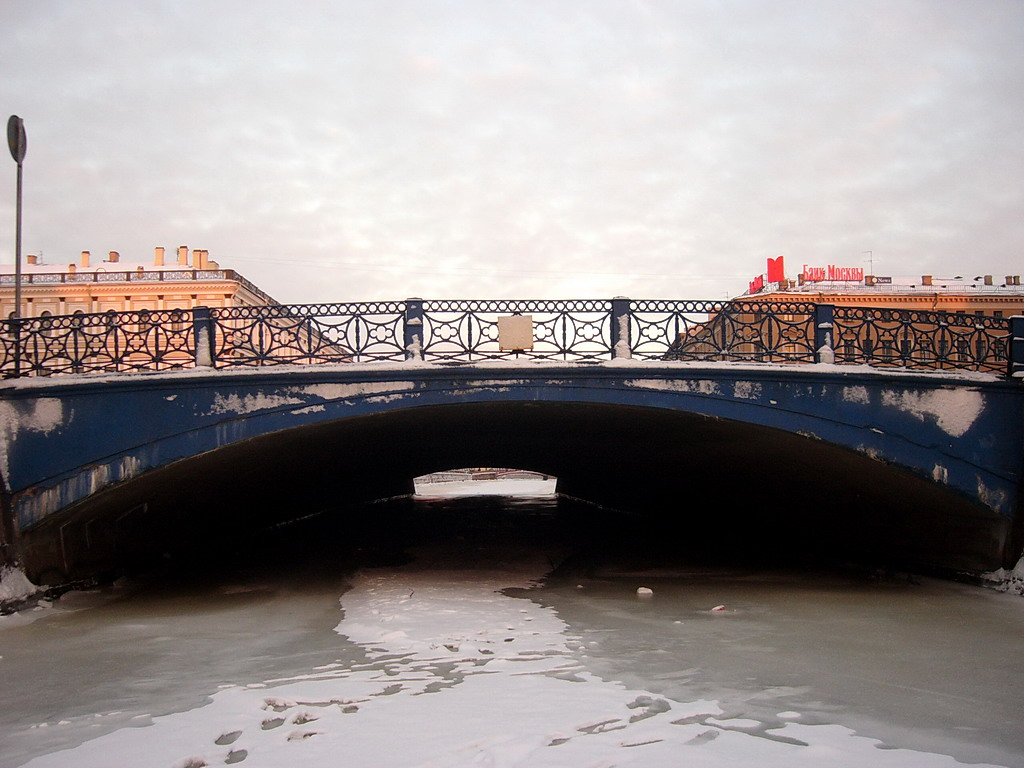
The Blue Bridge is the widest bridge in Saint Petersburg.

The Blue Bridge (Russian: Си́ний мост, Siniy most) is a 97.3-metre-wide (319 ft) bridge that spans the Moika River in Saint Petersburg, Russia. The Blue Bridge is the widest bridge in Saint Petersburg and is sometimes claimed to be the widest bridge in the world – a claim, however, that has not been recognized by international reference works, such as the Guinness World Records.

The Blue Bridge spans the Moika River and is located in front of the Mariinsky Palace at Saint Isaac's Square in city's historic centre. The first cast iron bridge on the site was designed in 1805 by the architect William Heste, and built in 1818. This bridge was a single-span bridge resting on stone supports, and measured 41 metres across. In 1842–1844, the bridge was widened on its northern side to its present width of 97.3 metres - just as wide as the adjacent Isaac's Square. Soon after the bridge was widened, there were rumours that the new width of the bridge was 99.9 metres instead of the actual 97.3. This rumour even made it into some official booklets and textbooks. Today, most of the Blue Bridge serves as a parking lot.

The bridge's name dates from a 19th-century tradition of color-coding the bridges crossing the Moika River. Like other colored bridges, the Blue Bridge got its name from the color of its sides facing the river. Today only four colored bridges survive, the other ones being the Red Bridge, the Green Bridge and the Yellow Bridge. Three of them have kept their original names, while Yellow Bridge has been renamed to Pevchesky Bridge.

== See also ==
- List of bridges in Saint Petersburg
