= Pevchesky Bridge =

Bridge over the Moika River in St. Petersburg, Russia

Coordinates: 59.9401°N 30.3193°E

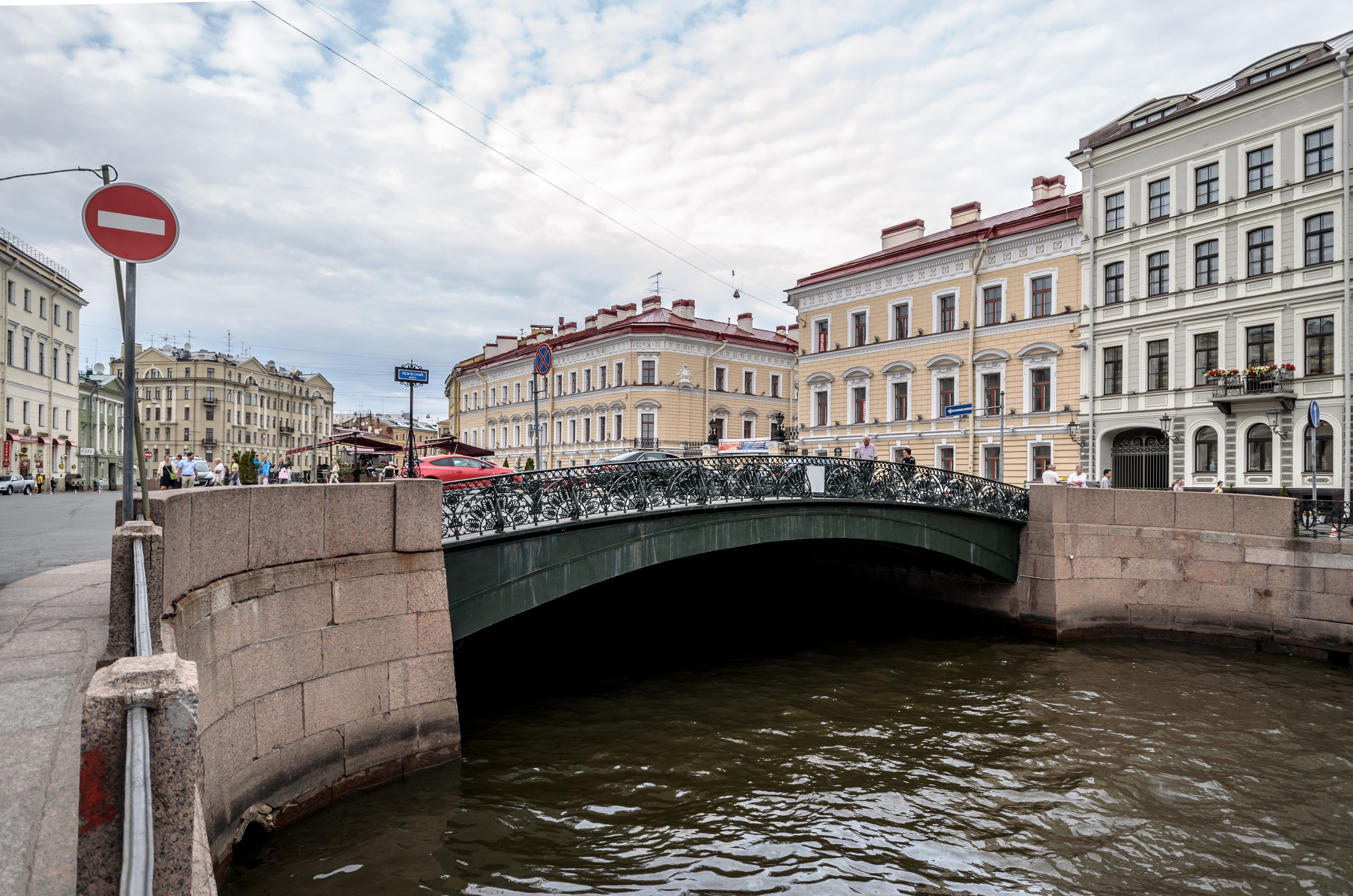
Pevchesky Bridge

The Pevchesky Bridge (Russian: Пе́вческий мост; literally Singers' Bridge), also known as the Choristers' Bridge or Yellow Bridge (Жёлтый Мост, Zhyolty Most), is a single-span bridge across the Moika River in Saint Petersburg, Russia. The bridge is a part of the Palace Square. The length of the bridge is 21 metres, and the width is 72 metres. It is the third-widest bridge in Saint Petersburg, after the Blue Bridge and Kazansky Bridge. Before the February Revolution, the term "Choristers' Bridge" was shorthand for the tsarist foreign ministry, just as the French foreign ministry is known as the Quai d'Orsay.

The first wooden bridge on the site was designed by the French architect Auguste de Montferrand; it was inaugurated in 1834. The first pedestrians to cross the bridge were the troops marching to the parade celebrating the unveiling of the Alexander Column (also designed by Montferrand). The bridge got the name Yellow from the color of the railings, and according to the tradition of color-coding the bridges crossing the Moika River (that already had the Blue Bridge, the Green Bridge and the Red Bridge).

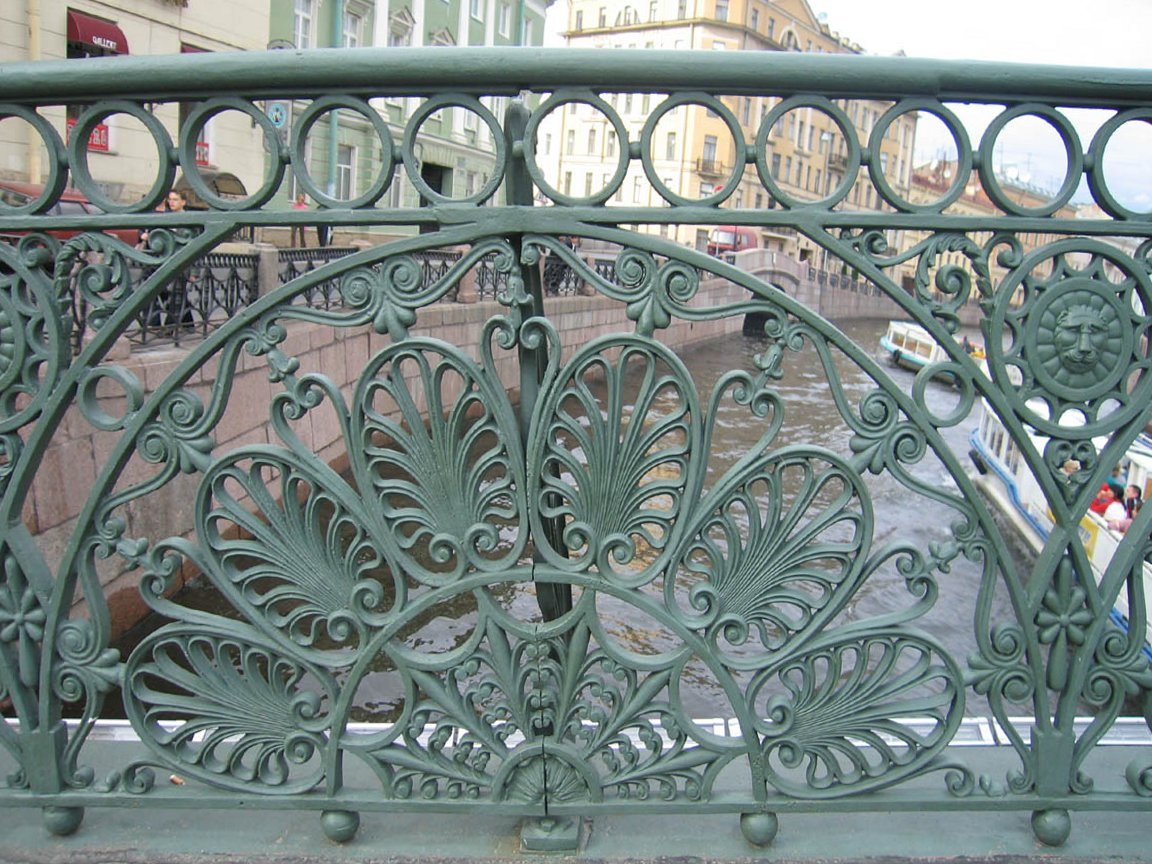
Detail of the railings

In 1837, Georg von Cancrin, an imperial minister of finance, proposed to replace the wooden bridge with a much wider cast iron structure. According to legend, Emperor Nicholas I himself chose the location for the bridge. Across the river from the Winter Palace was located the house of Count Yury Alexandrovich Golovkin. Once, Golovkin was in such a hurry to meet the Emperor, that he stepped from the boat transporting him across the Moyka and nearly drowned. Thus, Nicholas stated to Golvkin that he specifically located the bridge close to Golovkin's house, so as not to repeat the accident.

The new bridge was designed by architects Vasily Stasov, Domenico Adamini, and engineer E.A. Adam. The bridge was opened on 24 October 1840. The first user of the bridge was Nicholas I himself, who solemnly crossed the new bridge in his horse-drawn coach. The main decoration of the bridge are beautiful cast iron railings, with numerous frills, the main repeating elements being fan-like palmettos.

Later, the bridge got the name Pevchesky (literally Singers' bridge), because the Saint Petersburg Court Capella was accommodated nearby. In 1937, the rose-colored paving stones of the bridge were replaced by bitumen. In 2004, the companies Lenmoststroy and Intarsiya undertook restoration works on the bridge.

== See also ==
- List of bridges in Saint Petersburg
