= Sampsonievsky Bridge =

Bridge in St Petersburg, Russia

Coordinates: 59°57′29″N 30°20′15″E

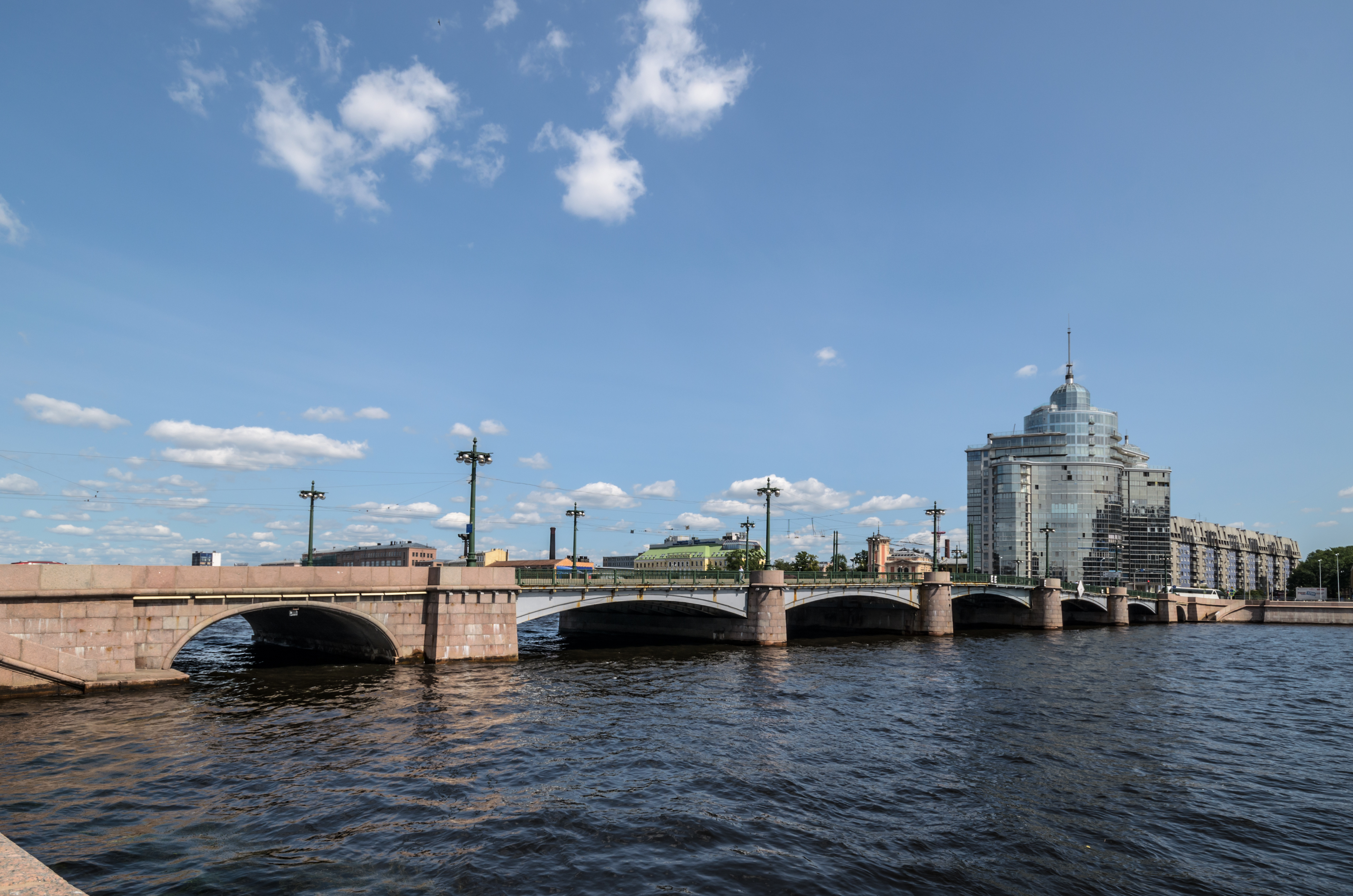
Sampsonievsky Bridge

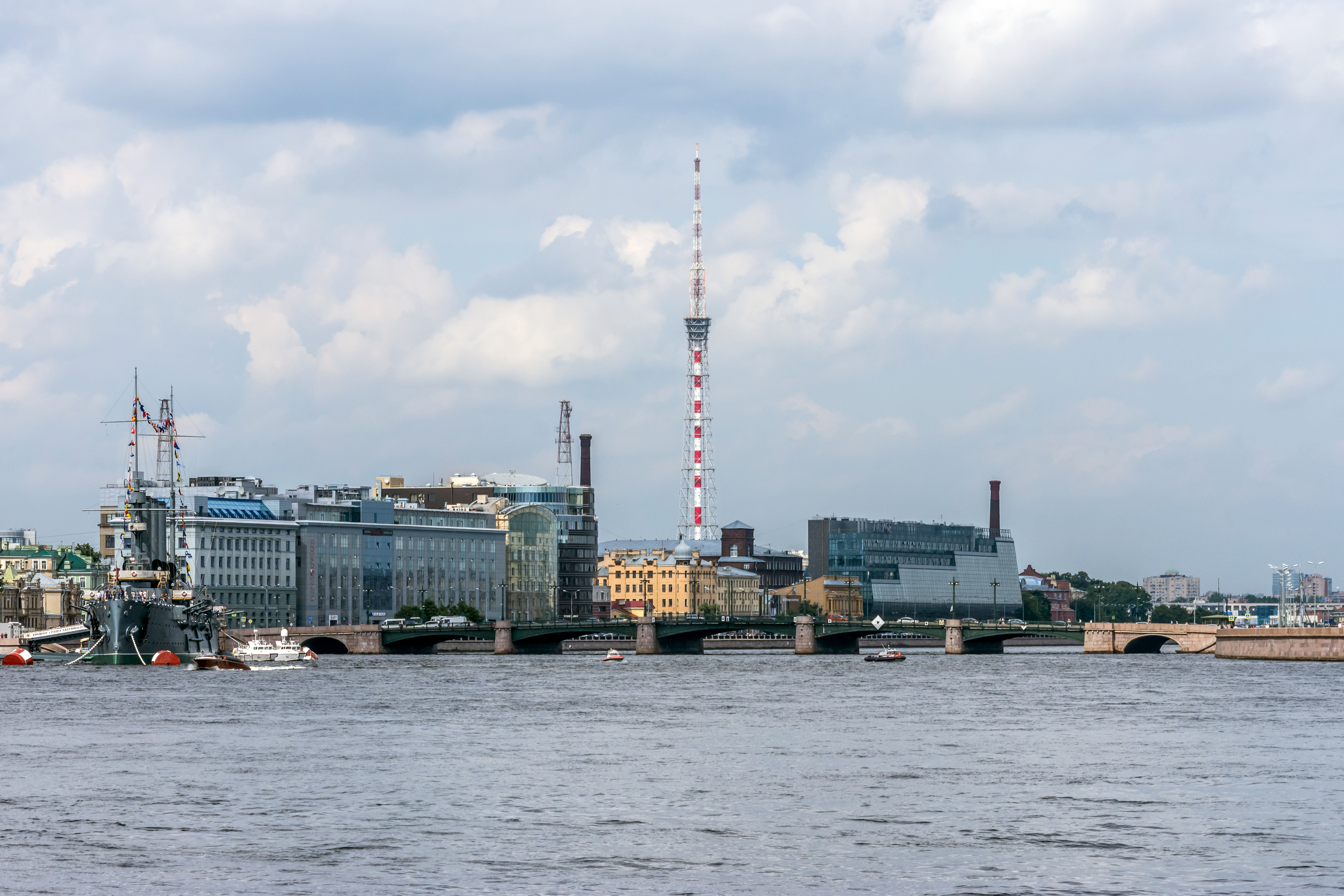
Sampsonievsky Bridge, view from Kutuzov Embankment

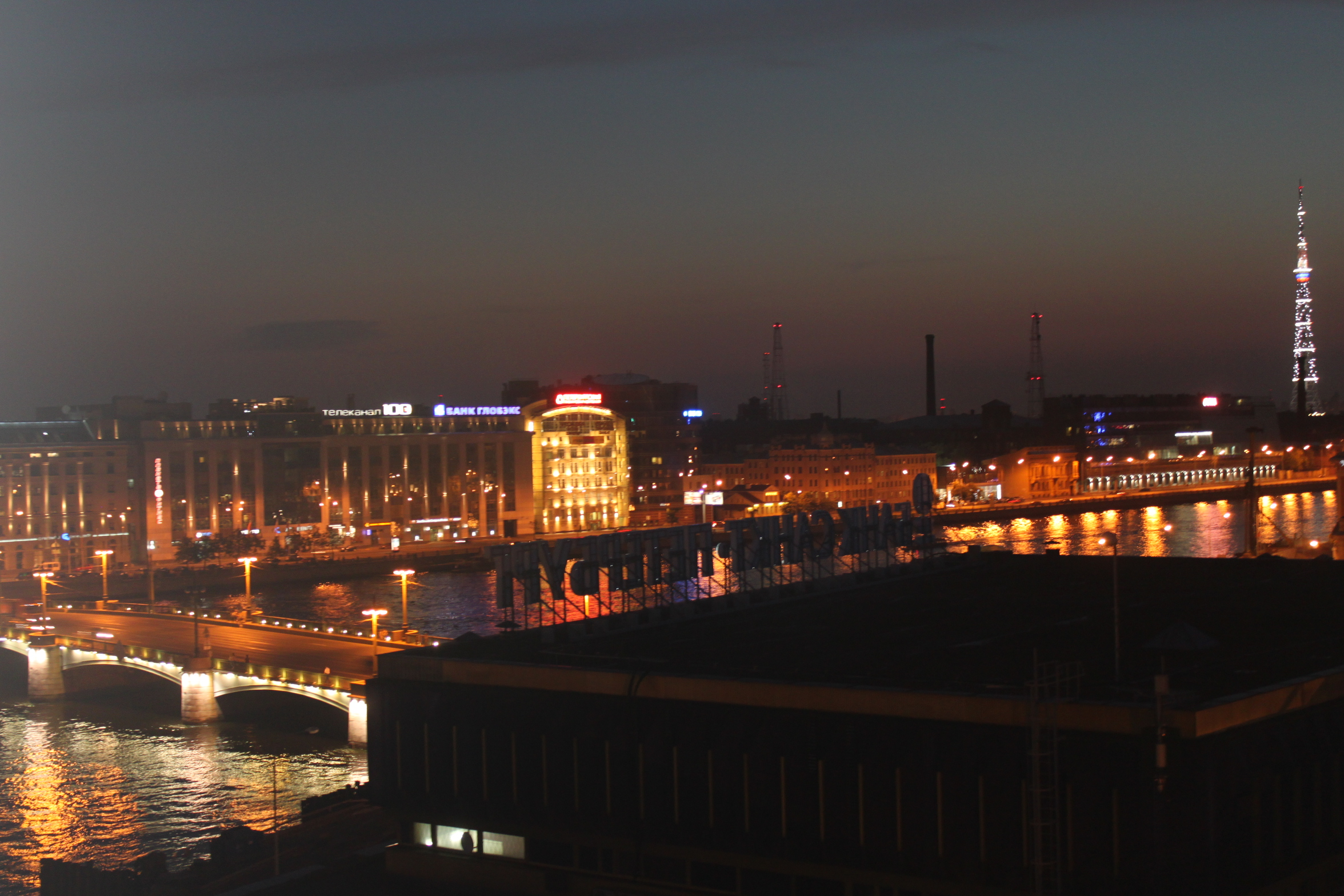
Sampsonievsky Bridge at night

Sampsonievsky Bridge, was also known as Freedom Bridge during the 20th century, is a structure located over the Bolshaya Nevka river, St Petersburg, Russia. It links Kuybysheva Street and Finlandsky Avenue. It was named after St. Sampson’s Cathedral. It is 215 metres long and 27 metres wide.

== History ==
In 1806, a pontoon bridge named Grenadersky bridge was built over the river. In 1847, a wooden bridge was built, and the bridge was rebuilt several times before metal beam spans were laid in 1937. Present-day bridge was built by V.V. Demchenko, B.B. Levin and L.A. Noskov between 1955 and 1958. In year 2000, the bridge was fully renovated.

== Structure ==
It consists of seven spans supported by granite and concrete piers. It is 215 metres long and 27 metres wide.

== See also ==
- List of bridges in Saint Petersburg
