= William Heste =

- Born: 1753 or 1763; Scotland
- Died: 4 June 1832 (aged 78/79 or 68/69); Tsarskoye Selo, Russian Empire

William Hastie (Russian: Василий Иванович Гесте; c. 1753 – 4 June 1832) was a Russian architect, civil engineer and town planner of Scottish descent. His name is also transliterated back from Russian as William Heste or, seldom, Vasily Heste. Because of his influence at court Heste's designs for buildings and whole towns can be seen throughout Russia.

== Biography ==
William Hastie was born in either 1753 or 1763 in Scotland. (A service roll from the year 1822 gives Hastie's age as 69, hence 1753, but the Peterburg Necropolis lists him as being born in 1763.) He came to Russia in 1784 with a group of 73 Scottish craftsmen hired in Edinburgh by Charles Cameron to work on construction sites in Tsarskoe Selo. Hastie and his compatriot Adam Menelaws made the most distinguished careers among this group, becoming notable professional architects.

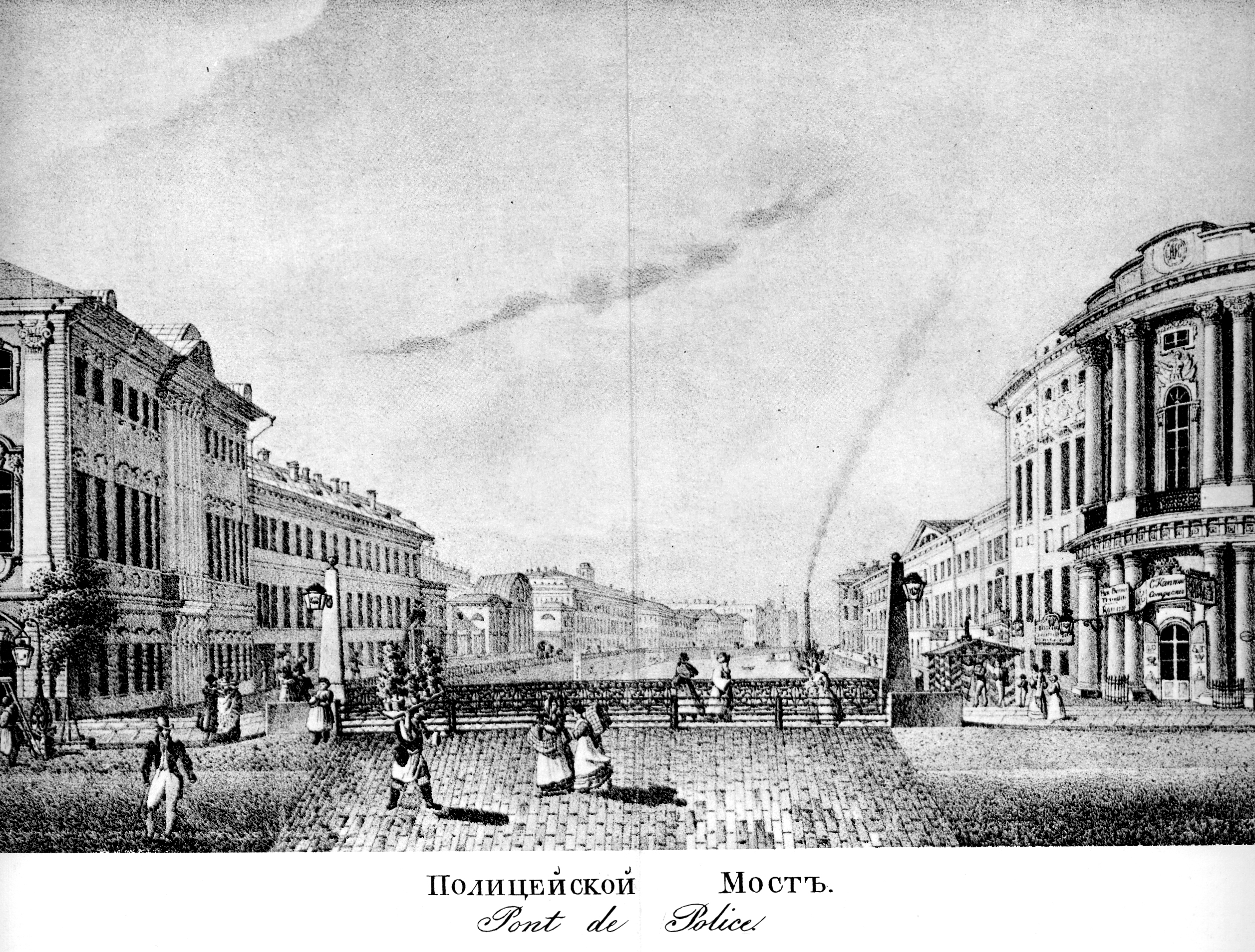
The Police Bridge (Green bridge) over the Moyka River opened on 14 November 1806

Hastie never returned to Scotland, and instead in 1792 he entered the service of the Russian Imperial Chancellery, designing model buildings for mass construction. In July 1795 he joined the Yekaterinoslav Governorate administration as its chief architect; in particular, in the Crimea Hastie surveyed the Bakhchisaray Palace and other Tatar and Greek relics. Hastie left the southern provinces in June 1799, but returned to their architecture in the 1810s, producing a master plan for the redevelopment of Yekaterinoslav, which was approved in 1817 and generally followed throughout the 19th century.

After serving in Yekaterinoslav Governorate, he came back to Saint Petersburg in 1803, and joined Charles Gascoigne as his assistant on the construction site of the Izhorsky Zavod. Hastie is credited with designing and erecting the plant's administrative building and, together with Gascoigne, with building the dam across the Izhora River. Here Hastie acquired practical skills in metalworking and bridge engineering.

In February 1805 Hastie returned to Saint Petersburg and was assigned to building bridges over the city's smaller rivers. He built the Blue, Green, Red and Potseluev bridges. They were the first in Saint Petersburg to be made from cast iron. From 1808 to 1832 Hastie was the head architect of Tsarskoye Selo. He created a general plan for construction in the town. From 1810 Hastie was involved in most urban construction projects in Russia.

After the 1812 fire of Moscow which destroyed three quarters of the city Hastie was the first to propose a detailed redevelopment plan. It rejected for disregarding the historical background of the city.

William Hastie died on 4 June 1832 in Tsarskoye Selo, where he was buried in a Protestant cemetery.

== Bibliography ==
- "Гести, Василий Иванович" . Brockhaus and Efron Encyclopedic Dictionary (in Russian). 1906.
- Korshunova, Miliza & Haskell, Larissa (1974). "William Hastie in Russia". Architectural History. 17. Oxford: 14–21, 53–56. doi:10.2307/1568342. JSTOR 1568342. S2CID 194968689.
- Cross, Anthony Glenn (1997). By the Banks of the Neva: Chapters from the Lives and Careers of the British in Eighteenth-century Russia. Cambridge University Press. ISBN 978-0-521-55293-6.
- Architects of Tsarskoe Selo (in Russian)
- Heste on the site 300 years of St. Petersburg (in Russian)
- Kuznetsov, S. O. (1998). "Adam Menelas na rossiyskoy zemle (Адам Менелас на российской земле. Возможные пути интерпретации творчества архитектора императора Николая I)" (PDF) (in Russian). The Philosophical Age. Almanac 6. Russia at the Time of Nicholas I: Science, Politics, Enlightenment. Ed. by T. Khartanovich, M. Mikeshin. St. Petersburg, 1998.
- Shvidkovsky, Dmitry (1996). The Empress & the Architect: British Architecture and Gardens at the Court of Catherine the Great. Yale University Press. ISBN 978-0-300-06564-0. (biography of Charles Cameron)
