= Bolsheokhtinsky Bridge =

Bridge in Saint Petersburg, Russia

Bolsheokhtinsky Bridge Большеохтинский мост
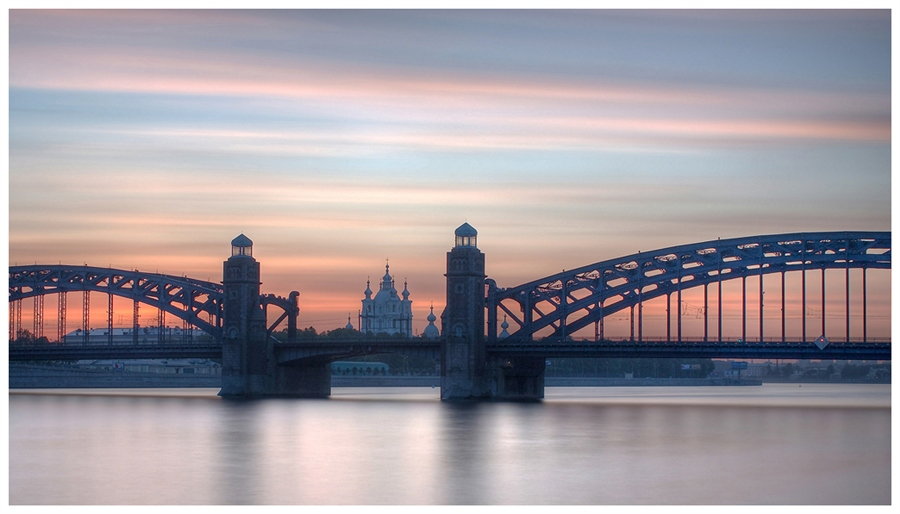
- Coordinates: 59°56′33.65″N 30°24′5.51″E
- Carries: 4 lanes of roadway
- Crosses: Neva River
- Locale: Saint Petersburg

Characteristics
- Design: Through arch bridge

History
- Opened: 1909, June 26

Location
- Interactive map of Bolsheokhtinsky Bridge; Большеохтинский мост

Bolsheokhtinsky Bridge (Russian: Большеохтинский мост, before 1917 Peter the Great Bridge, Russian: Мост Петра́ Вели́кого, Most Petra Velikogo; from 1917 to 1956 - Bolsheokhtensky Bridge, Russian: Большеохтенский мост; also known as Okhtinsky Bridge, Russian: Охтинский мост) is a bridge across the Neva River in Saint Petersburg, Russia. The bridge's length is 334 meters, the width is 23 meters. The bridge features three spans; the central one can be drawn.

== History ==
The initial idea to build a bridge near the Okhta river was circulated in 1829. Even before the Saint Petersburg was founded, there were settlements in the Okhta region, and with the growth of the city, it quickly grew to become big industrial center. Powder factories and shipyards existed here. However, in the 19th century, Okhta district wasn't officially part of Saint Petersburg. The bridge was essential for the developing industry, and Nicholas I approved the bridge as part of strategic city development plan. However, at that time the necessary funds were not found.

Next time the possibility of building a bridge was raised in 1860-th, when the Emperor approved the decision to join the Okhta district to Saint Petersburg. The city Duma organized international contest. There were total of 16 projects submitted including projects from France, Germany, Austria, Spain and United States. There also were three projects submitted out of contest. And one of these out of contest projects was declared winner. That was the project by professor of Nikolaevskay engineering academy colonel Krivoshein and military engineer Apyshkov. But even after selecting the winning project, the work didn't start for a long time.

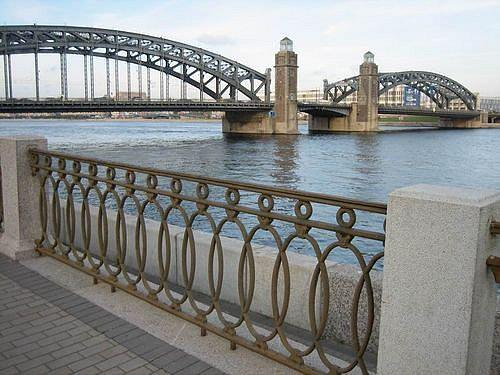
The 100-year-old bridge in 2012.

In spring of 1907, the passenger ship Arkhangelk which transported people from the left bank of Neva to the right bank sank. This tragic event set things in motion, and on September 24, 1907 the contract for building the bridge was signed. The ceremony of bridge founding took place on June 26, 1909, exactly two hundred years from the Battle of Poltava. Hence the bridge was named after the victor of that battle: Emperor Peter the Great Bridge.

As the result, the bridge itself was manufactured in Warsaw (Firma Braci Ruckich - Rucki Bros. Metalworks in Warsaw), and components were transported to the construction site and assembled. This is described by the bronze plaque (120 cm by 180 cm) that can be seen from the pedestrian walkway on the right pylon if crossing from the left side of Neva.

The bridge was open for traffic on October 26, 1911. In 1956 the bridge was renamed Bolsheokhtinsky after the Big Okhta river, but in 2004 the original name was partially restored, although the title of Emperor was dropped from the name. Today people call this bridge both Peter the Great Bridge and Bolsheokhtinsky Bridge.

The city rumor has it that one of the clenches in the bridge is made from pure gold, and colored to be the same color as the rest of clenches. Unfortunately it is virtually impossible to verify, since the bridge has more than one million clenches.

In 1963, an Aeroflot Tupolev Tu-124 landed on the Neva just behind the bridge in what remains one of the very few successful controlled water landings in aviation history with no lives lost.

== See also ==
- List of bridges in Saint Petersburg
