= Exchange Bridge =

Bascule bridge in Saint Petersburg, Russia

Coordinates: 59°56′47″N 30°18′12″E

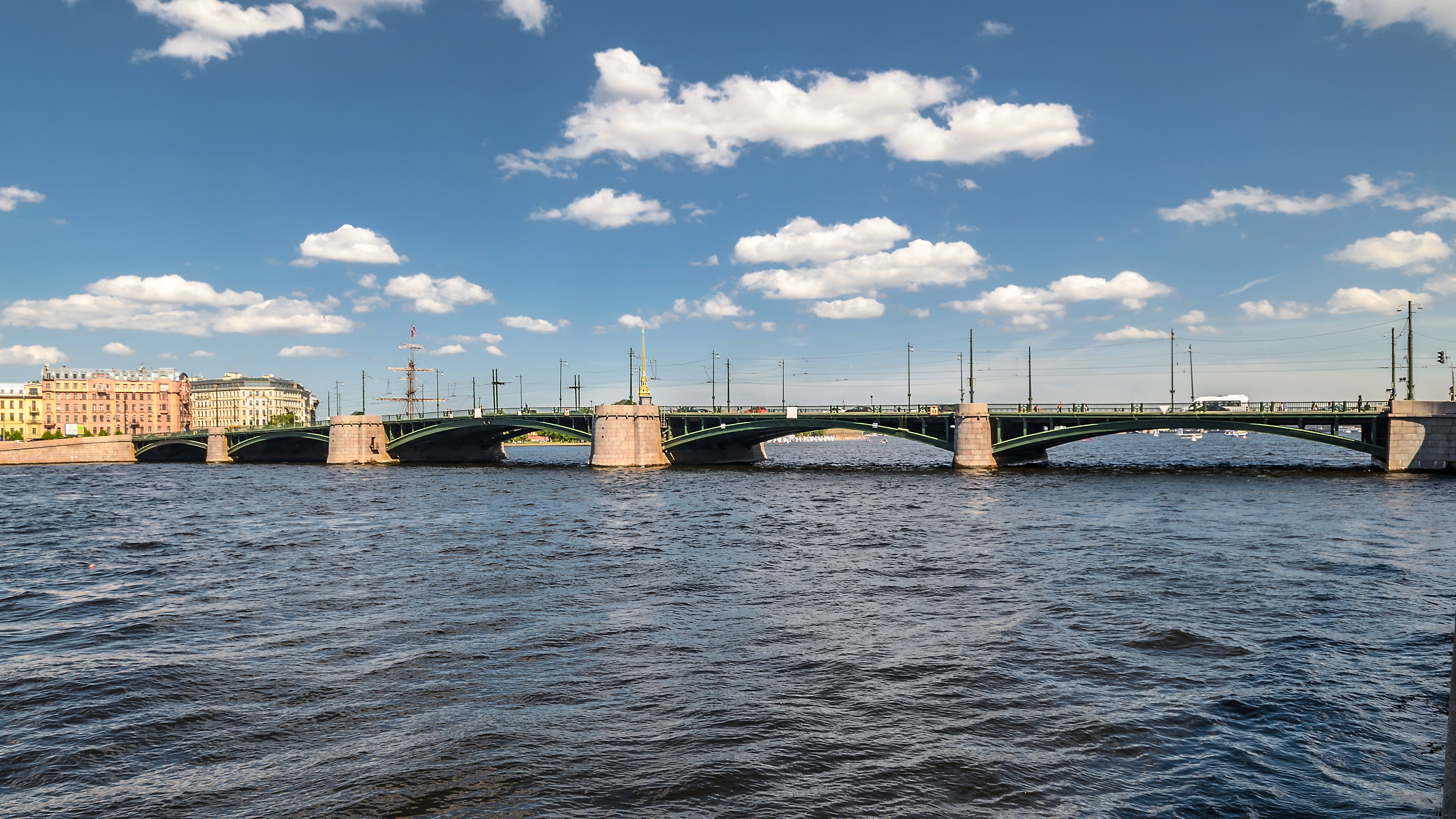
Exchange Bridge

Exchange Bridge (Russian: Биржево́й мост, Birzhevoy most) is a bascule bridge in Saint Petersburg, opened in 1894. The bridge crosses the Little Neva River (distributary of Neva River) close to the Exchange Square and connects the Vasilyevsky and Petrogradsky islands.

It takes its name from the Old Saint Petersburg Stock Exchange (also Bourse, Russian: Биржа) located nearby.

The closest metro station is Sportivnaya.

== Timeline ==
- 1894 - the original wooden bridge was built
- 1922 - the bridge was renamed to Builders' Bridge
- 1956 - major reconstruction
- 1989 - the bridge was renamed back to Exchange Bridge

== See also ==
- List of bridges in Saint Petersburg

== Sources ==
- St. Petersburg encyclopedia
