= Red Bridge (Saint Petersburg) =

Bridge in Saint Petersburg, Russia

Coordinates: 59.9331°N 30.3152°E

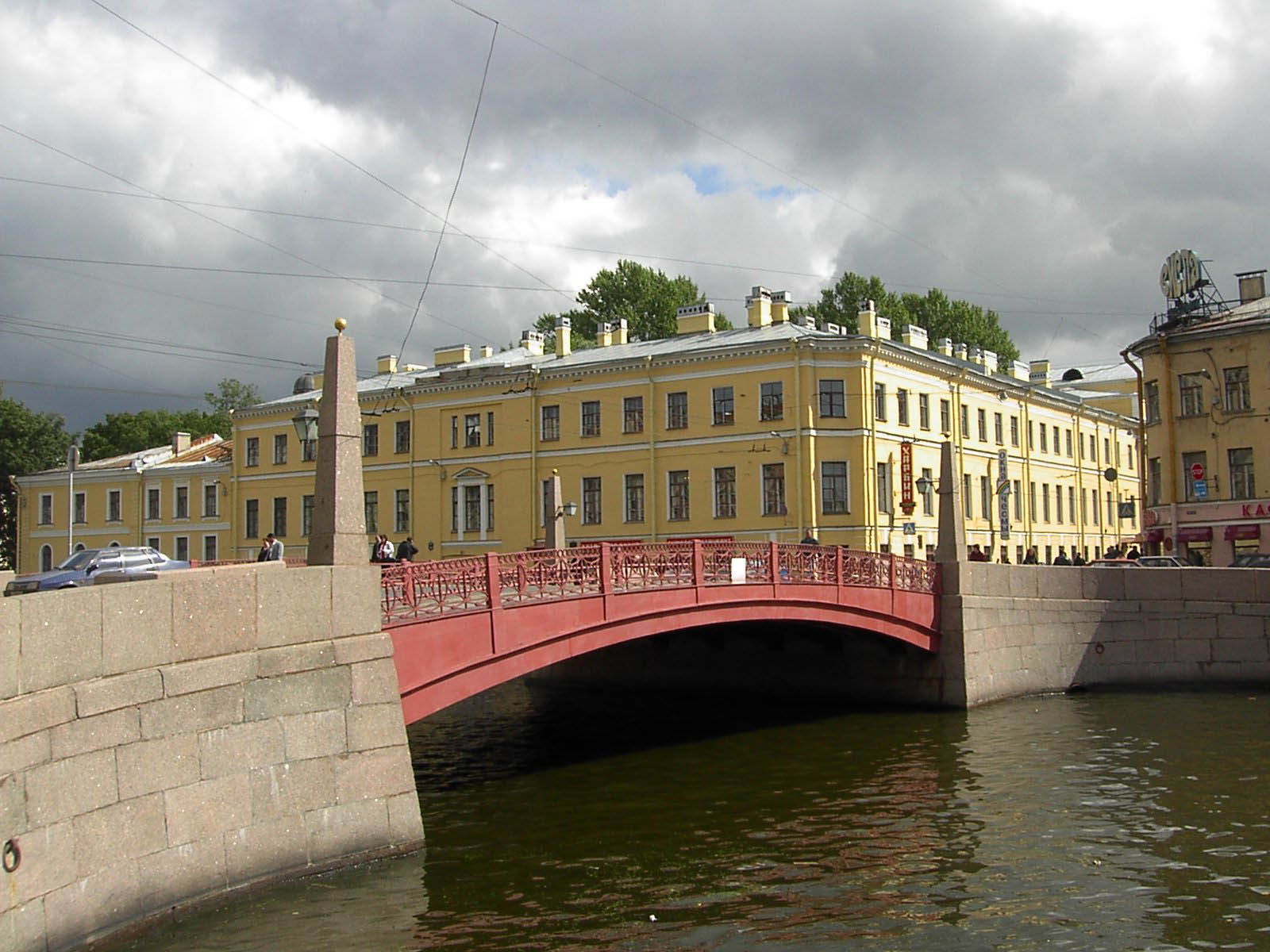
Red Bridge

The Red Bridge (Russian: Кра́сный мост, Krasniy most), is a single-span bridge across the Moika River in Saint Petersburg, Russia. The bridge is a part of Gorokhovaya Street. The length of the bridge is 42 m; the width is 16.8 m.

The first cast iron bridge on the site was designed and built in 1808-1813 to a design by William Heste. The bridge was rebuilt in 1953 by architect V.V. Blazhevich. The original cast iron structure of the bridge was replaced by the welded steel arches but most of the decorations are left intact.

The bridge's name dates from a 19th-century tradition of color-coding the bridges crossing the Moika River. Like other colored bridges, the Red Bridge got its name from the colour of its sides facing the river. Today only four colored bridges survive, the other ones being the Blue Bridge, the Green Bridge and the Yellow Bridge respectively. Three of them have kept their original names, but Yellow Bridge has been renamed to Pevchesky Bridge.

== See also ==
- Bridges in Saint Petersburg
- List of bridges in Saint Petersburg
