= Italian Bridge =

Bridge in Saint Petersburg, Russia

Italian Bridge Итальянский мост
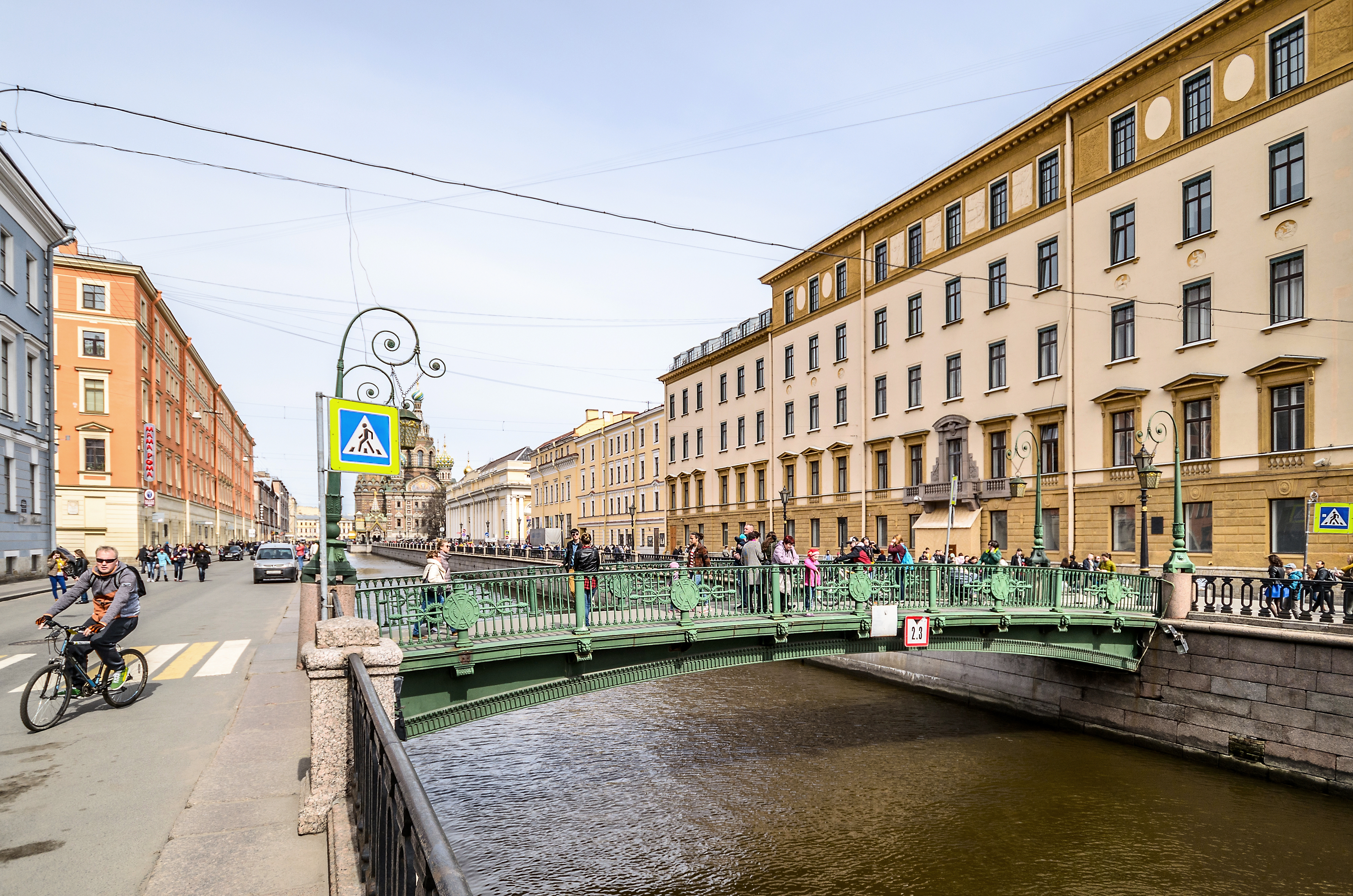
- Italian bridge, upstream view, 2015
- Coordinates: 59°56′14″N 30°19′37″E
- Crosses: Griboyedov Canal
- Locale: Saint Petersburg

Characteristics
- Design: Arch Bridge
- Total length: 22.5 m (74 ft)
- Width: 3 m (9.8 ft)

History
- Opened: 1896 (wooden), 1968

Location
- Interactive map of Italian Bridge; Итальянский мост

The Italian Bridge (Russian: Итальянский мост) is a 22.5 m (74 ft) long and 3 m (9.8 ft) wide single-span beam pedestrian bridge crossing the Griboyedov Canal in Saint Petersburg, Russia. It connects Kazansky Island and Spassky Island in the city's Tsentralny District. The bridge takes its name from Italyanskaya Street.

== History ==
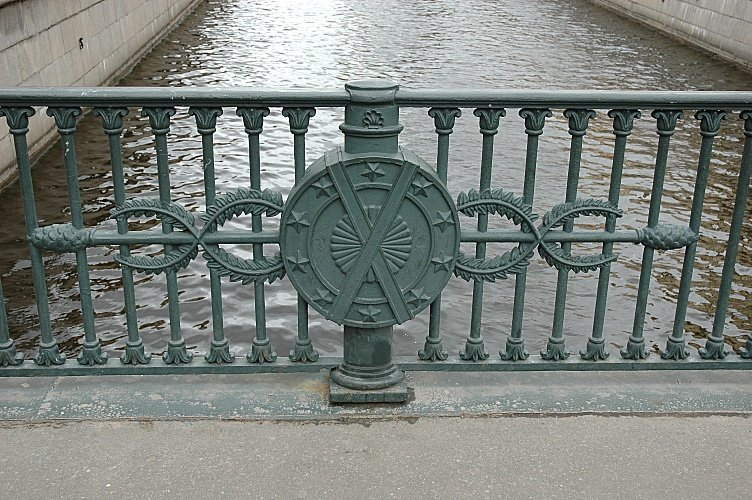
Italian bridge railing

The bridge was built in 1896 in the place of a boat ferry as a single span wooden bridge which connected Bolshaya and Malaya Italyanskaya Streets. Railway engineer Leonid N. Kolpitsyn proposed building a bridge across the canal, but as the city authorities declined to endorse the project, he built it at his own expense. The novelty at the time was use of xilolit plates as a paving material. The bridge opened to pedestrians on 6 October 1896, at a cost of 3,500 rubles. The city authorities expressed gratitude, but refused to reimburse the construction costs, and also rejected his proposal of introducing a toll of 1 kopeck per person. Kolpitsyn ultimately donated the bridge to the city.

In 1902 the bridge was rebuilt for the first time, the xylolite slabs replaced with plank decking, overseen by Karl Baldi. In 1911-1912 it was rebuilt again, with the trusses replaced with a timber strut structure, under the supervision of engineer K. V. Yefimyev. In 1912, the trusses were replaced with a timber strut structure. In 1937, it was rebuilt as a pedestrian heat-conducting bridge with two thermal pipes, and rebuilt in 1955 with a steel beam superstructure with elaborate decorations. In 1996, the "Venetian" lanterns and railing were restored. The bridge has the status of an object of regional significance on the Russian cultural heritage register.
