= Alexander Nevsky Bridge =

Road bridge in St Petersburg, Russia

Coordinates: 59°55′32″N 30°23′43″E

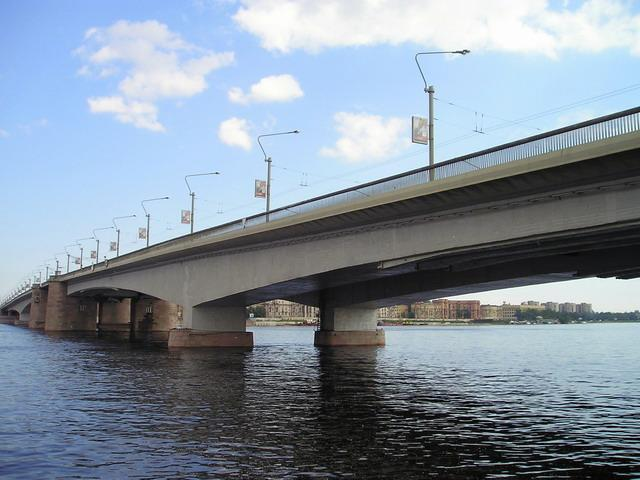
Alexander Nevsky Bridge

The Alexander Nevsky Bridge (Russian: Мост Алекса́ндра Не́вского, Most Aleksandra Nevskogo) in St Petersburg, Russia is named after the legendary Russian military commander and politician Alexander Nevsky. The bridge connects Alexander Nevsky Square and Zanevsky prospect thus linking the southern and the northern parts of the city. Until 2004, when the Big Obukhovsky Bridge was built, the Alexander Nevsky Bridge was the longest bridge across the Neva River in Saint Petersburg. Its length is 906 meters (2,972 ft), and it is 35 meters (115 ft) wide.

The bridge was built from 1960 to 1965 under the working name of Old Neva Bridge (Russian: Старо-Не́вский мост). Designed by the group of architects A. Zhuk, S. Mayofis and Y. Sinitsa, the bridge has complemented the look of adjacent buildings in the surrounding area. The project was led by a team of engineers of the "Lengiprotransmost" institute. Proof-testing was done by means of a column of army tanks. On November 5, 1965 (61 years ago), the bridge was open for traffic.

== Summer navigation ==
For the period of summer navigation a number of bridges on the rivers of Saint-Petersburg including the Alexander Nevsky Bridge are opened to allow ships to pass. The bridge consists of seven bridge spans and the central span of 50 meters (160 ft) can be opened in two minutes.

== See also ==
- List of bridges in Saint Petersburg
