= Kanonersky Tunnel =

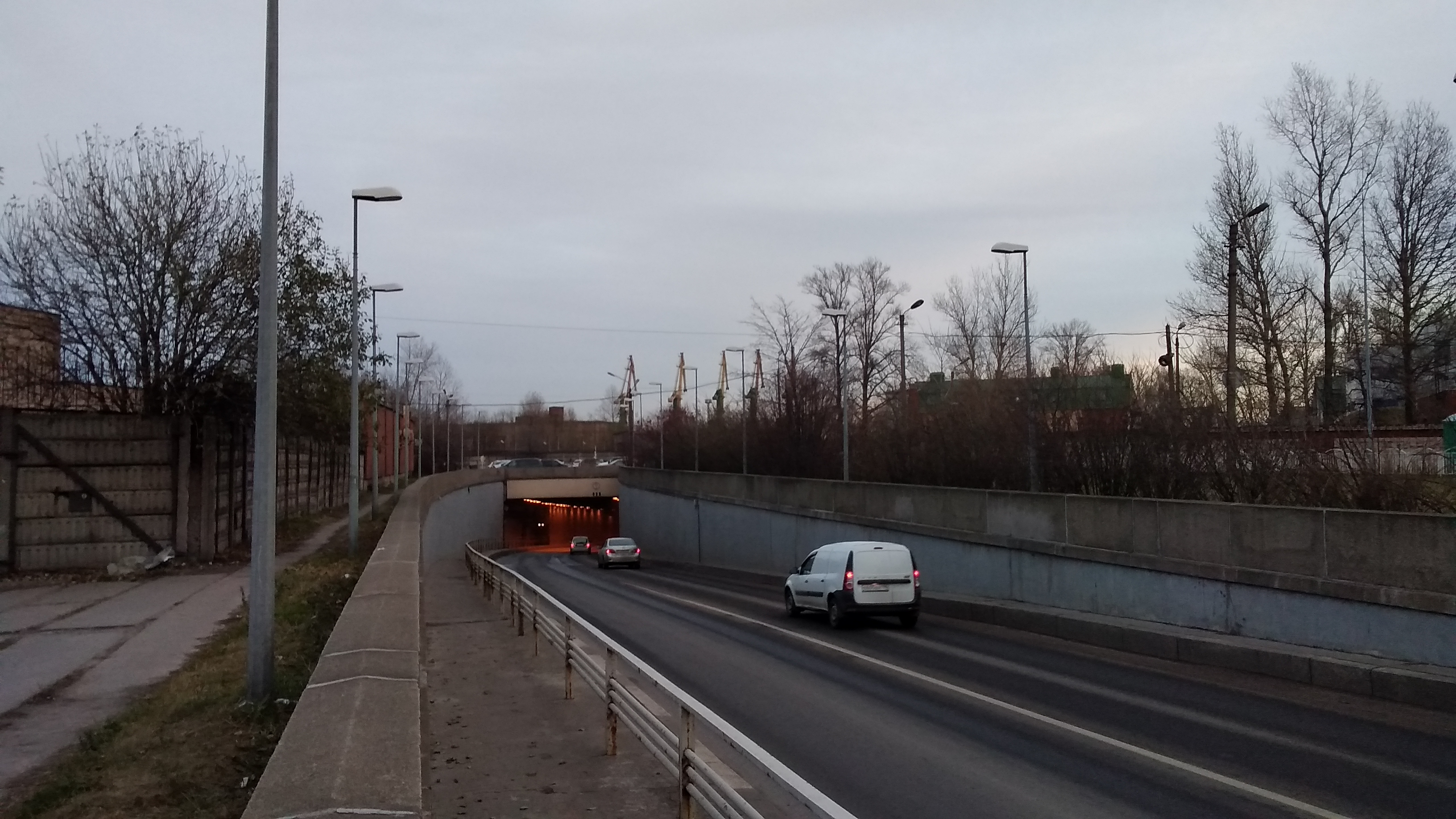
- Island's entrance
- Interactive map of Kanonersky Tunnel

Overview
- Location: Kirovsky District of Saint-Petersburg, Russia
- Coordinates: 59°54′13″N 30°13′28″E
- Start: Dvinskaya street of Gutuevsky Iseland
- End: Kanonersky Island

Operation
- Work began: 1970
- Constructed: 1975-1983
- Opened: 29 July 1983
- Owner: Saint Petersburg City Administration
- Operator: SUE "Mostotrest"
- Traffic: Automotive
- Character: City automobile movement
- Vehicles per day: 1500

Technical
- Length: 927 metres (3,041 ft), 647 metres (2,123 ft) (between portals)
- No. of lanes: One in each part
- Operating speed: 60 kilometres per hour (37 mph)
- Tunnel clearance: 9.05 metres (29.7 ft)
- Width: 13.3 metres (44 ft)

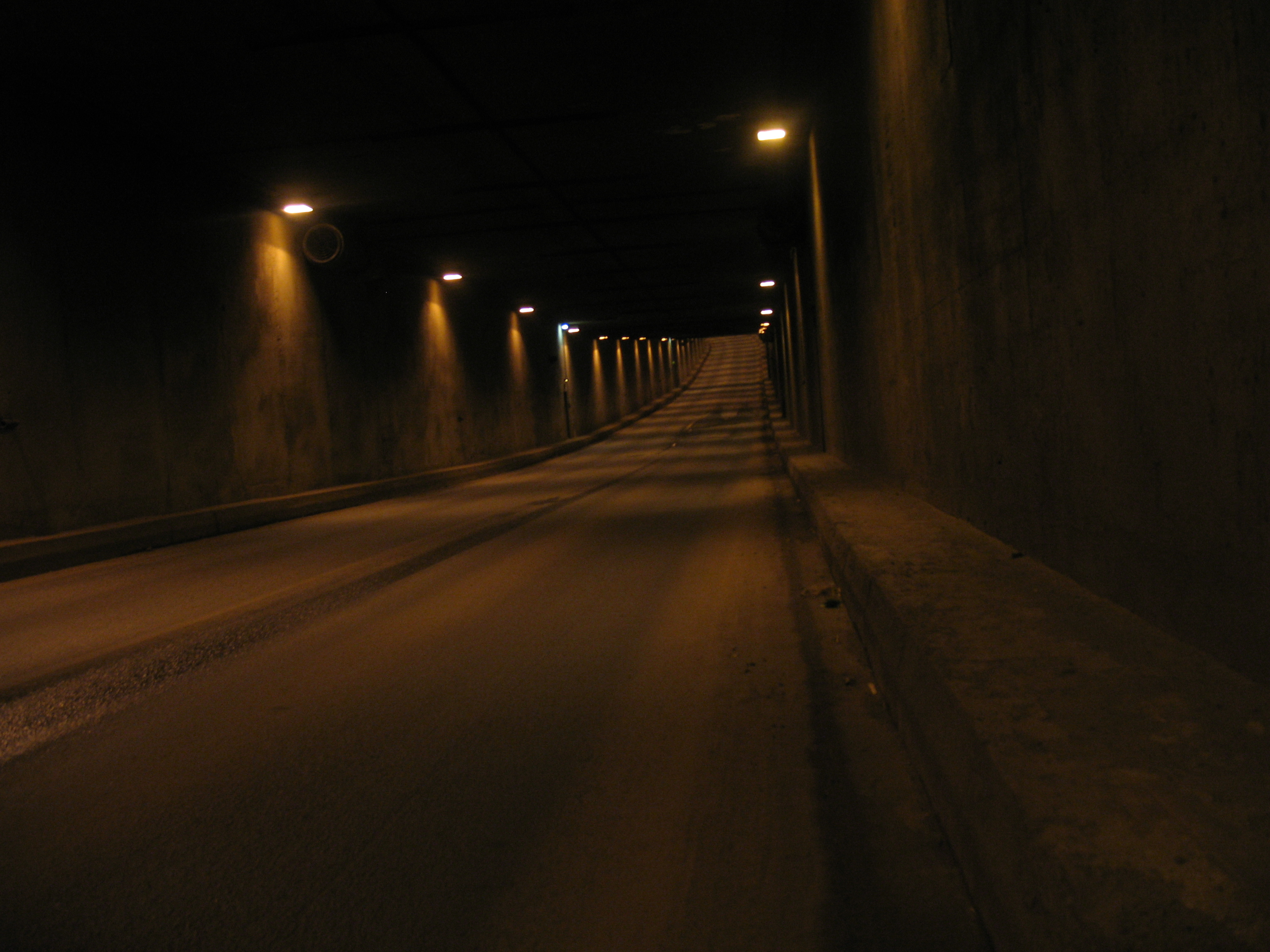
Underwater part

Kanonersky Tunnel (Russian: Канонерский тоннель) is a tunnel under the Sea Canal in the Kirovsky District of Saint Petersburg. The tunnel provides a link between Kanonersky Island and Dvinskaya Street on Gutuevsky Island.

The tunnel was constructed in 1983 by using Immersed tube method.

== History and backgrounds ==
Kanonersky Island is an artificial island in Saint-Petersburg. It was built as consequence of building Sea Canal to further deepening of Neva Bay. By expansion of industrial area of St. Petersburg, it became home to large shipbuilding enterprises. Transport consisted of ferries or private boats using icebreakers during winter. Thus connecting this industrial island to the mainland was suggested either by bridge or tunnel, and a tunnel was preferred.

== Construction ==
For the construction of Kanonersky Tunnel, several scientific institutes were involved for design and feasibility studies such as Lengiprotrans, LENMORNIIPROEKT, SKB Glavmostostroy, Research Institute of Transport Construction, PGUPS, MIIT, Metrogiprotrans, Moscow State University of Environmental Engineering. The tunnel project was prepared by Lengiprotrans while the building work was carried out by Giprostroymost. Geodetic maintenance of the building was assigned to the PGUPS.

The Tunnel was built using a sunken tube or immersed tube method. The main part consists of five identical prefabricated reinforced concrete sections. Each length is 75 metres (246 ft), width 13.3 metres (44 ft), height 8.05 metres (26.4 ft), weight about 8,000 tonnes (8,800 short tons). The structure is made of monolithic reinforced concrete with a thickness of the tray, walls and floors of 0.93 m of buried sections – The length of the site dipping sections totalled 375 metres (1,230 ft).

For the building of the sections on the bank of the Sea Canal, the original dock-sluice was constructed. After sluicing the created sections, the end faces were closed by metal partitions. They were counterbalanced by water and transported along the Sea Canal to the place of immersion. They were then joined to an earlier established section, forming a uniform design. For the control of the immersion, divers worked underwater.

The full length of the tunnel was 927 metres (3,041 ft). The tunnel has two lanes and a footpath. Along with cables for electrical supply and communication; water supply and central heating pipes connect Kanonersky Island with the city.

== Operation ==
Due to nature of Immersed tube method, constant monitoring and repairing has been needed. The first maintenance period was carried out between 1997 and 2002. Lighting, ventilation systems were replaced, and three drainage pumps were installed. In 2004, Lengiprotrans, one of the principal contractors, carried out repair work. In 2006, there was a mooring damaged over the tunnel; from it the tunnel was also damaged. At the end of June 2009, tunnel repair was again required, after it was determined that the drainage systems needed a replacement. The most recent maintenance was carried out in December 2017, at the cost of 127 million rubles.

Operating speed limit has been a key for longevity and maintenance of the tunnel. A new toll road, the central section of which is still under construction, will provide a north–south corridor over the island.
