= English Bridge (Saint Petersburg) =

Pedestrian bridge in Saint Petersburg, Russia

English Bridge Английский мост
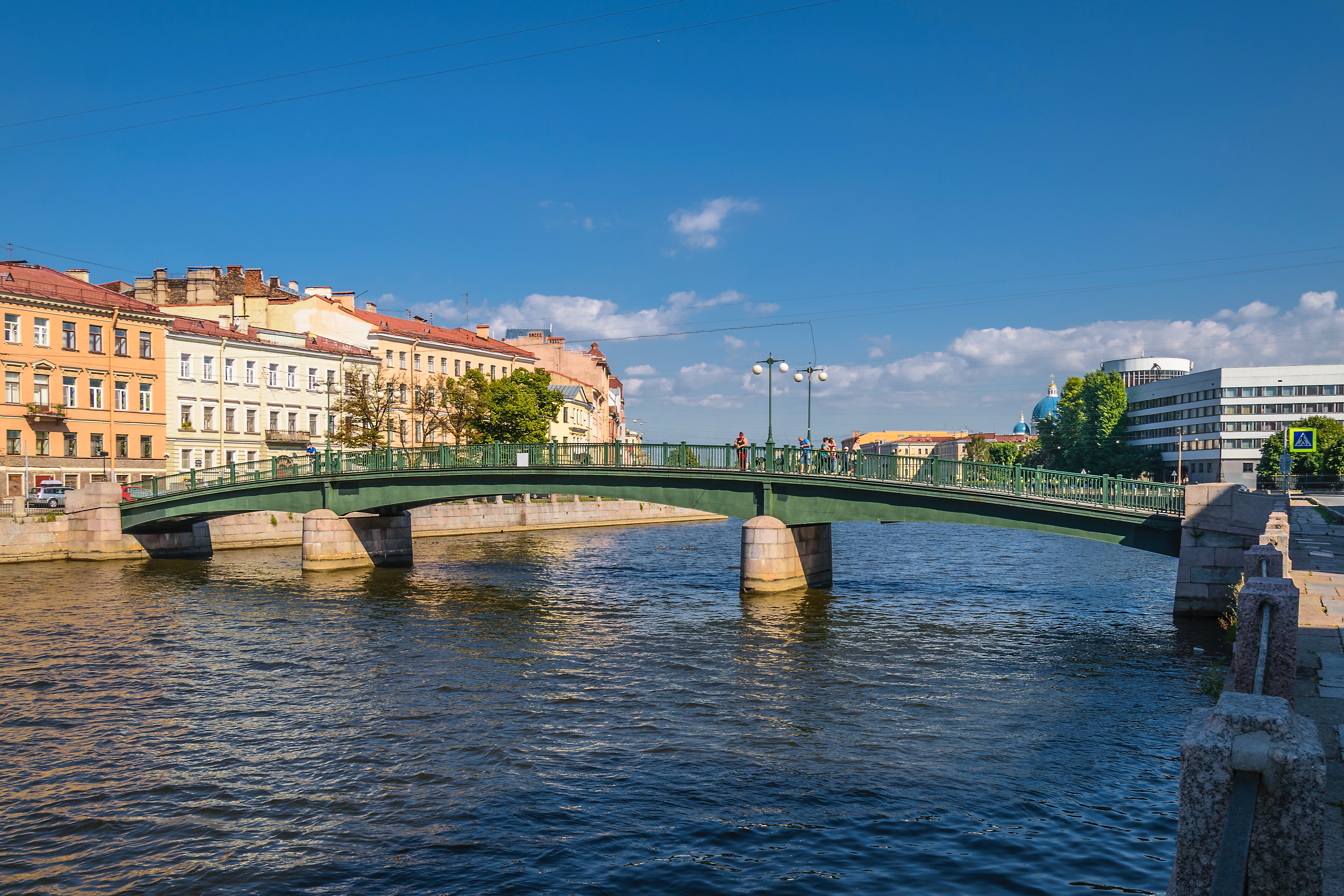
- Coordinates: 59°54′57″N 30°17′28″E
- Carries: Pedestrian
- Crosses: Fontanka River
- Locale: Saint Petersburg

Characteristics
- Design: Arch Bridge
- Total length: 60.8 m
- Width: 4.7 m

History
- Opened: 1910 (wooden), 1963

Location
- Interactive map of English Bridge; Английский мост

English Bridge (Russian: Английский мост) is a pedestrian bridge across Fontanka River connecting Pokrovsky and Anonymous islands in Saint Petersburg, Russia.

== History ==
Five span wooden bridge existed at the location since 1910. It took the traffic load previously carried by Egyptian Bridge after the latter collapsed in 1905.

Modern bridge was built in 1962–1963 to the designs of architects Areshev and Vasilkovsky under the supervision of engineer Kerlikov. The construction is a three span bridge set on ferroconcrete abutments with granite cover. Metal railings have a simple pattern.

The bridge takes its name from the nearby English Prospekt.
