= Lomonosov Bridge =

Bridge in Saint Petersburg, Russia

Coordinates: 59°55′43″N 30°20′08″E

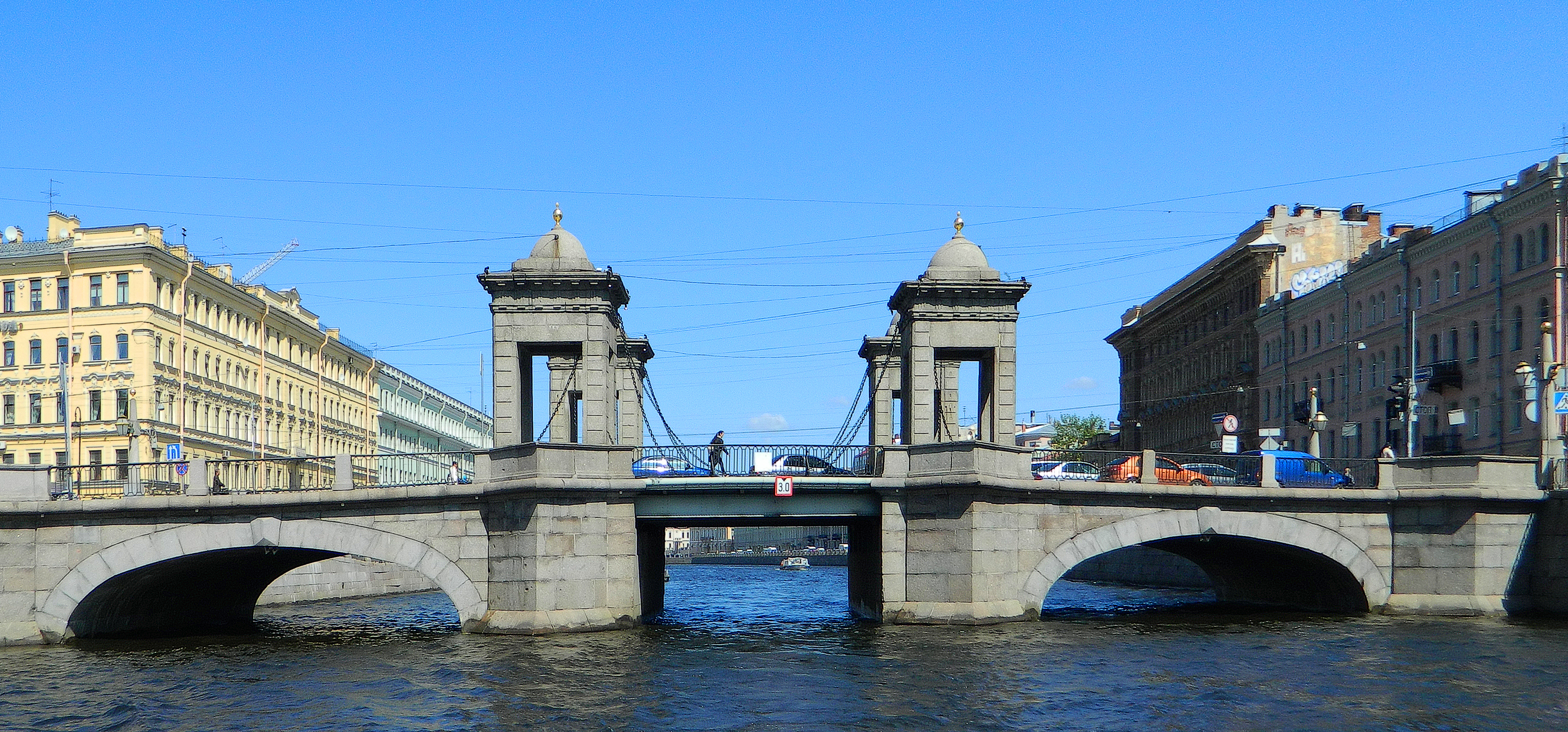
Pavilions

Lomonosov Bridge (Russian: Мост Ломоносова) across the Fontanka River is the best preserved of towered movable bridges that used to be typical for Saint Petersburg in the 18th century.

The original Tchernyshov Bridge, measuring 63 metres long by 14,7 metres wide, was constructed between 1785 and 1787. During the mid-19th century industrialization other bridges had their towers removed to facilitate traffic, but Tchernyshov Bridge retained the original appearance, with four rusticated Doric pavilions with small domed caps. Its movable middle section of wood was replaced by a metal one in 1912. The bridge was renamed after Mikhail Lomonosov in 1948.
