= Egyptian Bridge =

Bridge in Saint Petersburg, Russia

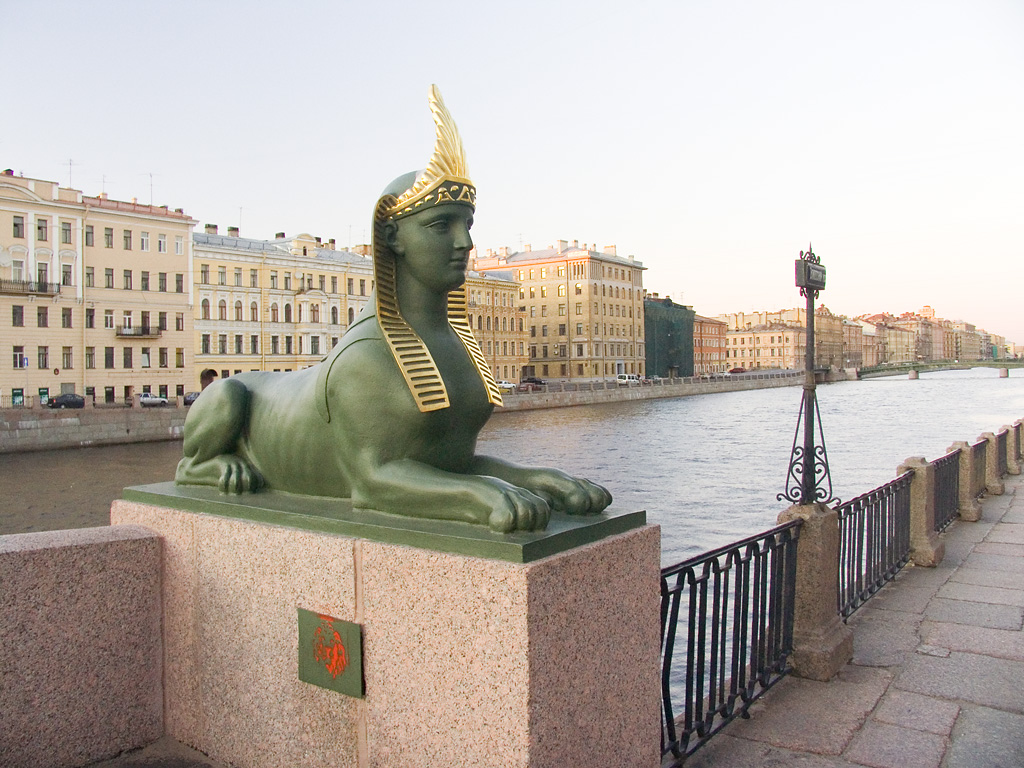
- Coordinates: 59°55′01″N 30°17′50″E

Location
- Interactive map of Egyptian Bridge

Egyptian Bridge (Египетский мост) in St. Petersburg, Russia, carries Lermontovsky Avenue (Лермонтовский проспект) over the Fontanka River.

The one-span suspension bridge that it replaced was of historical interest as a monument to early 19th-century Egyptomania. It was constructed in 1825–1826 based on designs by two civil engineers, Von Traitteur and Christianowicz. Its granite abutments were topped with cast-iron sphinxes and hexagonal lanterns. An unusual feature was a pair of cast-iron gates featuring Egyptian-style columns, ornaments, and hieroglyphics, with many details of the ironwork elaborately gilded.

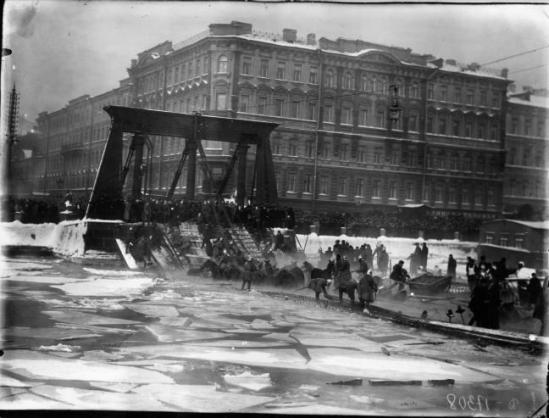
The 1905 collapse

The original bridge, used by both pedestrians and horse-drawn transport, collapsed on 20 January 1905 when a cavalry squadron was marching across it. The present structure, incorporating sphinxes and several other details from the 19th-century bridge, was completed in 1955.

== See also ==
- Quay with Sphinxes
