= List of buildings and structures in Saint Petersburg =

This is a list of buildings and structures in Saint Petersburg, Russia.

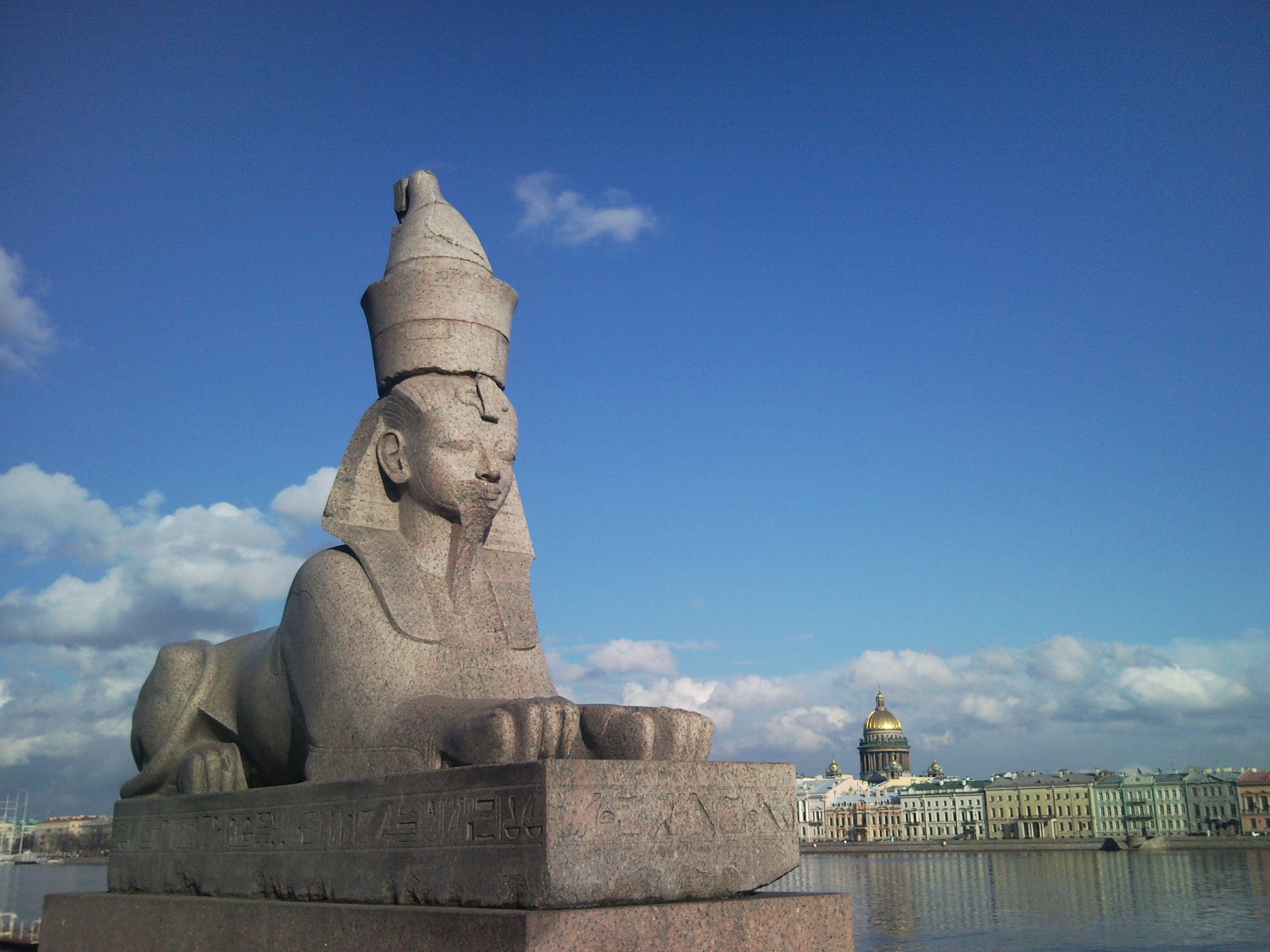
Quay with Sphinxes

== By alphabetical order ==
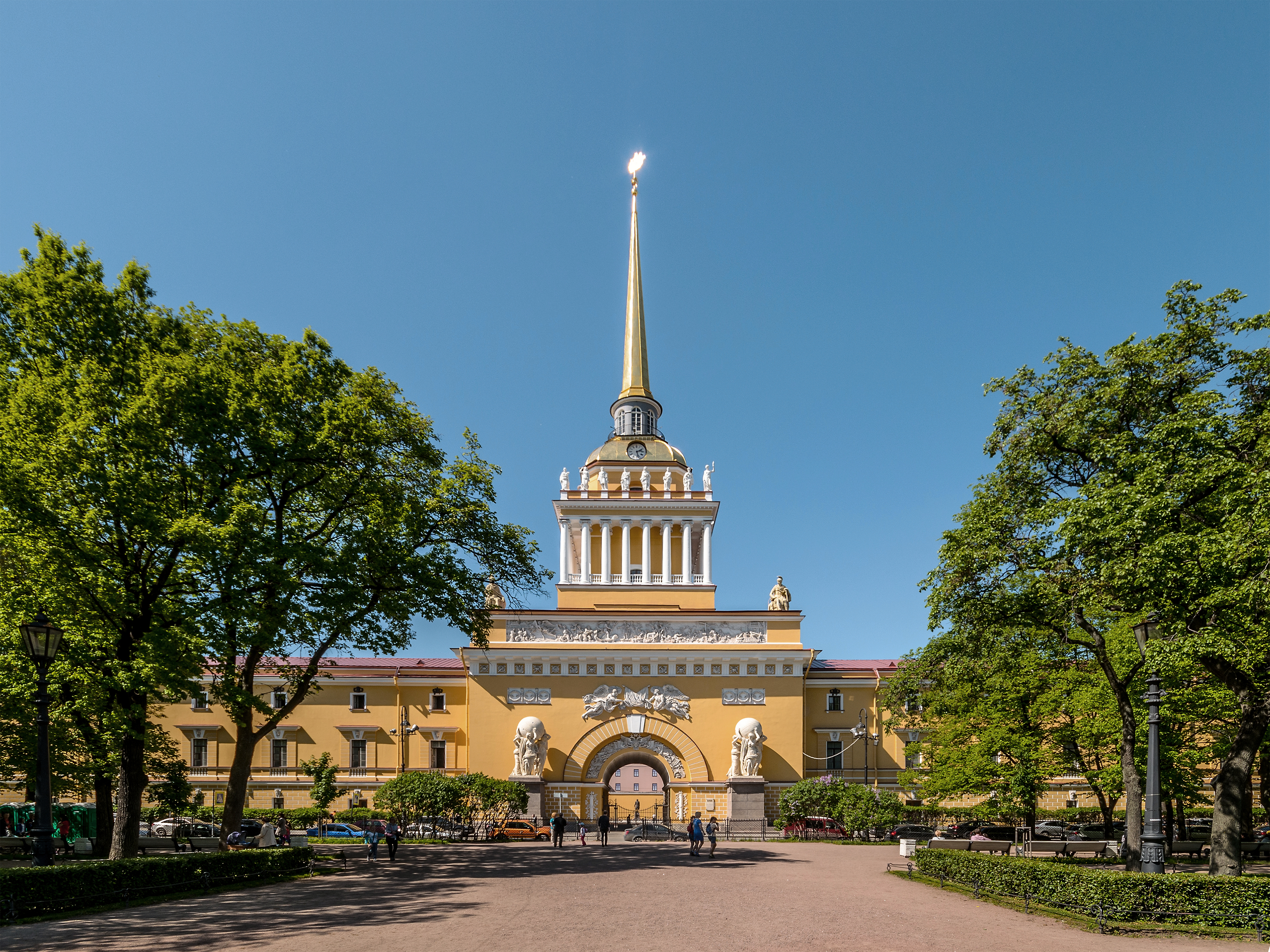
The Admiralty tower

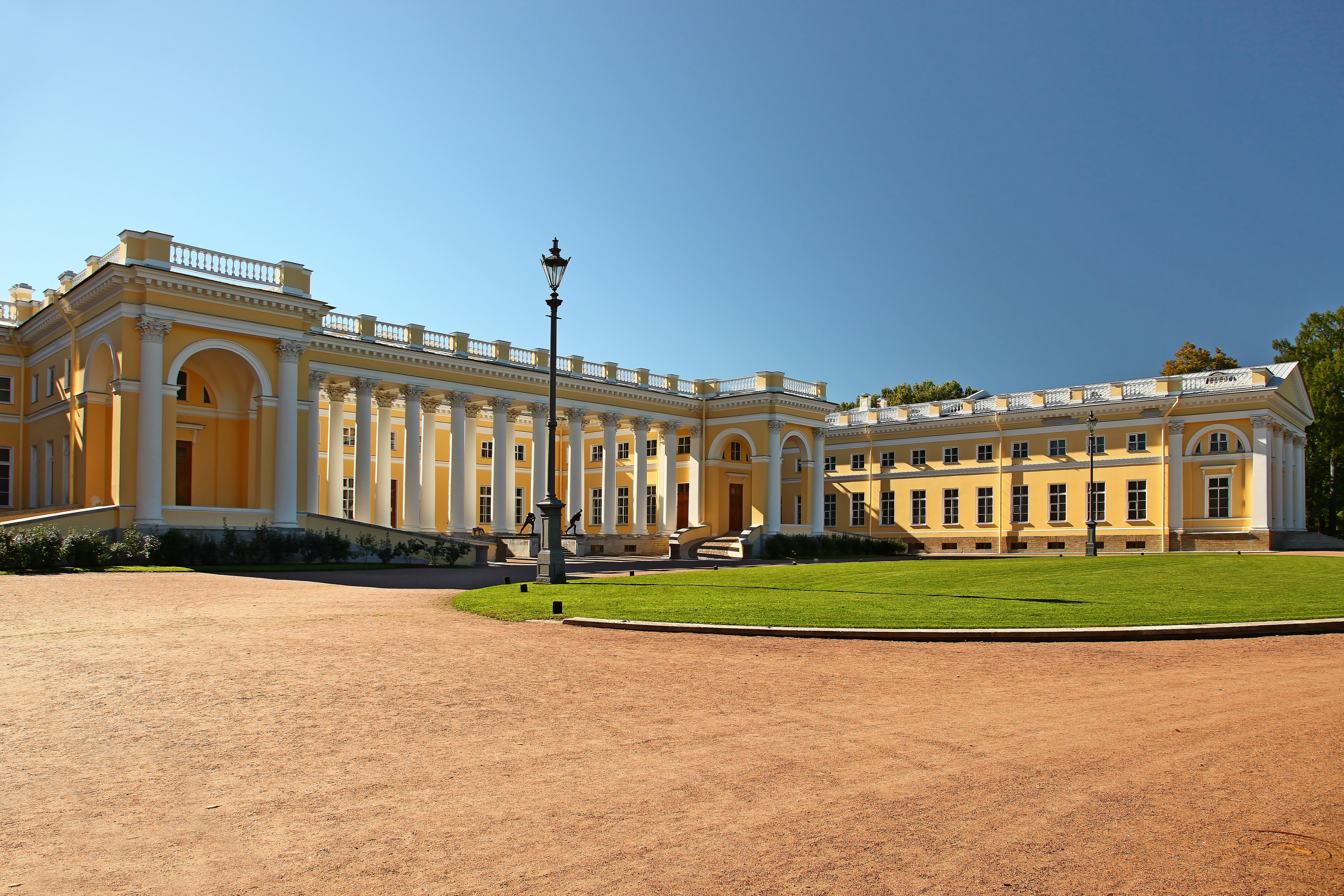
The Alexander Palace

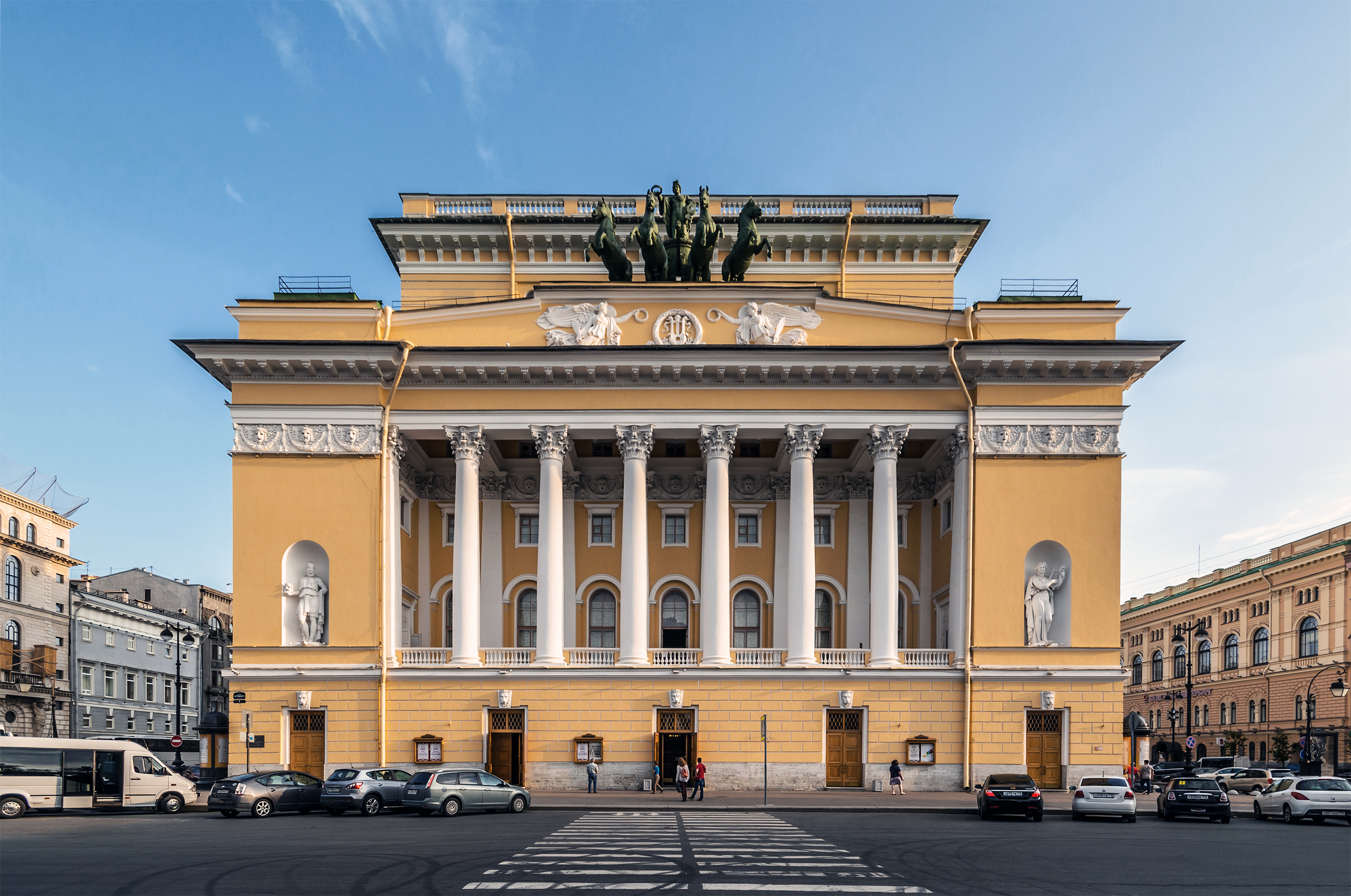
The Alexandrinsky Theatre

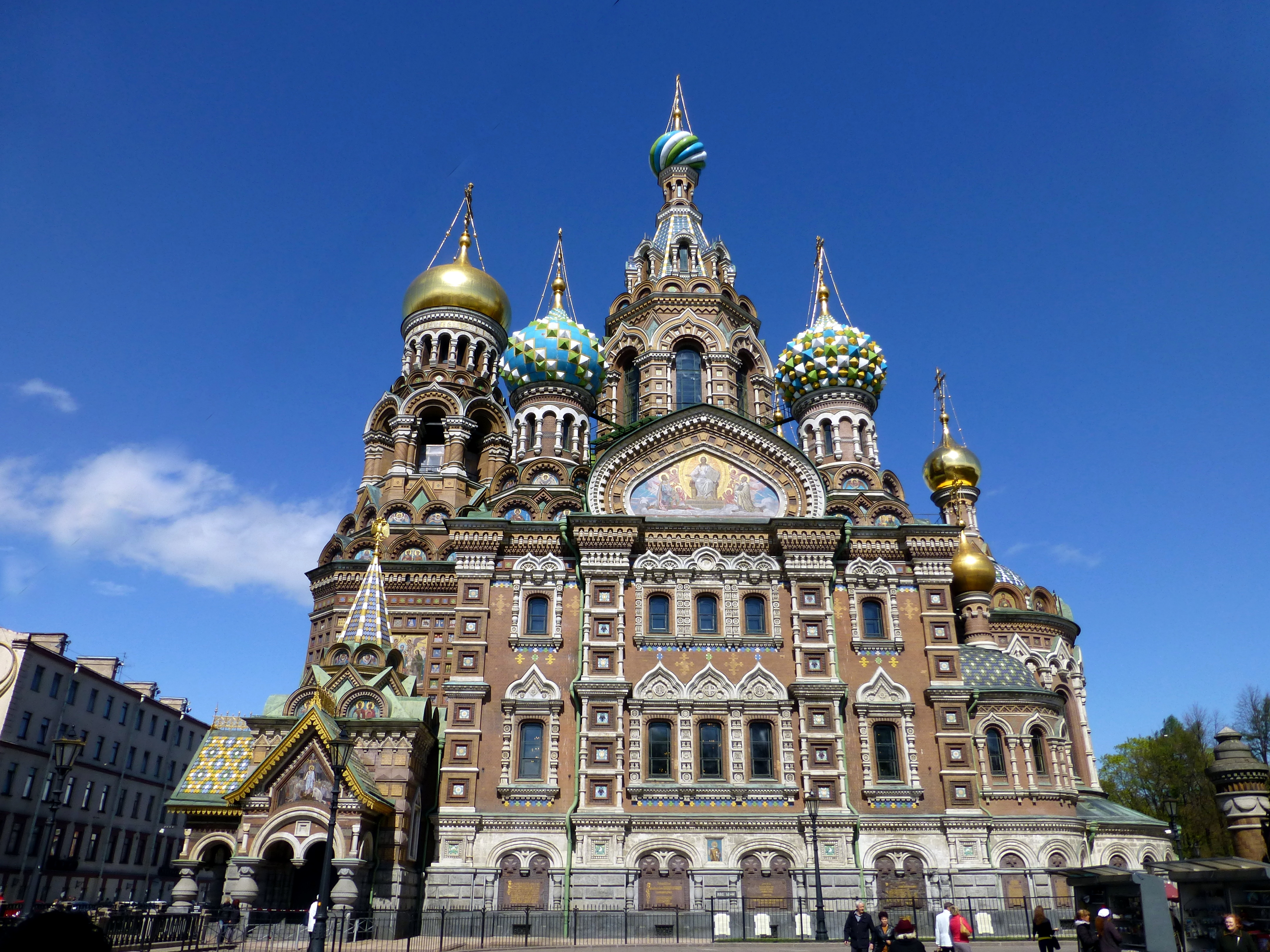
Church of the Savior on Blood

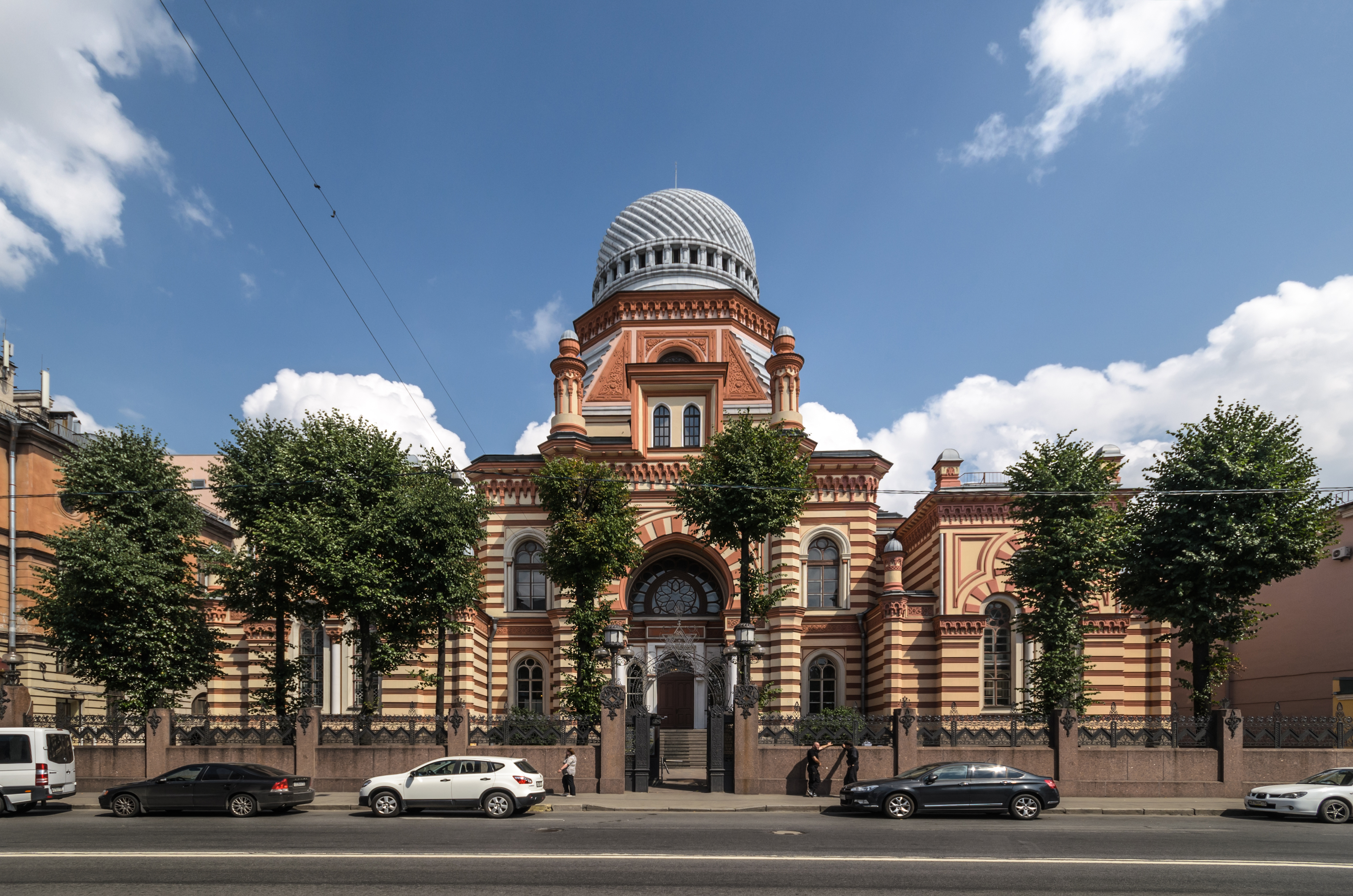
Grand Choral Synagogue

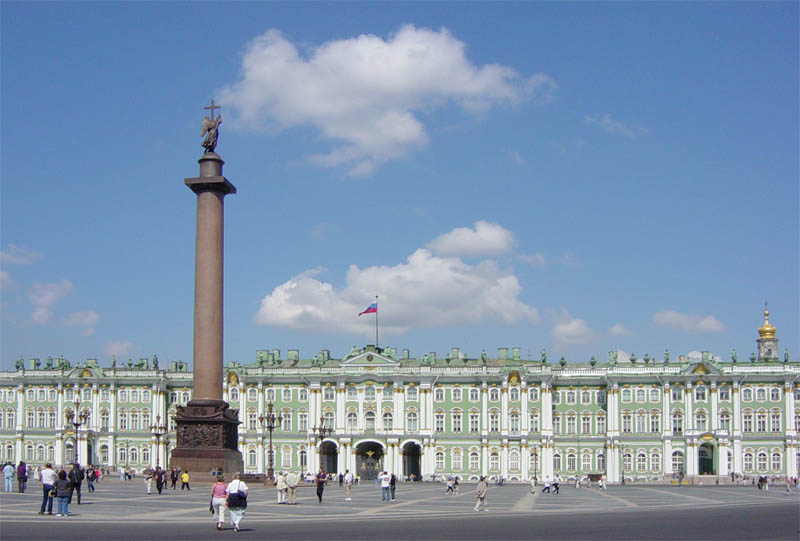
The Alexander Column and the Winter Palace in Palace Square

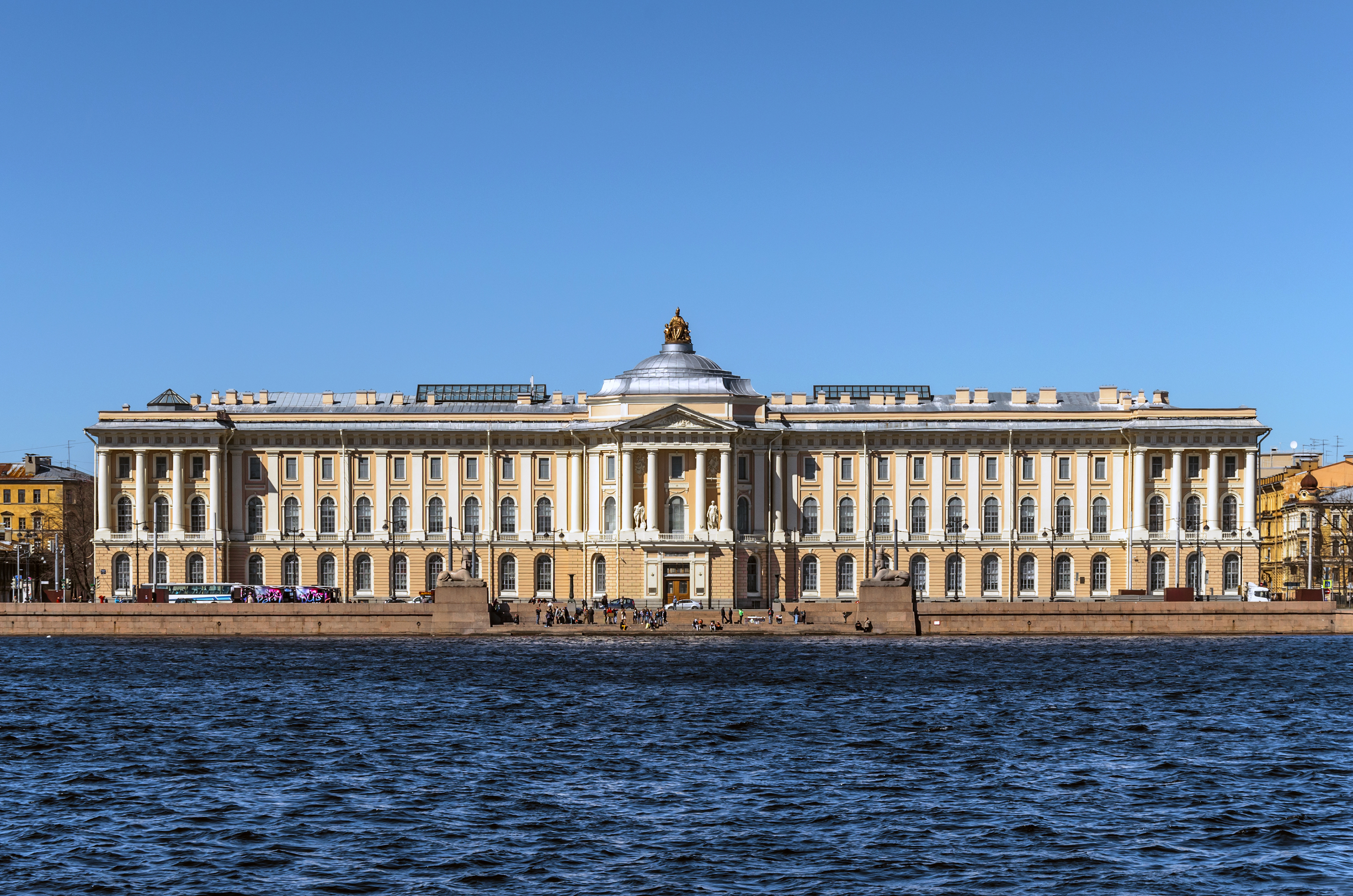
The Imperial Academy of Arts

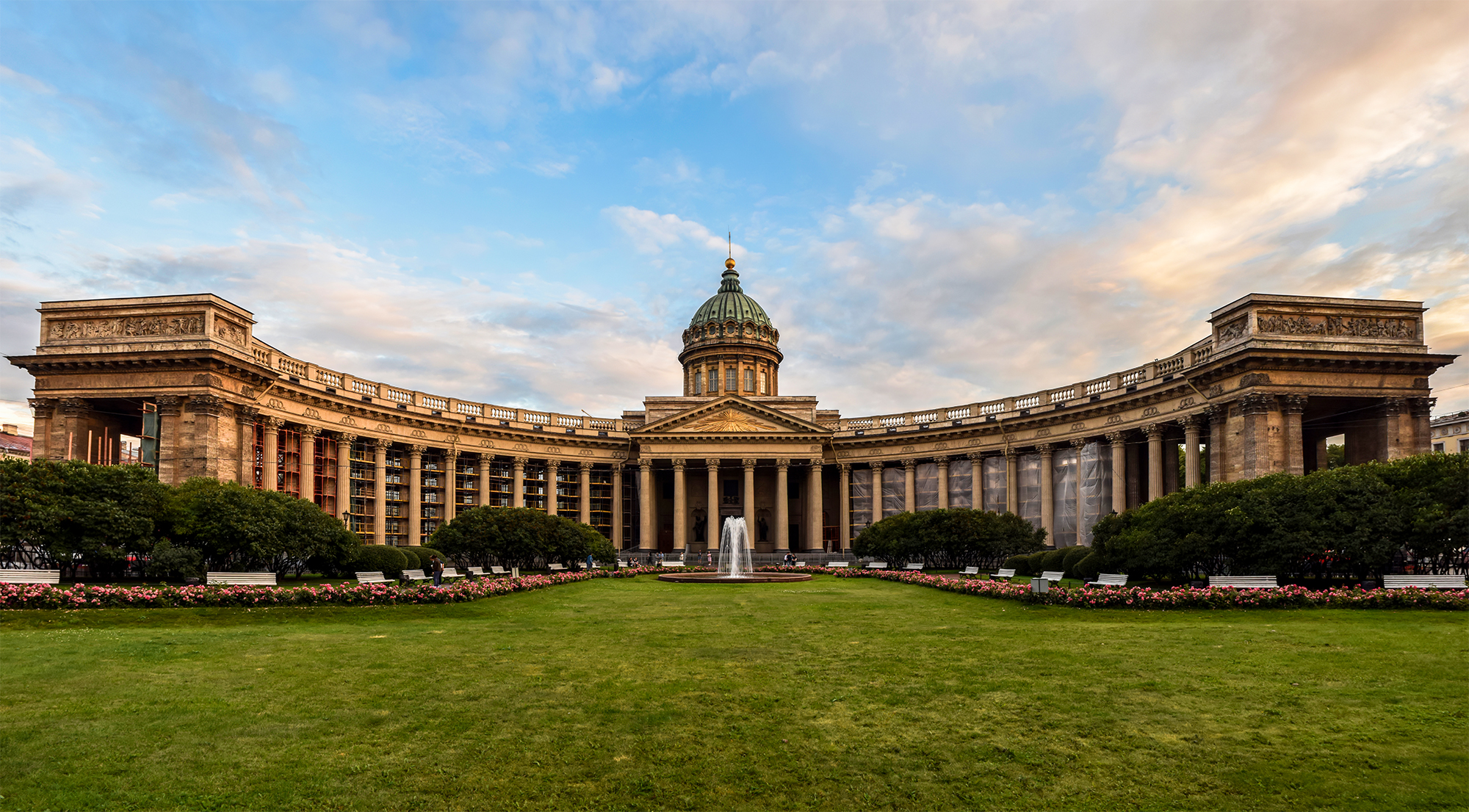
The Kazan Cathedral at night

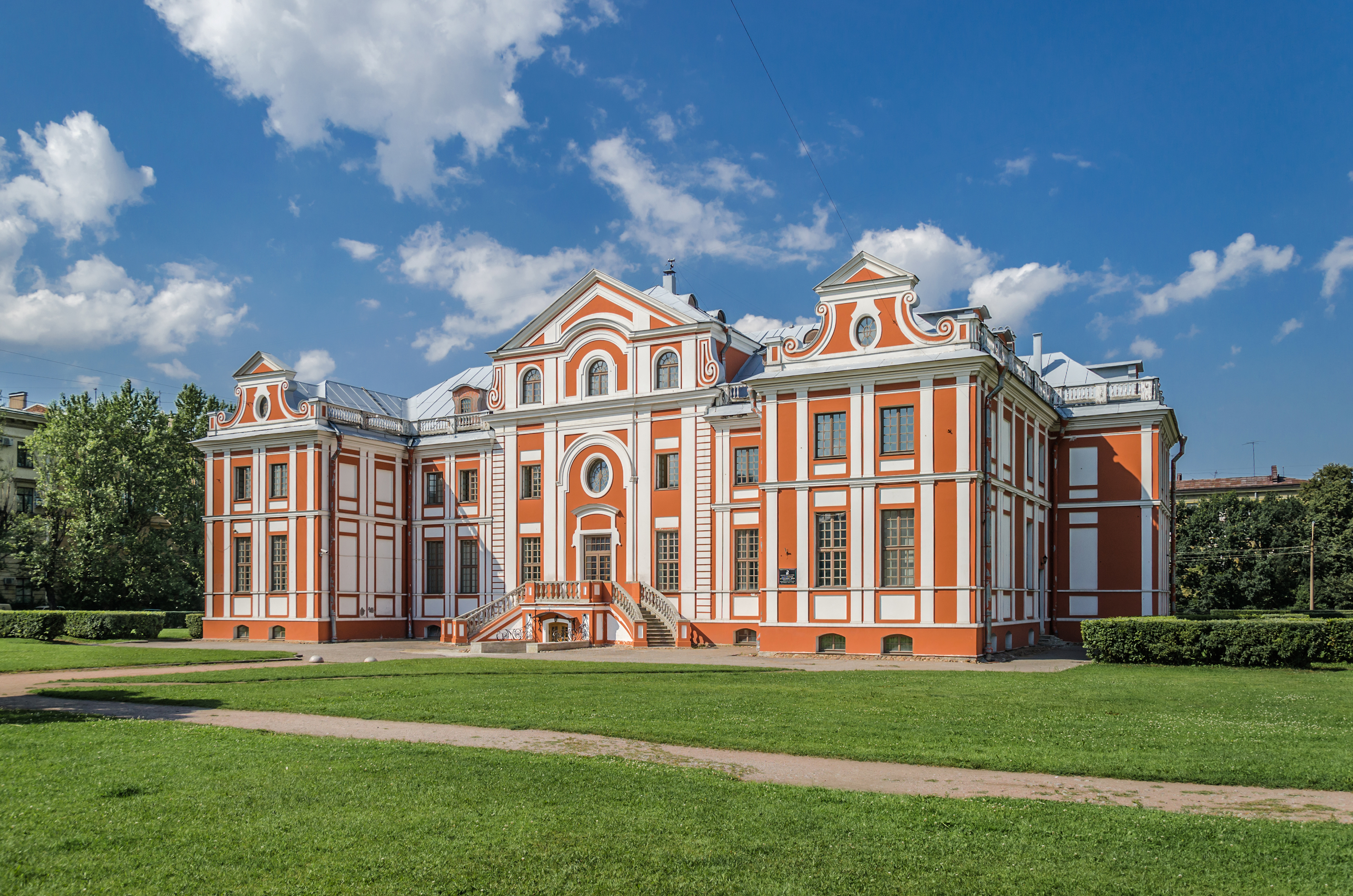
Kikin Hall

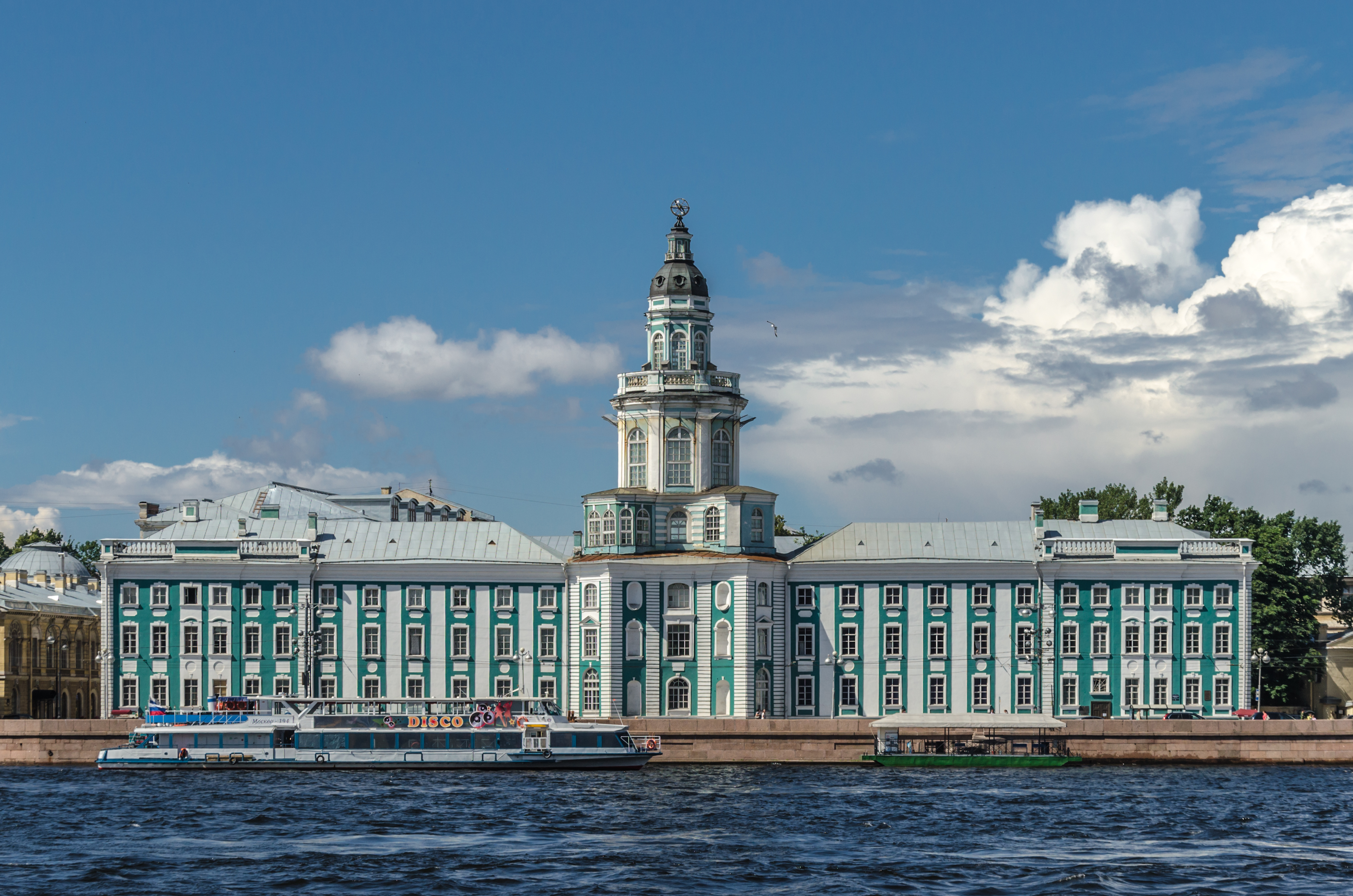
The Kunstkamera

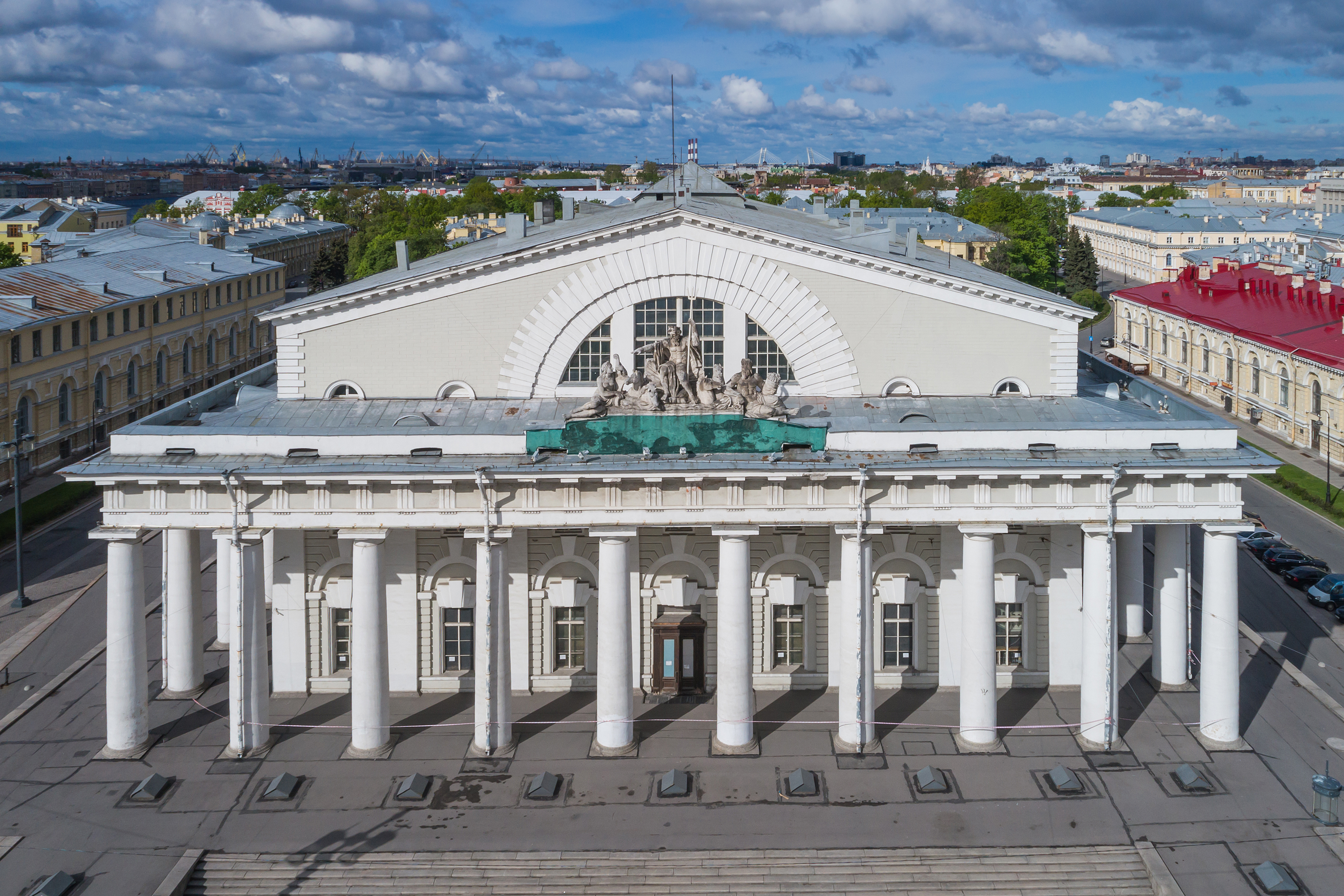
The Old Saint Petersburg Stock Exchange

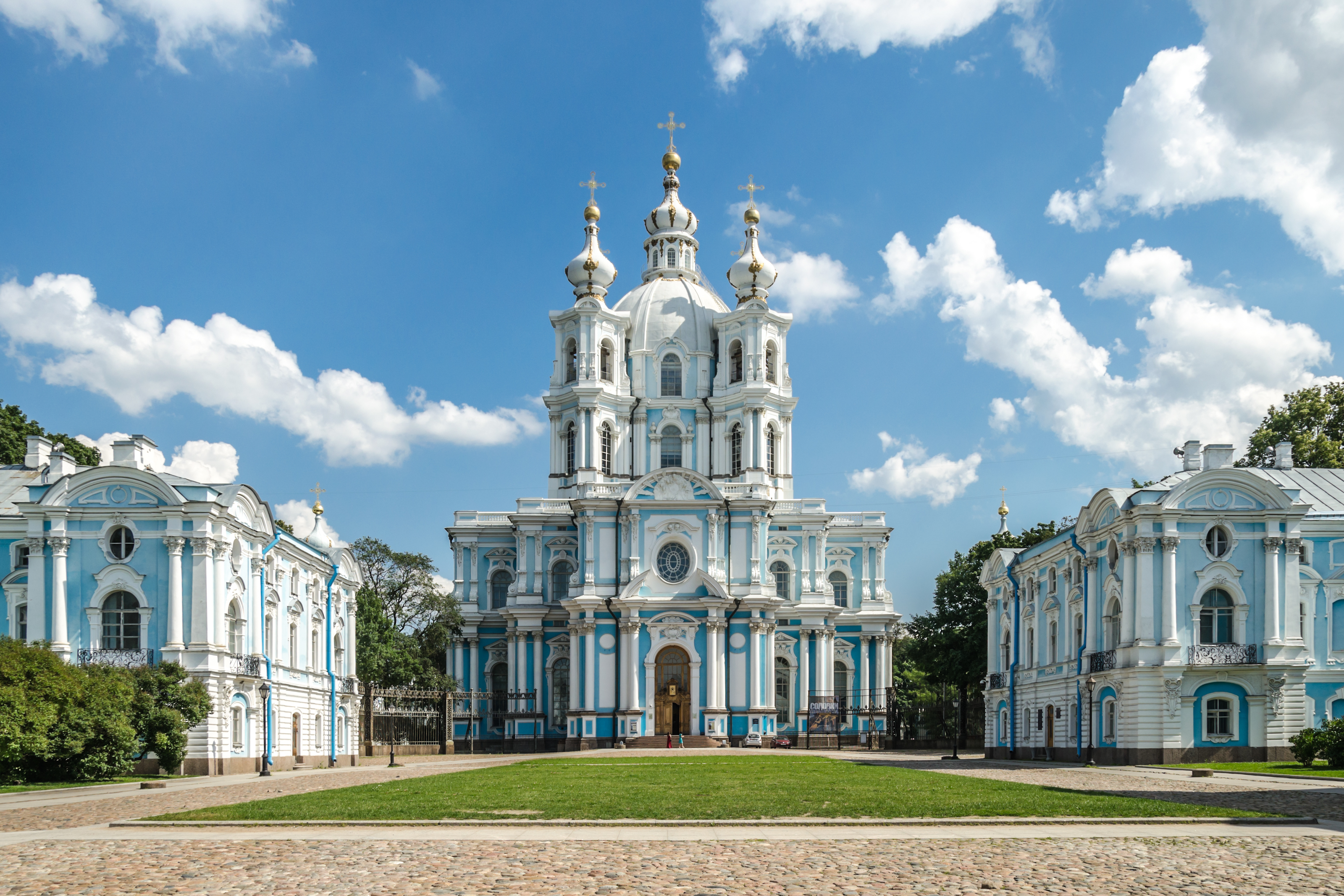
The Smolny Convent

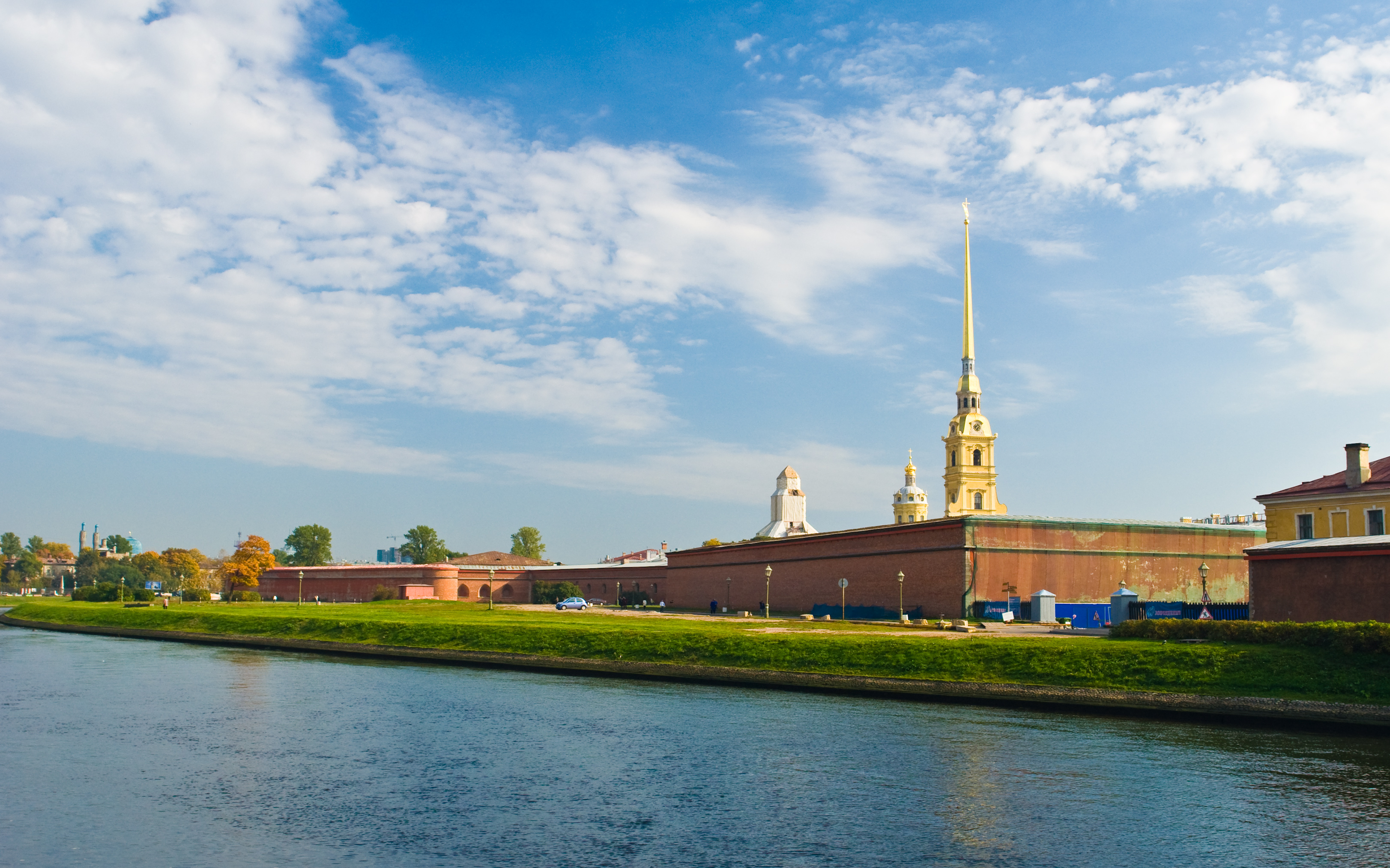
The Peter and Paul Fortress

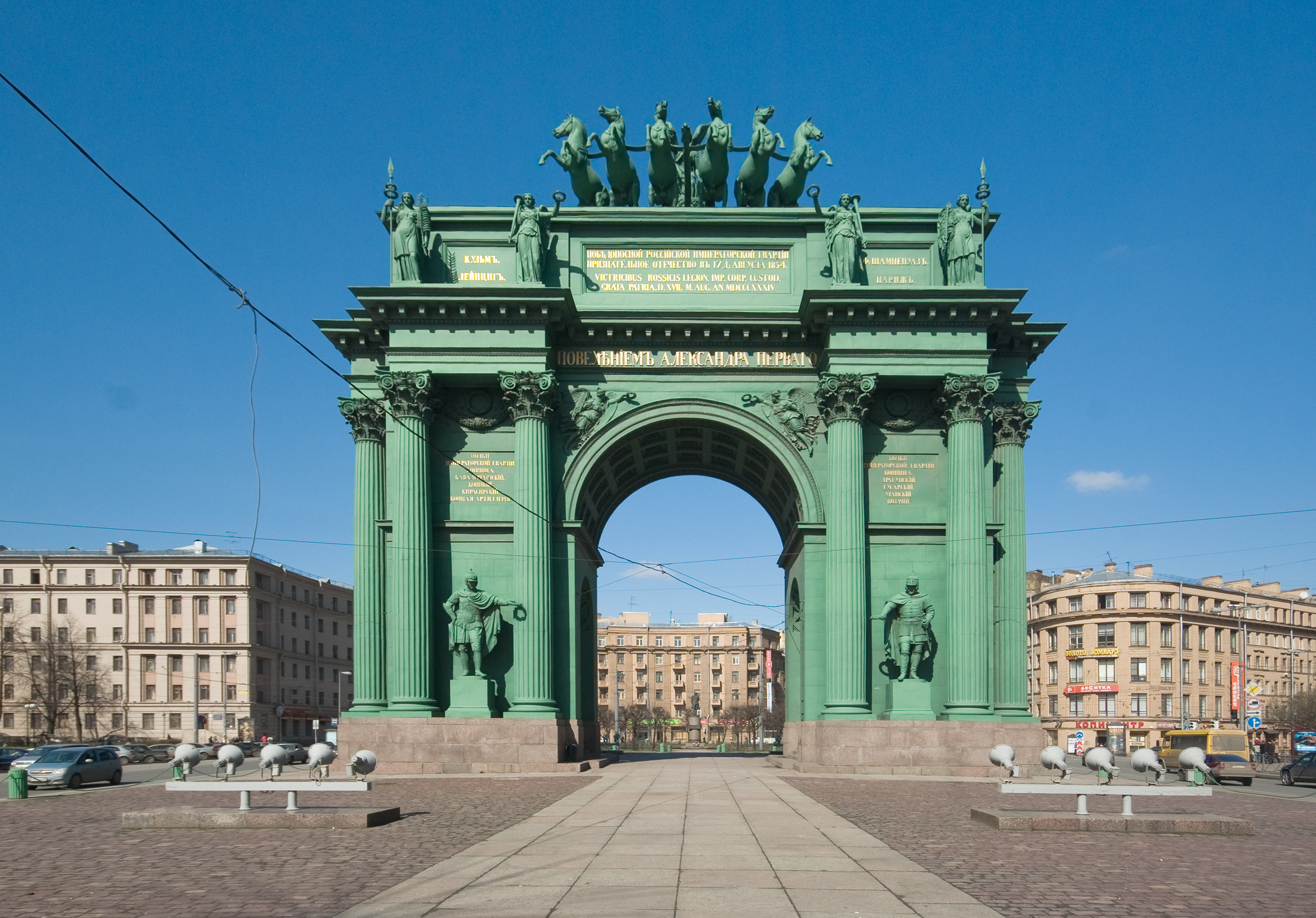
Narva Triumphal Gate

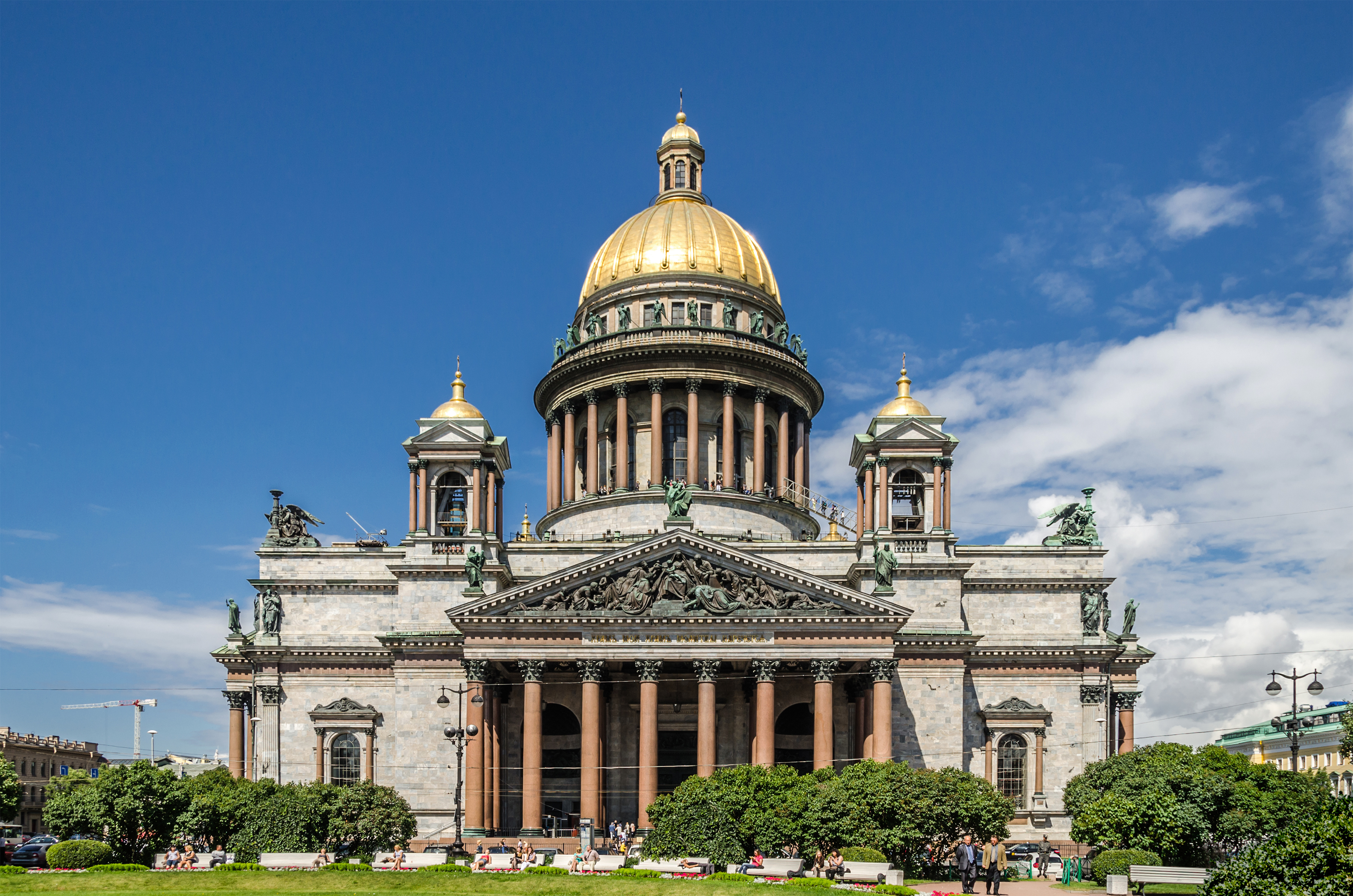
Saint Isaac's Cathedral

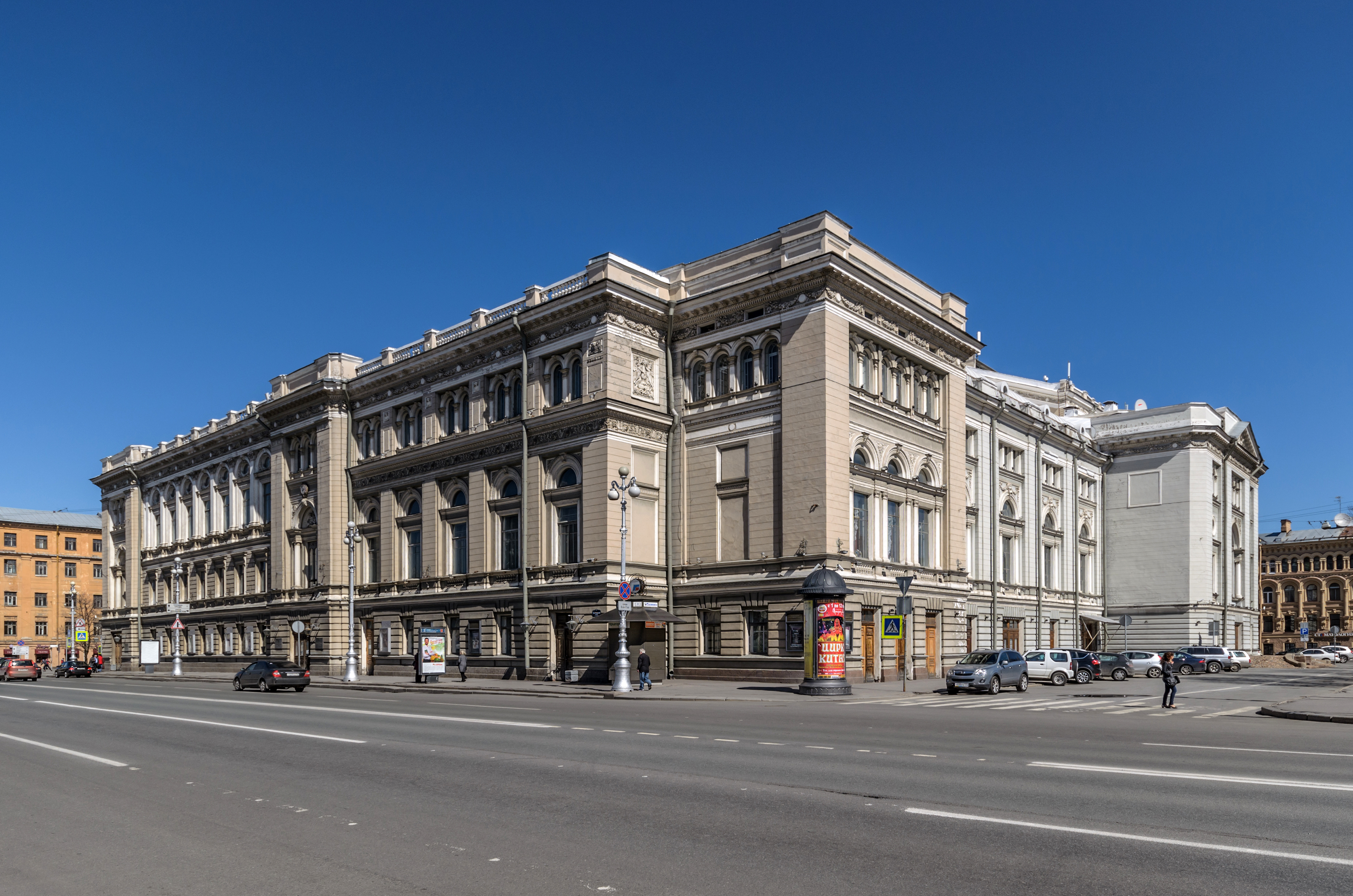
Saint Petersburg Conservatory

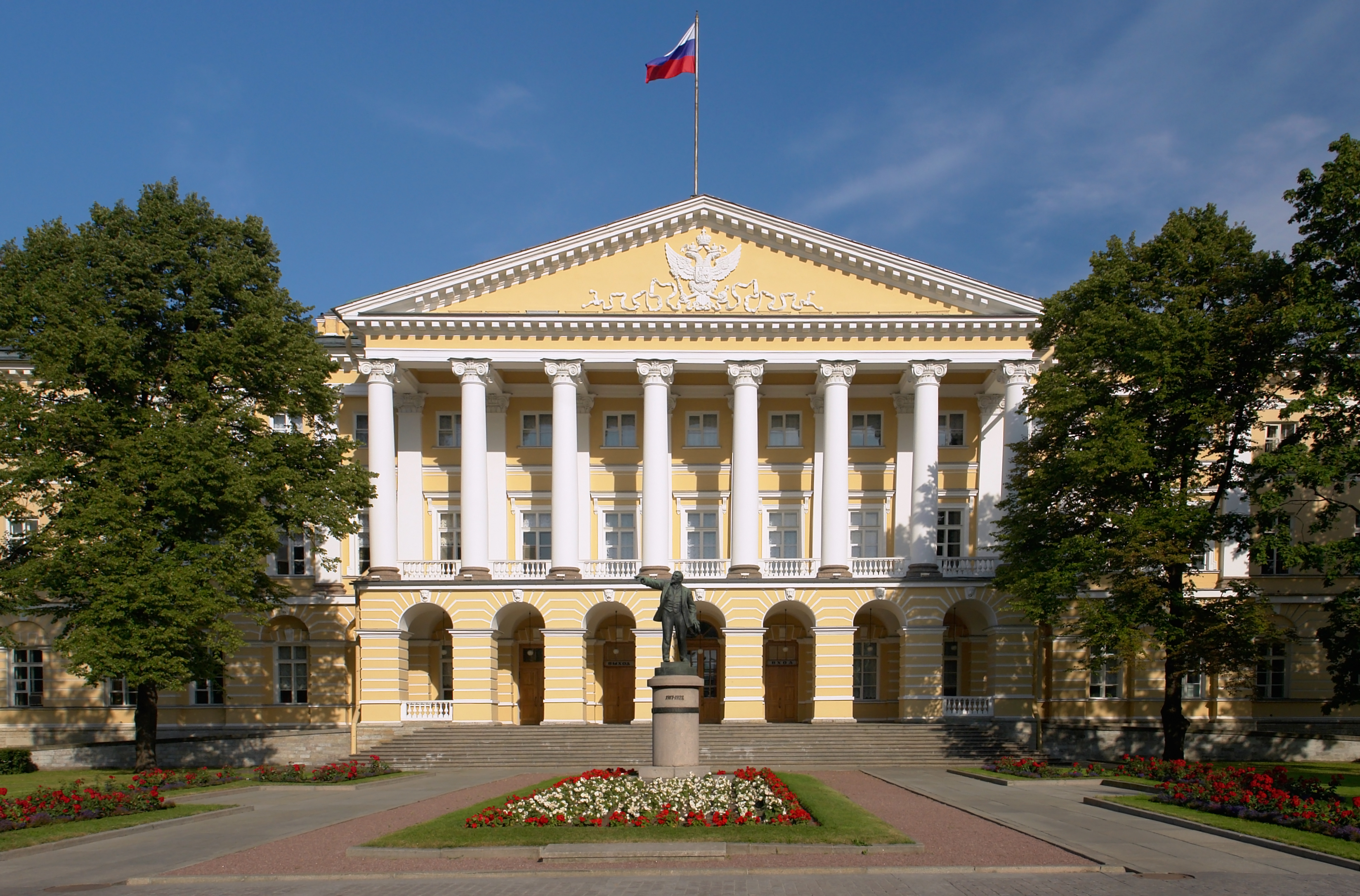
The Smolny Institute

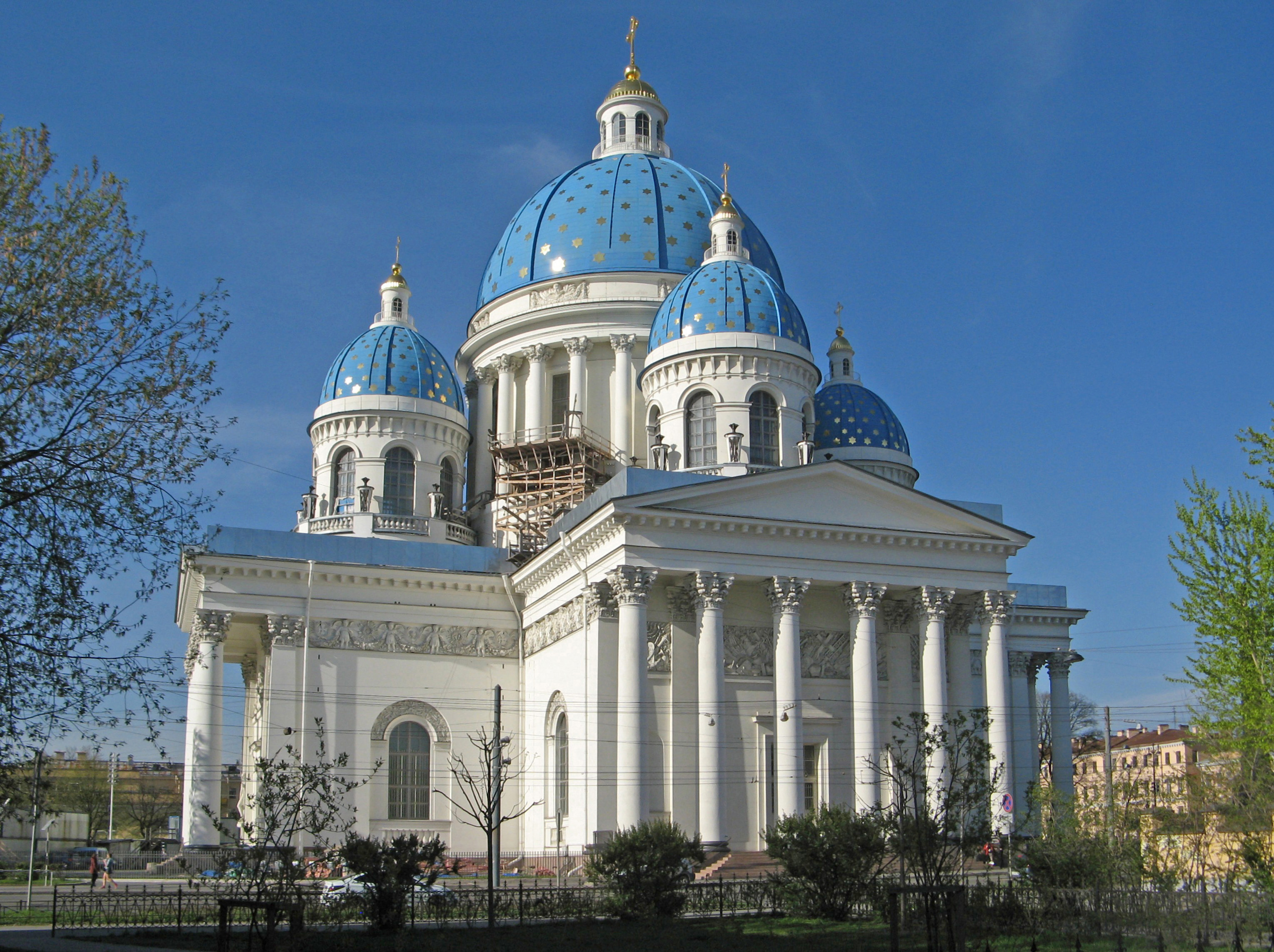
The Trinity Cathedral

- Admiralty building
- Admiralty Shipyard
- Alexander Nevsky Lavra
  - Dukhovskaya Church
  - Annunciation Church of the Alexander Nevsky Lavra
  - Feodorovskaya Church
  - Gate Church
  - Holy Trinity Cathedral of the Alexander Nevsky Lavra
  - Kazachye Cemetery
  - Lazarevskoe Cemetery
  - Nikolskoe Cemetery
  - Tikhvin Cemetery
- Alexis Palace
- Angleterre Hotel
- Anichkov Palace
- Apraksin Dvor
- Ascension Cathedral
- Baltic Shipyard
- Baltiysky Rail Terminal
- Beloselsky-Belozersky Palace
- Belozerovs' House
- Bobrinsky Palace
- Bolshoi Theatre
- Bolshoy Dom
- Bryantsev Youth Theatre
- Cathedral of the Assumption of the Blessed Virgin Mary
- Catholic Church of St. Catherine
- Chesme Church
- Chicherin House
- Church of St. Catherine
- Church of the Epiphany
- Church of the Savior on Blood
- Ciniselli Circus
- Coastal Monastery of Saint Sergius
- Corinthia Hotel St. Petersburg
- Dacha Durnovo
- Datsan Gunzechoinei, northernmost Buddhist temple in Russia
- DLT
- Elisseeff Emporium
- Esders and Scheefhaals building
- Evangelical Lutheran Church of Saint Mary
- Finland Station
- Fort Alexander
- Fountain House
- General Staff Building
- Gothic Chapel
- Grand Choral Synagogue
- Grand Hotel Europe
- Great Gostiny Dvor
- Green Bridge
- Hermitage Museum
  - Hermitage Theatre
  - Winter Palace
- Herzen University
- Hotel Astoria
- House of Soviets
- Ice Palace (arena)
- Imperial Academy of Arts
- Ioannovsky Convent
- Kagul Obelisk
- Kamenny Island Theatre
- Karl Knipper Theatre
- Kazan Cathedral
- Kikin Hall
- Kirov Plant
- Kirov Stadium
- Kotomin House
- Kronstadt Naval Cathedral
- Kronverk
- Kunstkamera
- Kuryokhin Center
- Ladozhsky Rail Terminal
- Lakhta Center
- Library of the Russian Academy of Sciences
- Lutheran Church of Saint Peter and Saint Paul
- Mariinsky Palace, Legislative Assembly of Saint Petersburg wherein
- Mariinsky Theatre
- Mikhailovsky Theatre
- Mikhailovsky Palace
- Moika Palace
- Monument to the Fighters of the Revolution
- Monument to Nizami Ganjavi in Saint Petersburg
- Moskovsky railway station
- Moscow Triumphal Gate
- Muruzi House
- Musin-Pushkin House
- Narva Triumphal Gate
- National Library of Russia
- New Holland Island, the historical building complex
- Nicholas Palace
- Obukhov State Plant
- Okhta Center
- Oktyabrskiy Big Concert Hall
- Old Saint Petersburg Stock Exchange and Rostral Columns
- Old Trinity Cathedral
- Passage, The
- Peter and Paul Fortress
  - Grand Ducal Burial Vault
  - Peter and Paul Cathedral
  - Saint Petersburg Mint
- Petrovsky Stadium
- Piskaryovskoye Memorial Cemetery
- Pravda 10, St. Petersburg
- Pulkovo Airport
- Pulkovo Observatory
- Pushkin House
- Rossi Pavilion
- Rumyantsev Obelisk
- Russian Museum
  - Marble Palace
  - Mikhailovsky Palace (the main building)
  - Summer Palace
- Sacred Heart Church, St. Petersburg
  - Saint Michael's Castle
- Saint Andrew's Cathedral
- Saint Catherine's Armenian Church
- Saint Isaac's Cathedral
- Saint Petersburg City Duma
- Saint Petersburg Commodity and Stock Exchange
- Saint Petersburg Conservatory
- St. Petersburg Department of Steklov Mathematical Institute of Russian Academy of Sciences
- Saint Petersburg Lyceum 239
- Saint Petersburg Manege
- Saint Petersburg Mosque
- Saint Petersburg Sports and Concert Complex
- Saint Petersburg State Institute of Technology
- Saint Petersburg State University
- Saint Petersburg Stock Exchange
- Saint Petersburg TV Tower
- Saint Sampson's Cathedral
- Saltykov Mansion
- Saviour Church on Sennaya Square
- Senate and Synod Building
- Sibur Arena
- Singer House
- Smolny Convent
- Smolny Institute
- Solovetsky Stone
- St. John the Baptist Church
- St. John's Church
- St. Julian's Church
- St. Nicholas Naval Cathedral
- St. Stanislaus Church
- St. Vladimir's Cathedral
- Stieglitz Museum of Applied Arts
- Summer Palace of Peter the Great
- Suvorov Museum
- Tauride Palace
- Tolstoy House
- Transfiguration Cathedral
- Trinity Cathedral
- Twelve Collegia
- Utkina Dacha
- Varshavsky Rail Terminal (former), Warsaw Express trade center wherein
- Vitebsky railway station
- Vladimirskaya Church
- Wawelberg Bank building
- Yelagin Palace
- Yubileyny Sports Palace
- Zoological Museum of the Russian Academy of Science

== By type ==
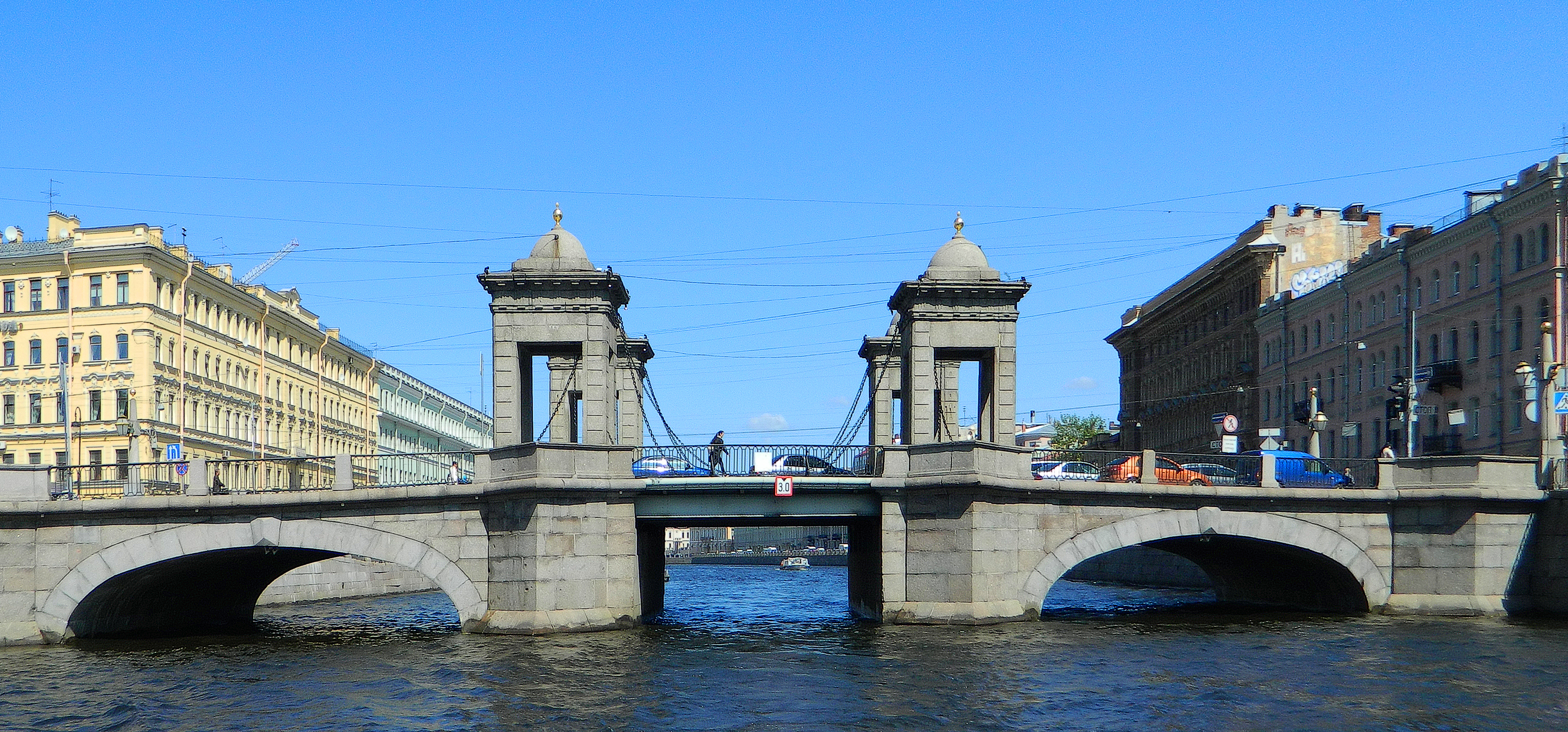
The Lomonosov Bridge

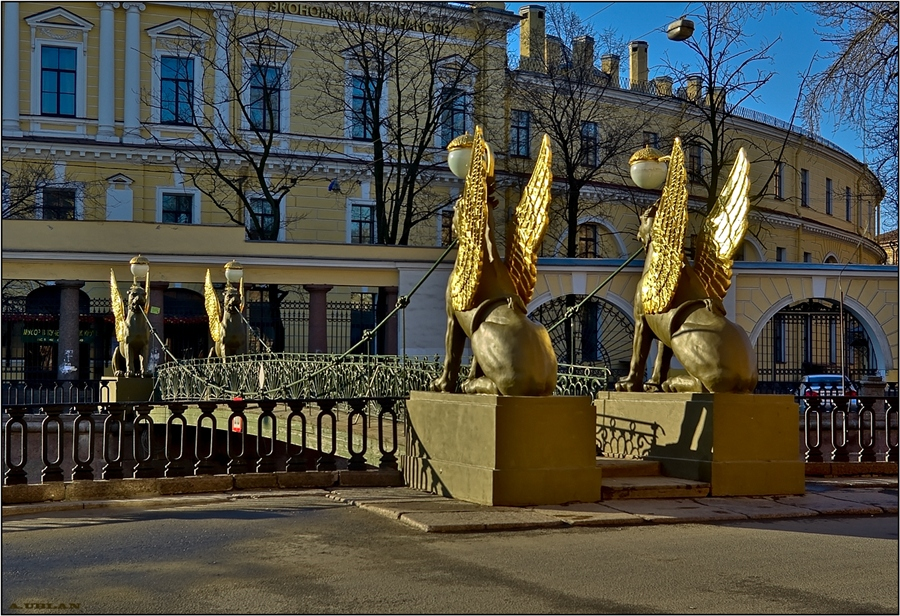
Bank Bridge

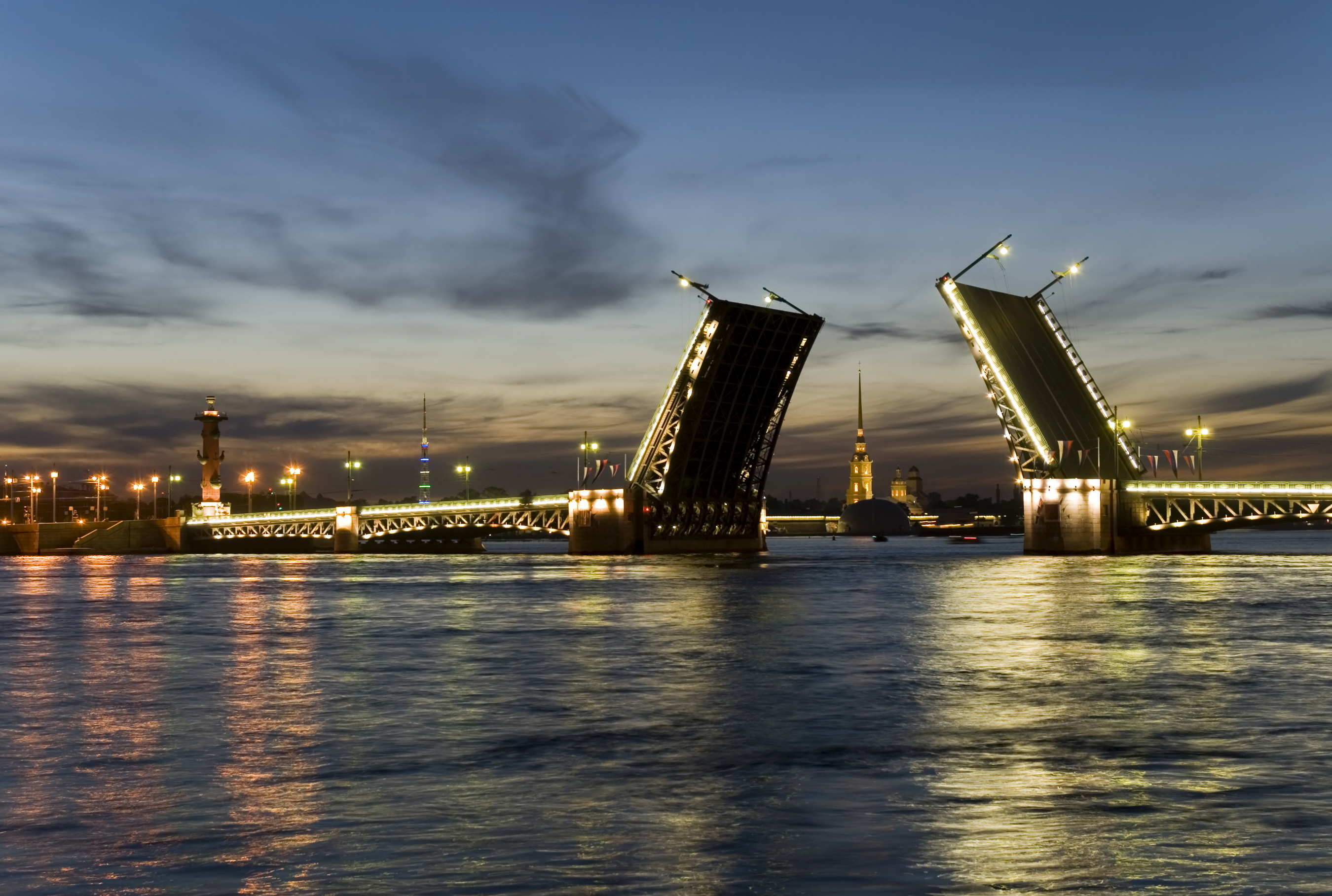
The Palace Bridge

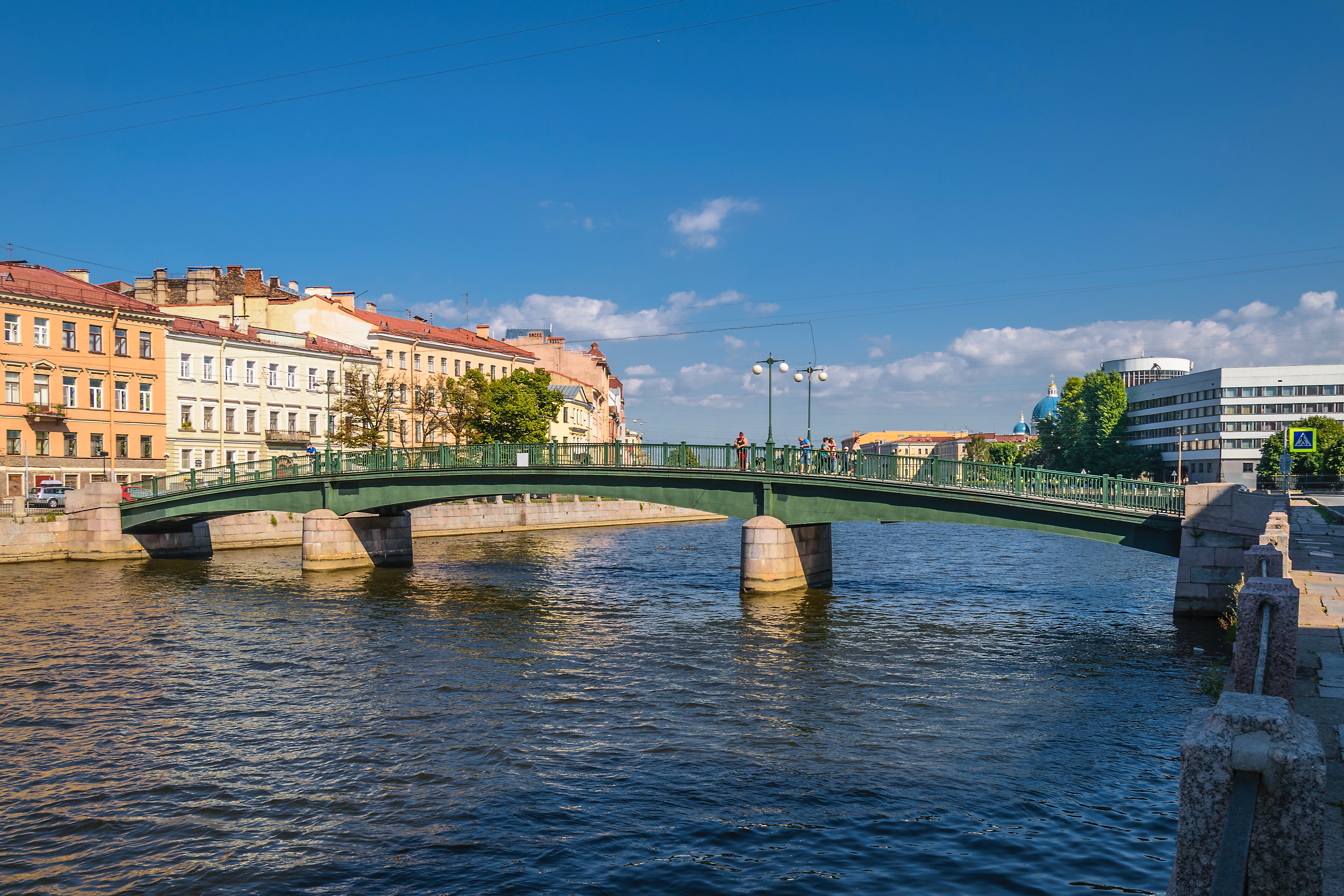
The English Bridge

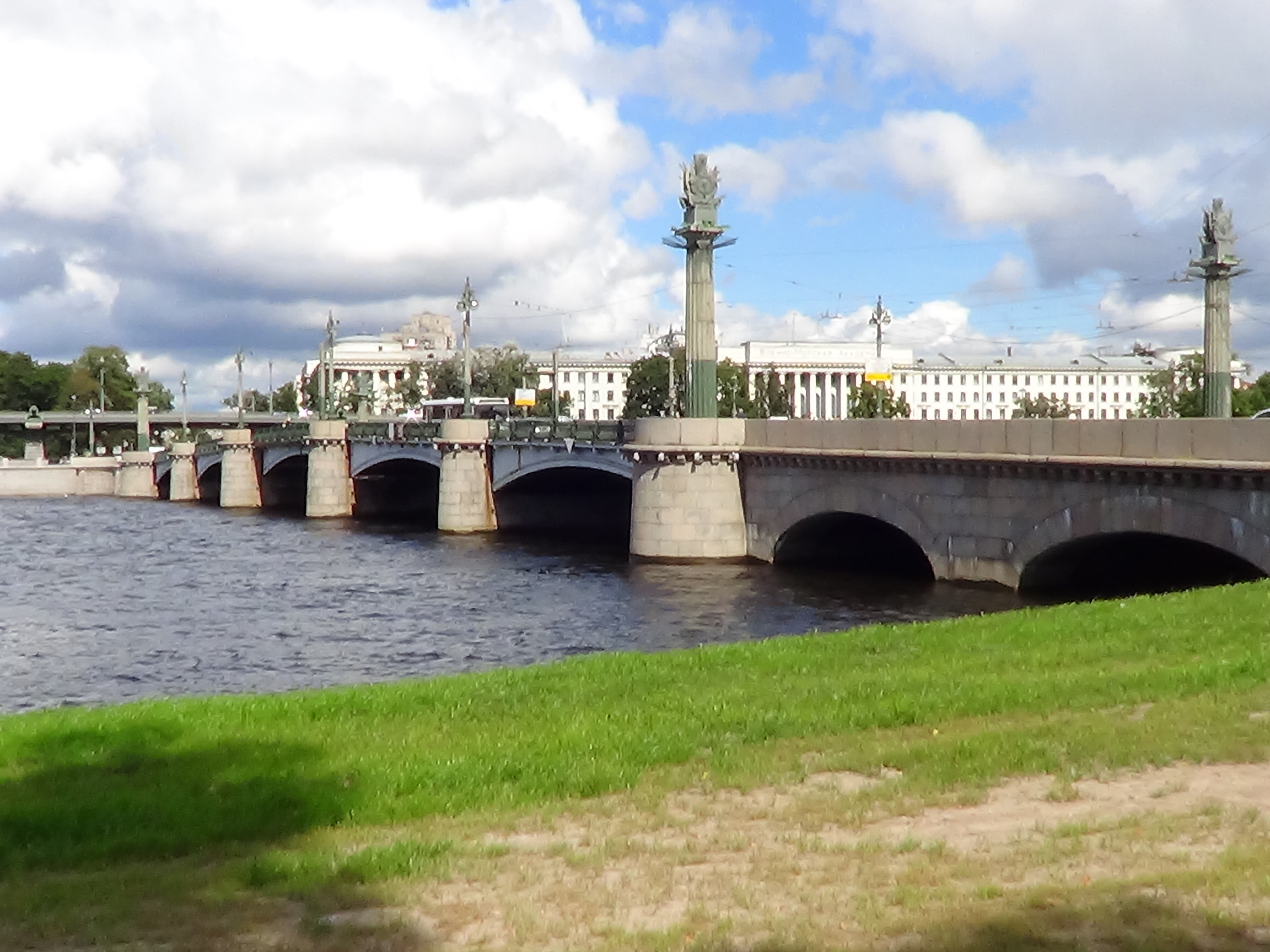
Ushakovsky Bridge

=== Bridges ===
- Alexander Nevsky Bridge
- Anichkov Bridge
- Annunciation Bridge
- Bank Bridge
- Betancourt Bridge
- Blue Bridge
- Bolsheokhtinsky Bridge
- Bolshoy Obukhovsky Bridge
- Bolshoy Petrovsky Bridge
- Bridge of Four Lions
- Egyptian Bridge
- English Bridge
- Exchange Bridge
- Finland Railway Bridge
- First Engineer Bridge
- First Winter Bridge
- Green Bridge
- Hermitage Bridge
- Italian Bridge
- Kazansky Bridge
- Lazarevskiy Bridge
- Liteyny Bridge
- Lomonosov Bridge
- Malo-Kalinkin Bridge
- Marble Bridge
- Palace Bridge
- Panteleymonovsky Bridge
- Pevchesky Bridge
- Pochtamtsky Bridge
- Red Bridge
- Rossi Bridge
- Saint Isaac's Bridge
- Stone Bridge
- Trinity Bridge
- Tripartite Bridge
- Tuchkov Bridge
- Ushakovsky Bridge
- Volodarsky Bridge

=== Churches, cathedrals, and monasteries ===
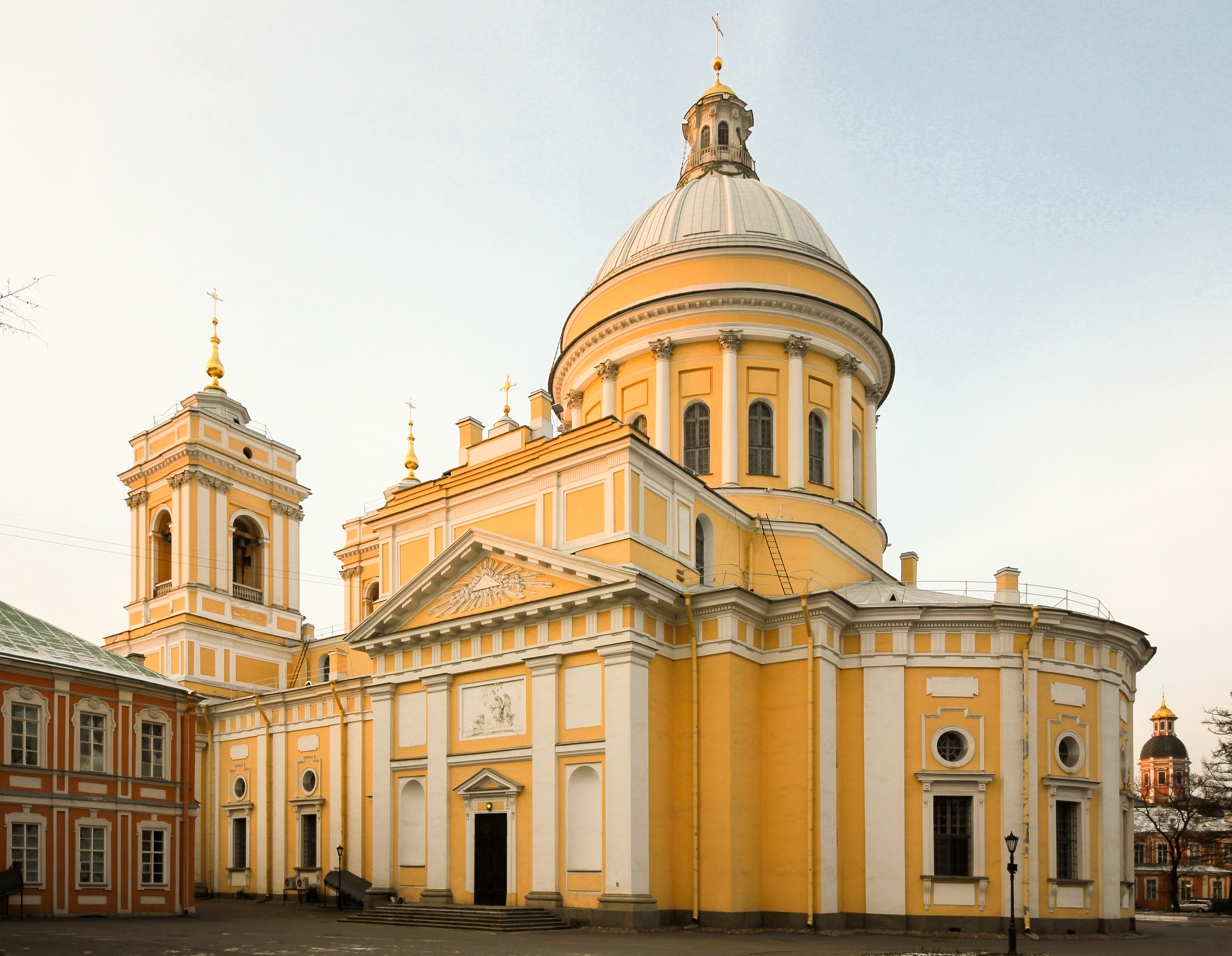
Holy Trinity Cathedral of the Alexander Nevsky Lavra

Church of the Savior on Blood

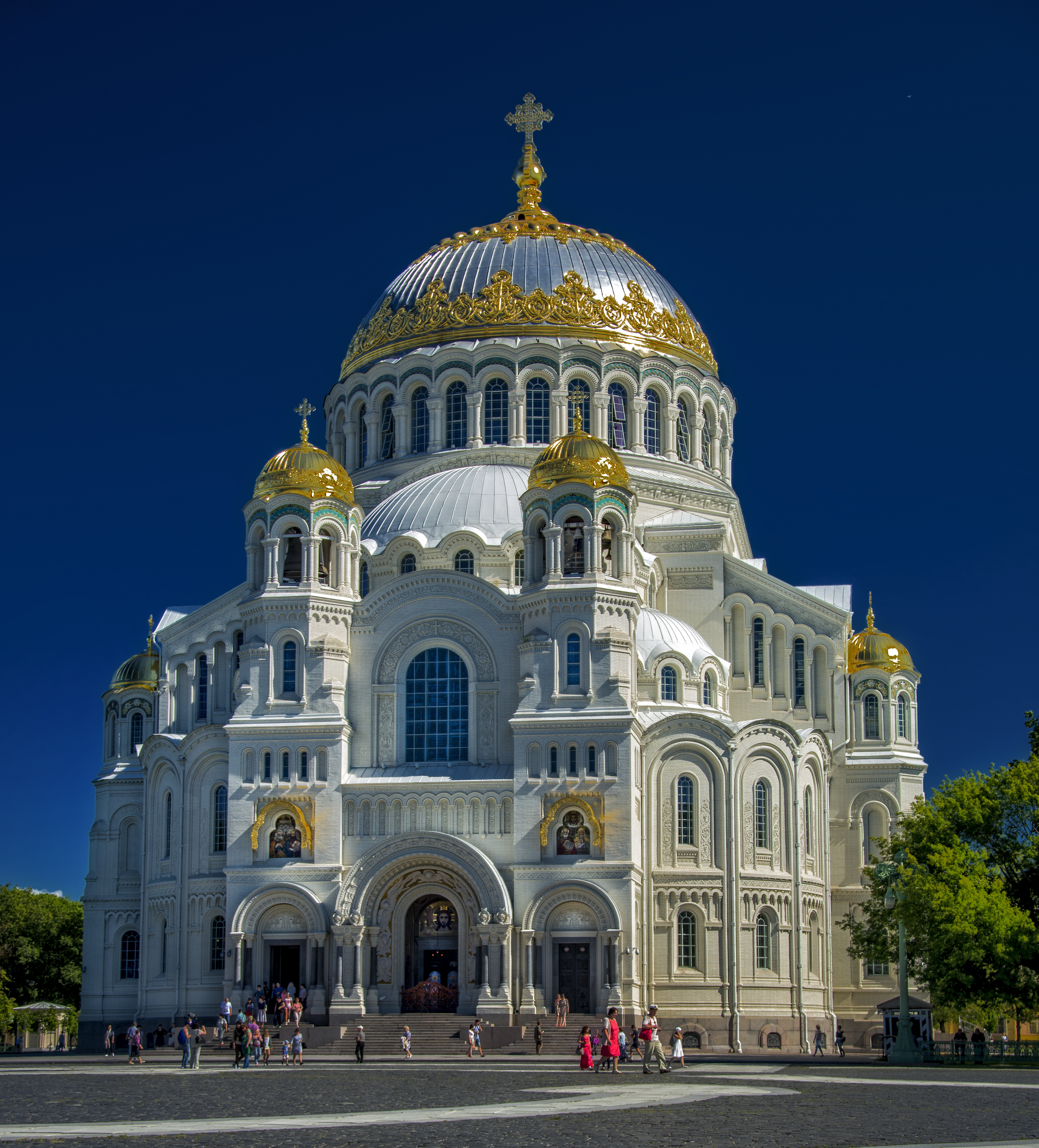
Kronstadt Naval Cathedral

- Alexander Nevsky Lavra
  - Holy Trinity Cathedral
  - Annunciation Church
  - Dukhovskaya Church
  - Feodorovskaya Church
  - Gate Church
- Annenkirche
- Ascension Cathedral
- Cathedral of the Assumption of the Blessed Virgin Mary
- Chesme Church
- Church of Our Lady of Kazan
- Church of Our Lady the Merciful
- Church of the Dormition of the Mother of God
- Church of the Epiphany
- Church of St. Catherine
- Church of the Savior on Blood
- Coastal Monastery of Saint Sergius
- Evangelical Lutheran Church of Saint Catherine
- Evangelical Lutheran Church of Saint Mary
- Gothic Chapel
- Ioannovsky Convent
- Kazan Cathedral
- Kronstadt Naval Cathedral
- Lutheran Church of Saint Michael
- Lutheran Church of Saint Peter and Saint Paul
- Old Trinity Cathedral
- Sacred Heart Church
- Saint Andrew's Cathedral
- Saint Catherine's Armenian Church
- Saint Isaac's Cathedral
- Saint John's Church
- Saint John the Baptist Church
- Saint Julian's Church
- Saint Nicholas Naval Cathedral
- Saints Peter and Paul Cathedral
- Saint Sampson's Cathedral
- Saint Stanislaus Church
- Saint Vladimir's Cathedral
- Saviour Church on Sennaya Square
- Smolny Convent
- Transfiguration Cathedral
- Trinity Cathedral
- Vladimirskaya Church

=== Hotels ===
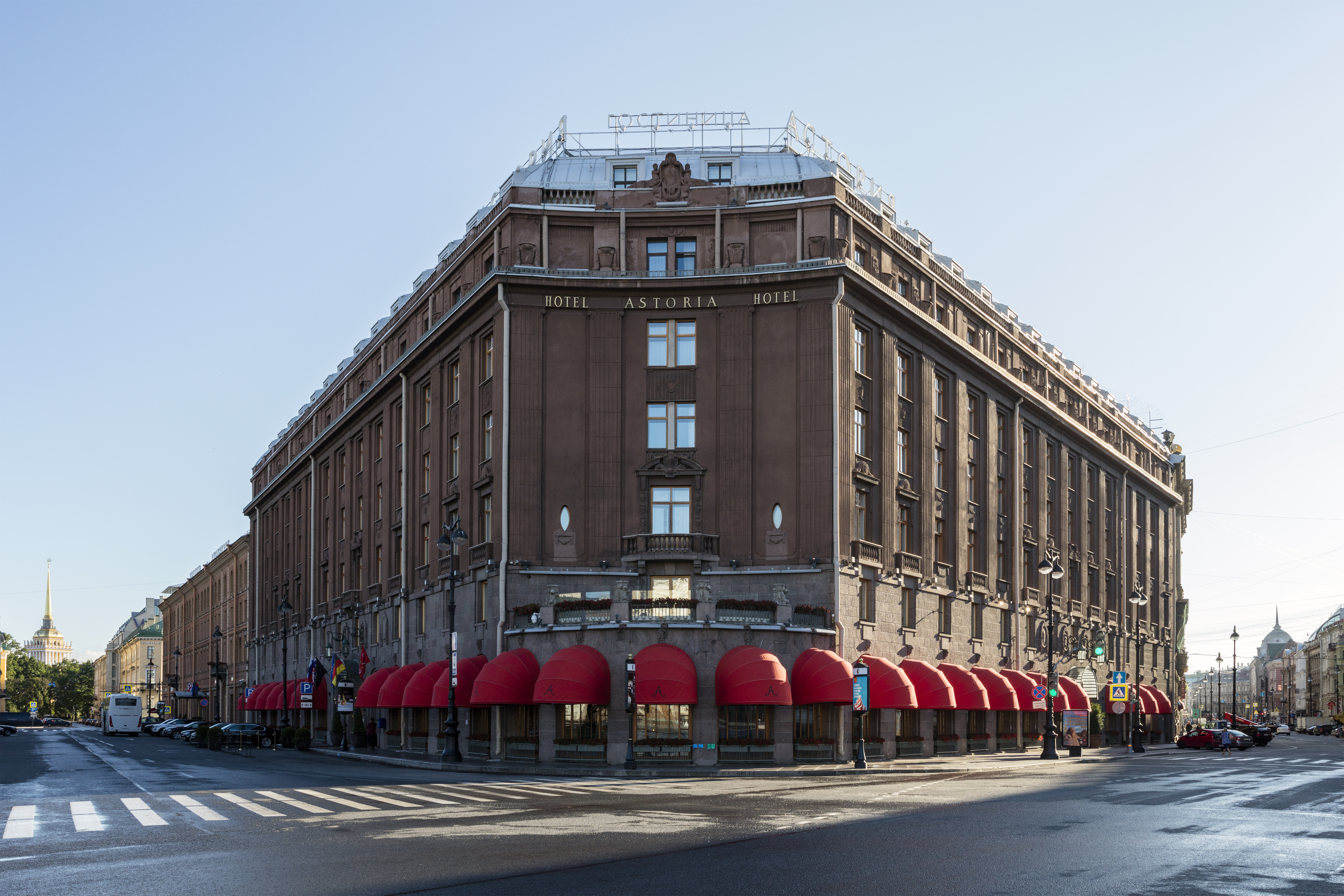
Hotel Astoria

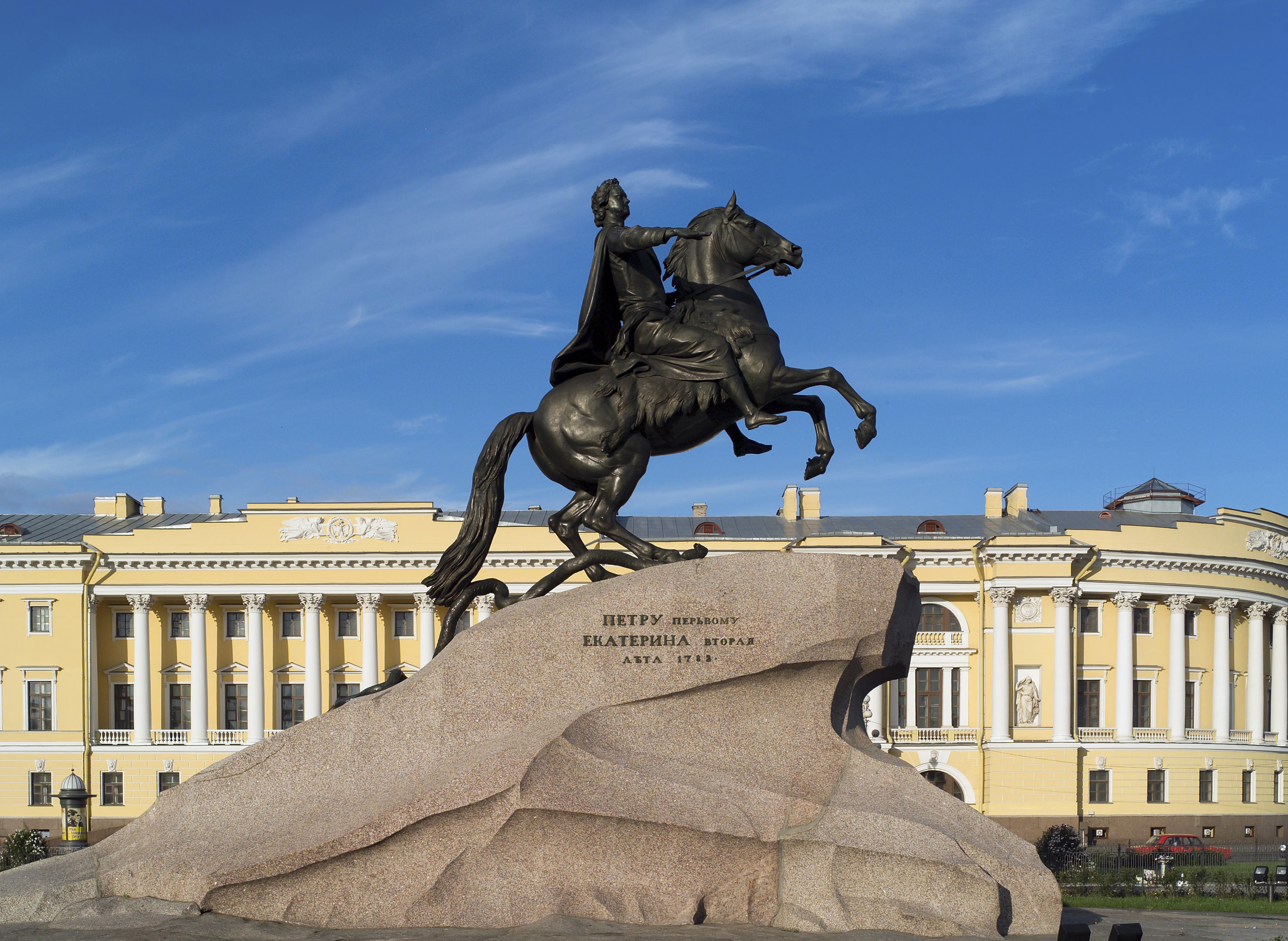
The Bronze Horseman

- Angleterre Hotel
- Corinthia Hotel St. Petersburg
- Grand Hotel Europe
- Hotel Astoria
- Lobanov-Rostovsky Palace
- Novotel Saint Petersburg Centre
- Oktyabrskaya Hotel
- Saint Petersburg (hotel, Saint Petersburg)

=== Monuments and memorials ===
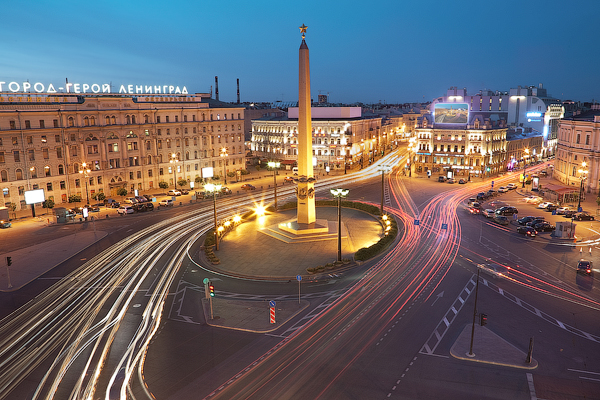
The Leningrad Hero City Obelisk

- Alexander Column
- Bronze Horseman
- Chesme Column
- Column of Glory
- Green Belt of Glory
- Leningrad Hero City Obelisk
- Monument to the Fighters of the Revolution
- Monument to Nicholas I
- Monument to Nizami Ganjavi in Saint Petersburg
- Monument to Peter I (Peter and Paul Fortress)
- Monument to Peter I (St. Michael's Castle)
- Rimsky-Korsakov Monument
- Solovetsky Stone

=== Palaces and villas ===
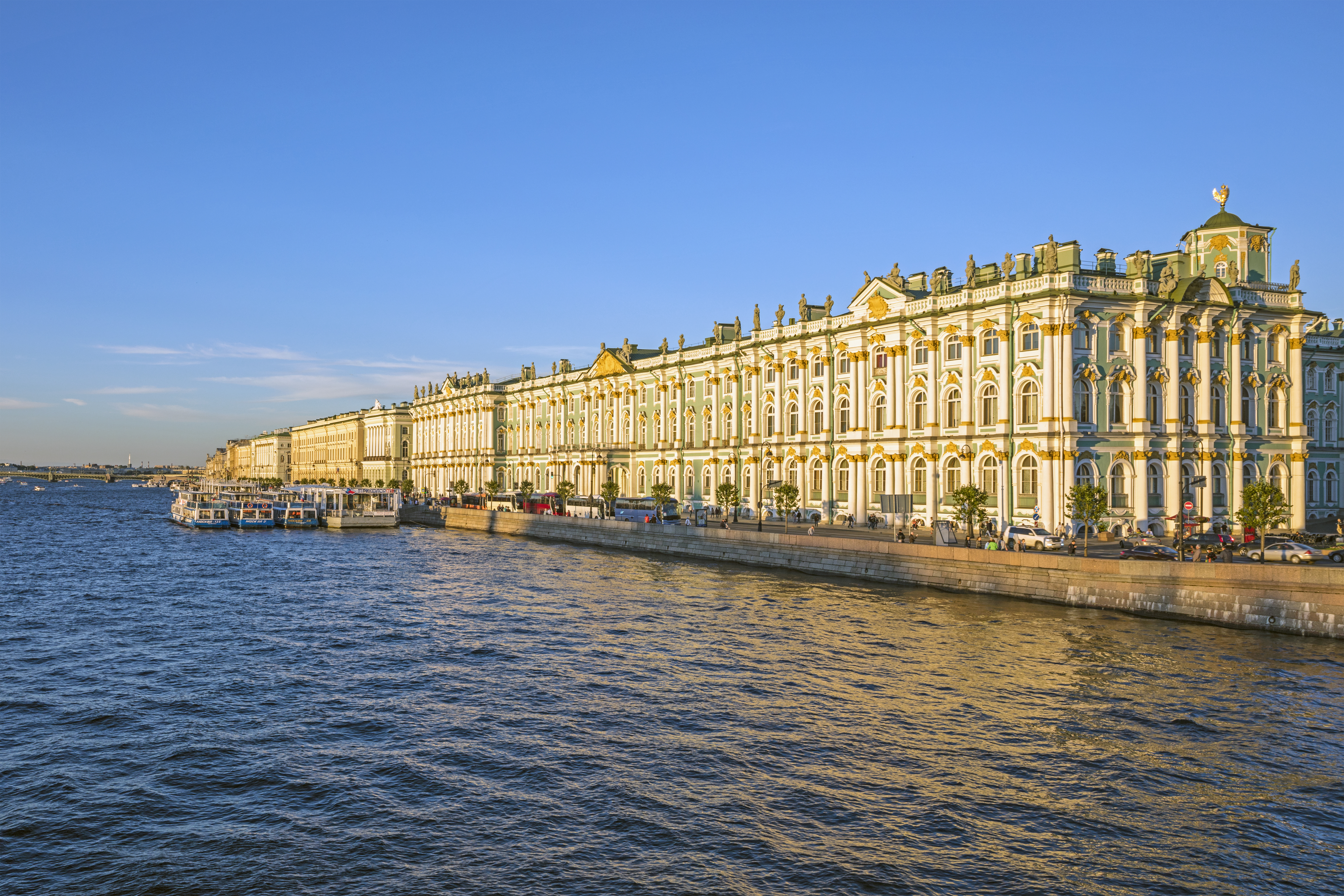
The Winter Palace

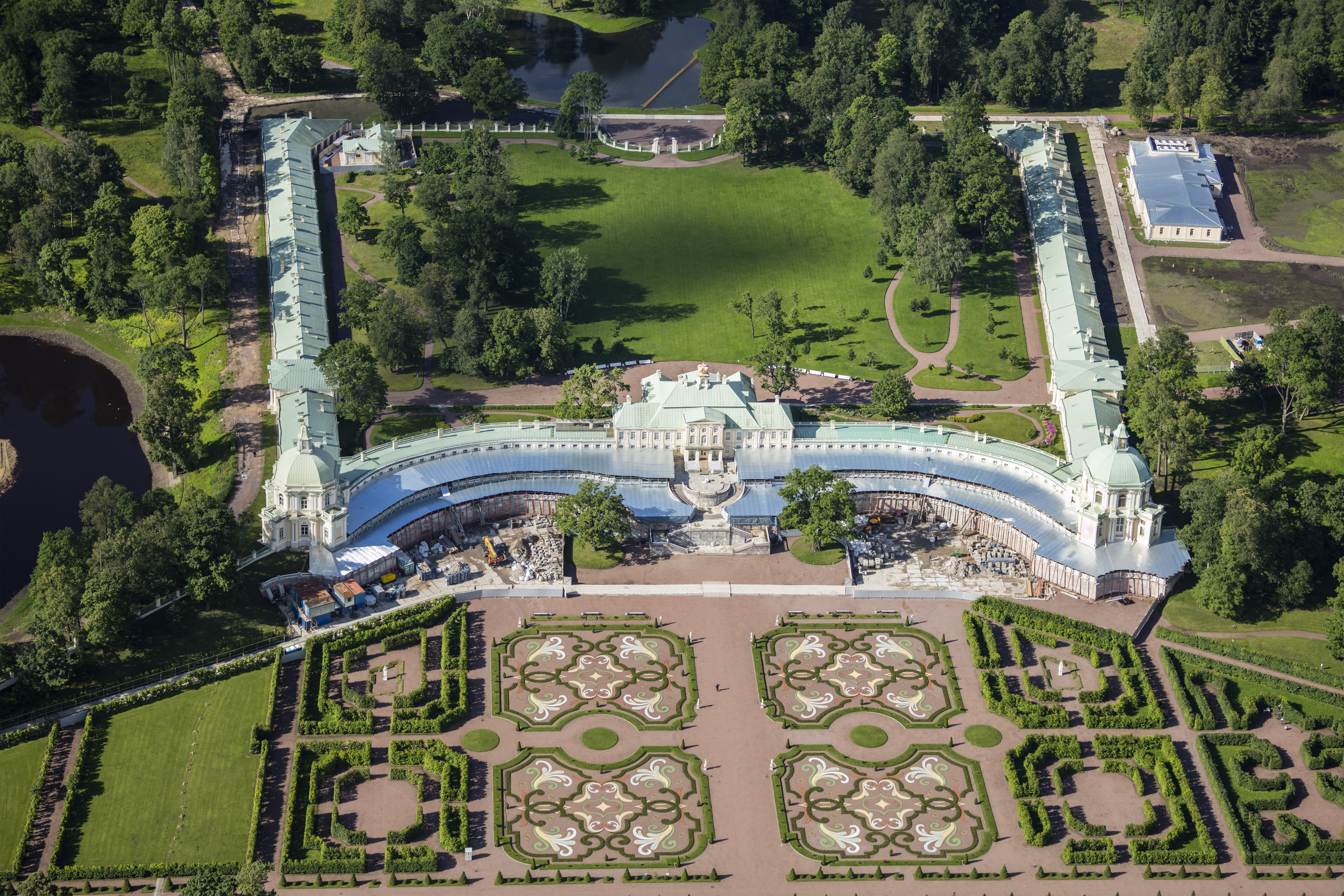
Oranienbaum, the Grand Menshikov Palace

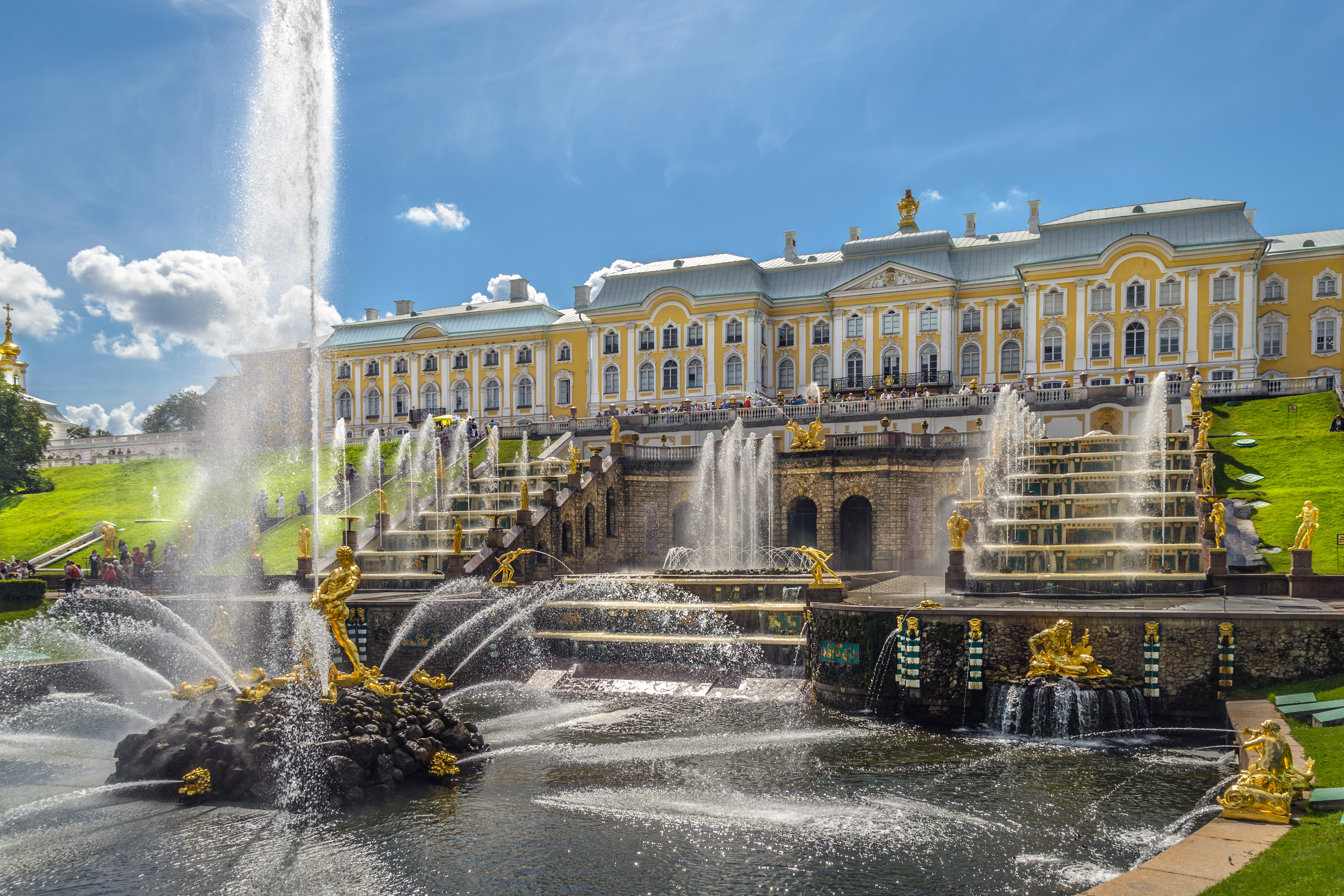
Peterhof Palace

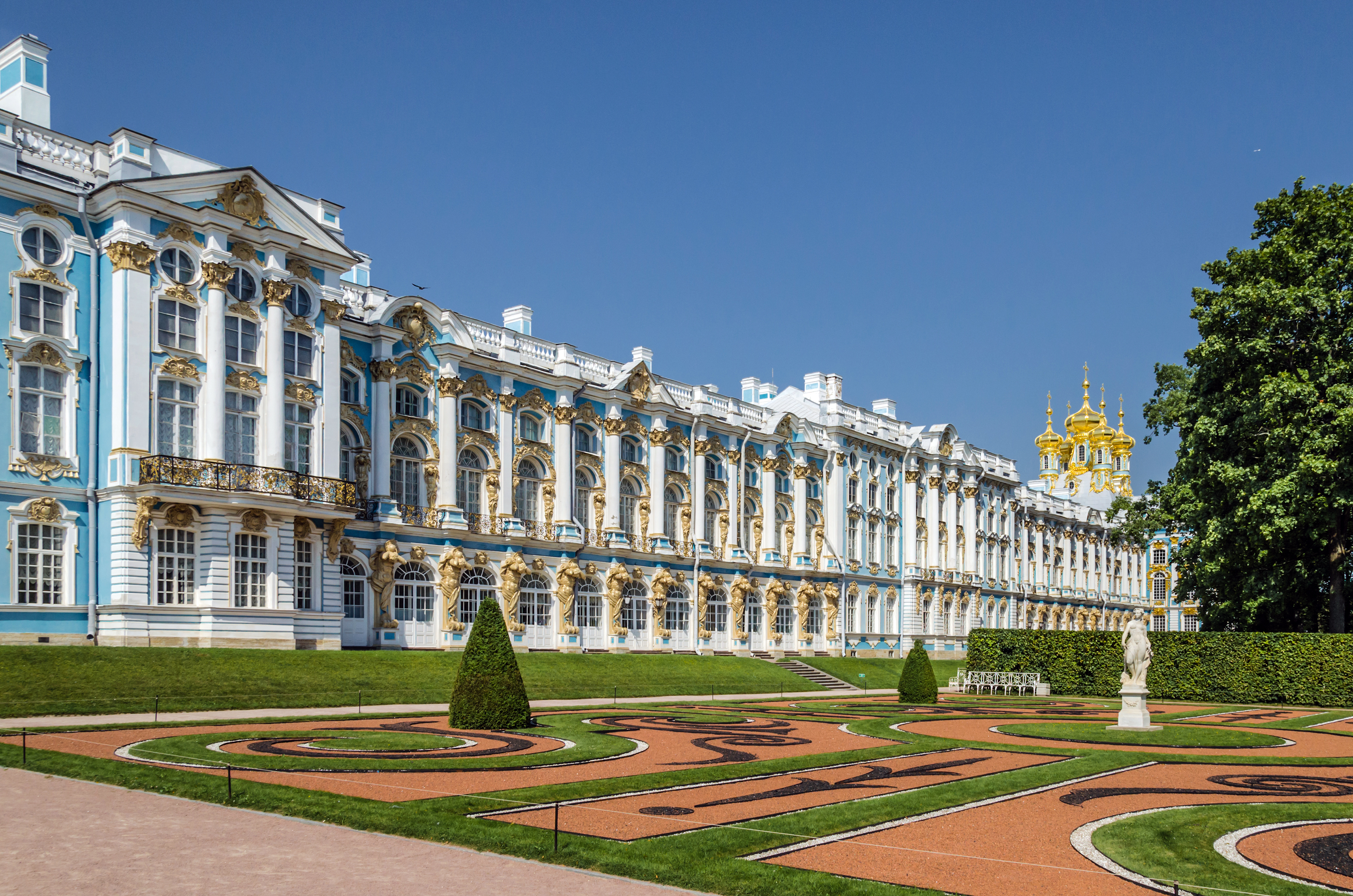
Catherine Palace in Tsarskoye Selo

- Alexis Palace
- Anichkov Palace
- Beloselsky-Belozersky Palace
- Gatchina Palace
- Kamenny Island Palace
- Kikin Hall
- Lobanov-Rostovsky Palace
- Marble Palace
- Mariinsky Palace
- Menshikov Palace
- Moika Palace
- Naryshkin-Shuvalov Palace
- Nevsky Prospect 86
- New Michael Palace
- Nicholas Palace
- Oranienbaum
- Pavlovsk Palace
- Peterhof Palace
  - Monplaisir Palace
  - Peterhof Grand Palace
- Saint Michael's Castle
- Saltykov Mansion
- Shuvalov Mansion
- Stroganov Palace
- Summer Palace
- Summer Palace of Peter the Great
- Tauride Palace
- Tsarskoye Selo
  - Alexander Palace
  - Catherine Palace
    - Amber Room
  - Sophia Cathedral
  - Tsarskoye Selo Lyceum
- Vladimir Palace
- Vorontsov Palace
- Winter Palace
  - Neva Enfilade of the Winter Palace
  - Private Apartments of the Winter Palace
- Yelagin Palace

=== Shopping malls and markets ===
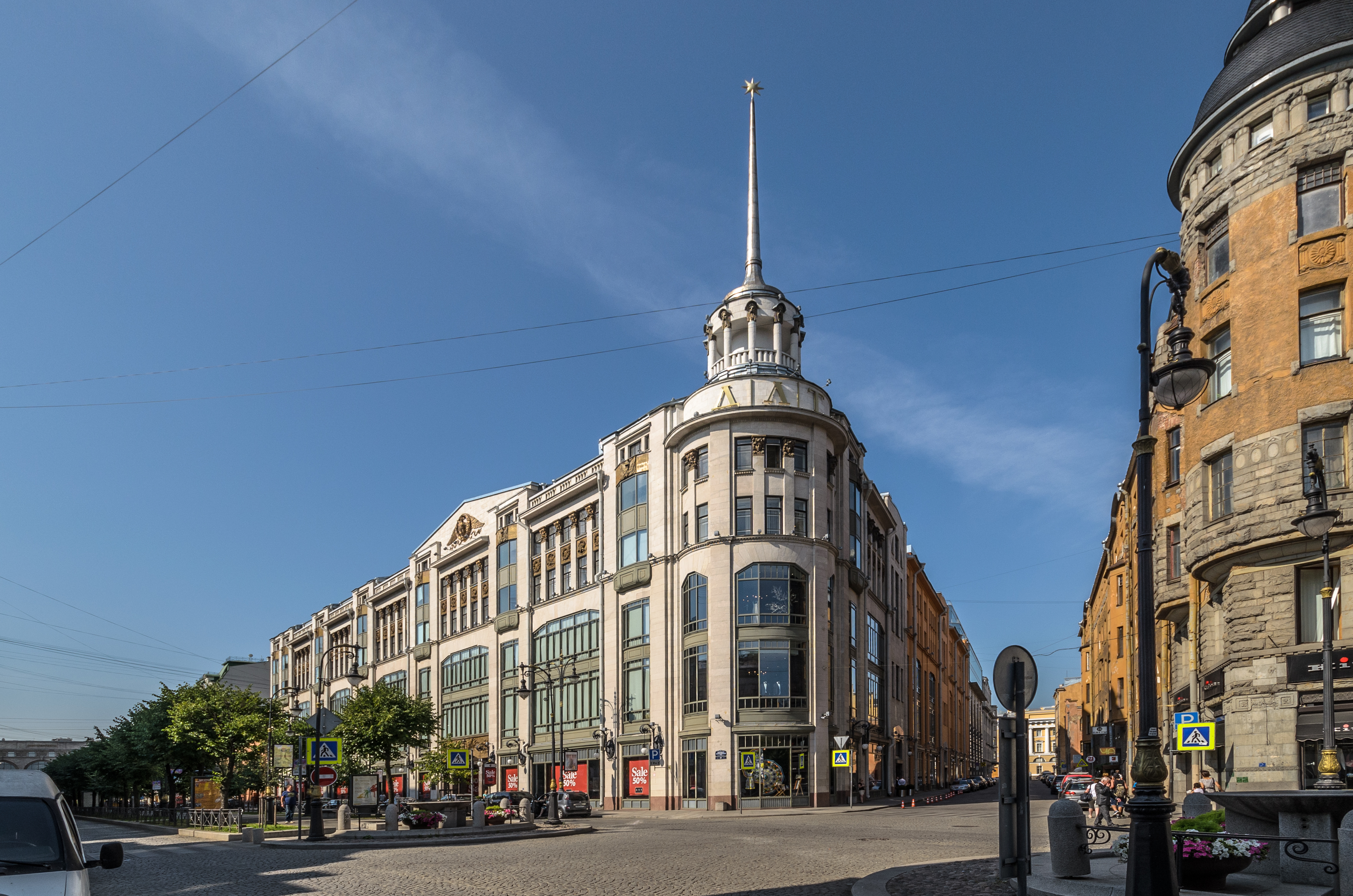
The DLT department store

- Apraksin Dvor
- DLT
- Galeria
- Great Gostiny Dvor
- Nikolsky Market
- Passage

=== Sports venues ===
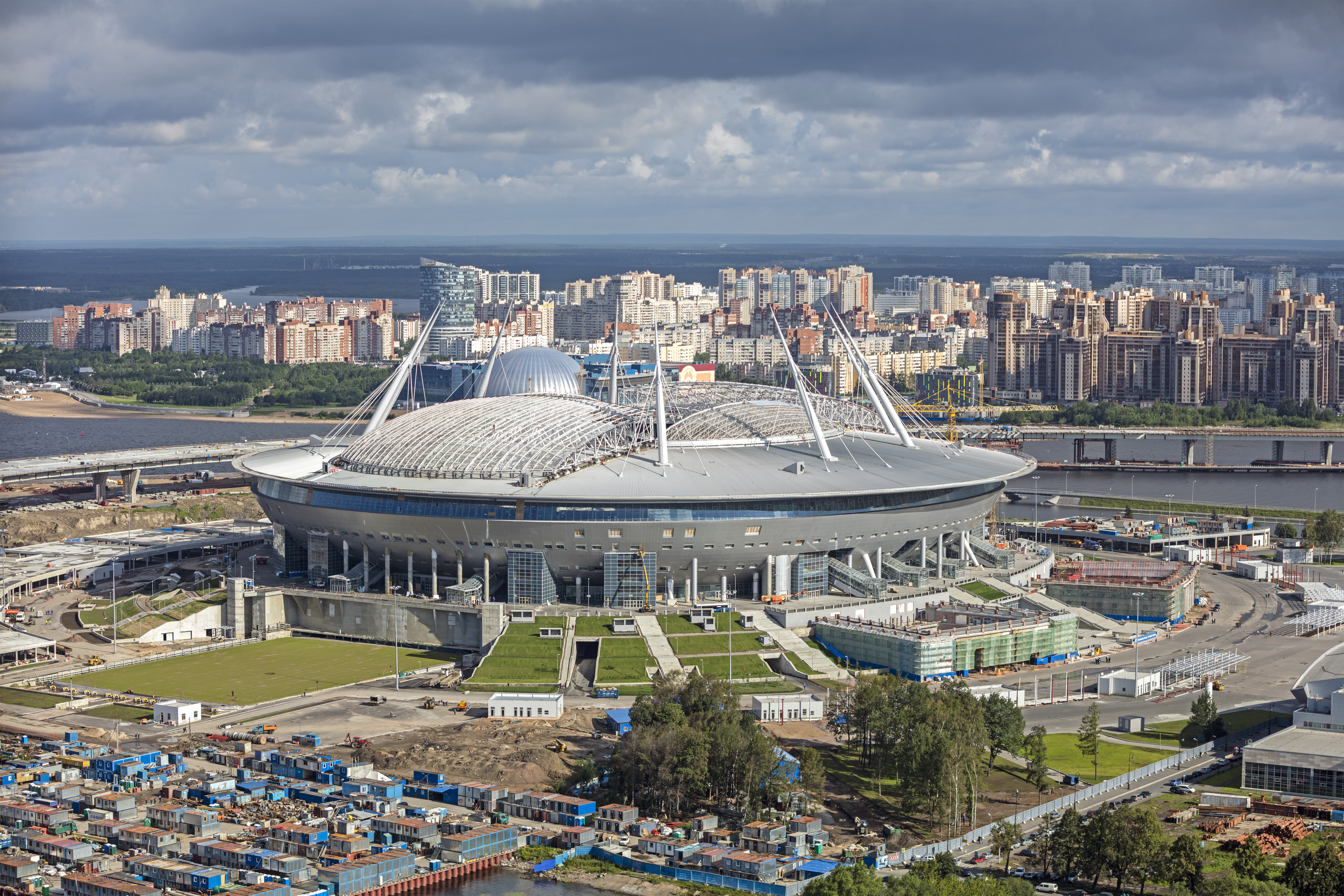
Krestovsky Stadium

- Ice Palace
- Krestovsky Stadium
- Petrovsky Stadium
- Saint Petersburg Sports and Concert Complex
- Yubileyny Sports Palace

=== Theatres ===
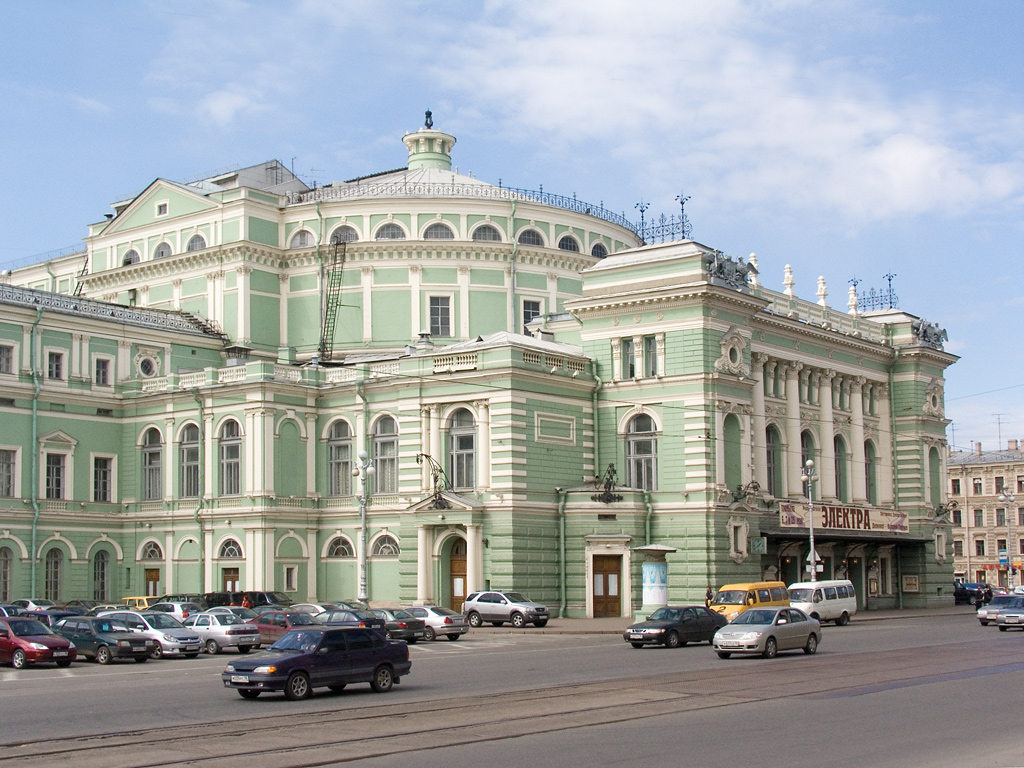
The Mariinsky Theatre

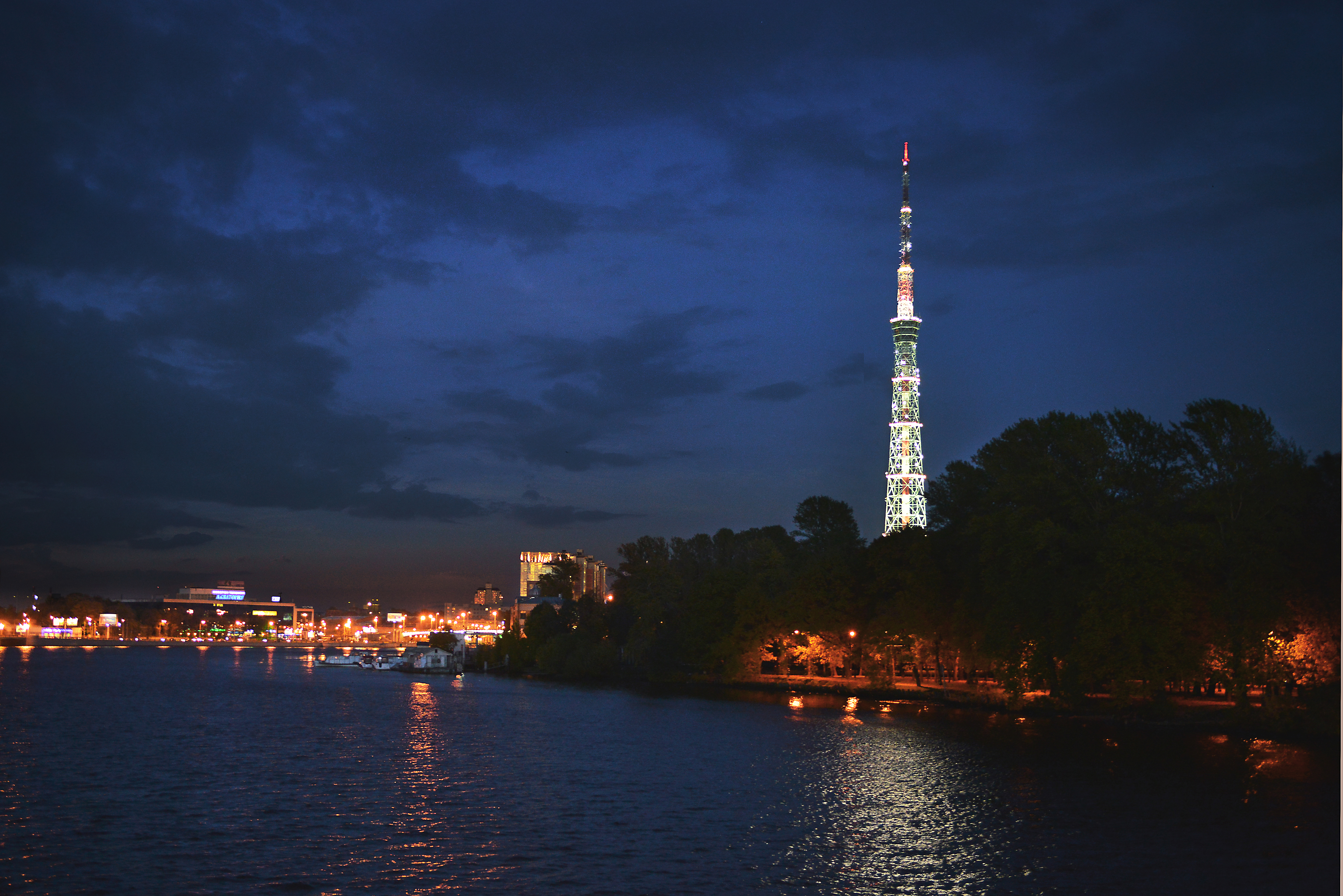
Saint Petersburg TV Tower

- Alexandrinsky Theatre
- Baltic House Festival Theatre
- Bolshoi Theatre
- Hermitage Theatre
- Kamenny Island Theatre
- Komedianty Theatre
- Liteiny Theatre
- Mariinsky Theatre
- Ostrov Theatre
- Saint Petersburg Comedy Theatre
- Tovstonogov Bolshoi Drama Theater
- Youth Theatre on the Fontanka
- Zazerkalie

=== Towers ===
- Griffins' tower
- Lesnoy Mole Rear Range Light
- Pevcheskaya Tower
- Ruin Tower
- Saint Petersburg TV Tower

== See also ==
- Timeline of Saint Petersburg
