= St. Julian's Church, Pushkin =

Church in Pushkin, Russia

Coordinates: 59°42′24″N 30°24′14″E

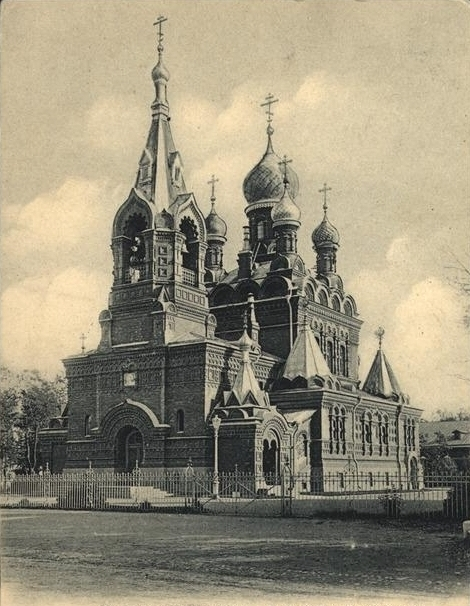
St. Julian's Church in 1900

St. Julian's Church is an Orthodox church in Pushkin (Tsarskoye Selo), near Saint Petersburg in Russia. It was the church of His Majesty's Cuirassiers Life Guards Regiment of the Russian Imperial Guard. The current building was built from 1895 to 1899, and was designed by the architects V.N. Kuritsyn and S.A. Danini. The temple was built in memory of the wedding of Emperor Nicholas II and Empress Alexandra Feodorovna.

== History ==
The church was built in 1899 and dedicated to St. Julian of Tarsus whose feast is on July 21.

The church was given back to the Orthodox Community in 1995.
