= Belozerovs' House =

- Дом Белозёровых
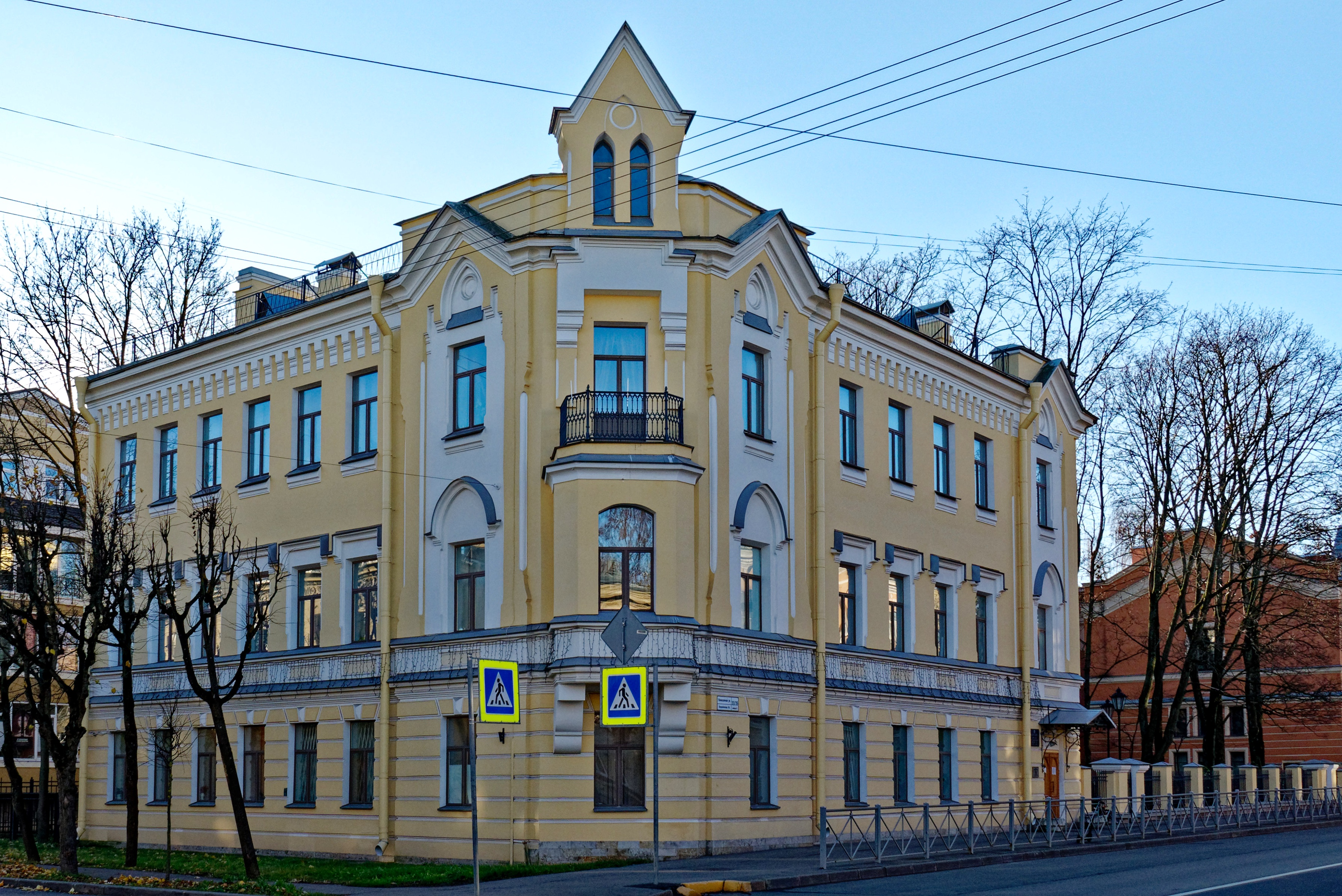
- Interactive map of the Belozerovs' House area

General information
- Architectural style: Eclecticism
- Location: Pushkin, 33/35 Konushennaya Street
- Coordinates: 59°43′14″N 30°24′52″E
- Completed: 1890s

Belozerovs' House is a building of the historical significance in Pushkin, Saint Petersburg. It was built during the 1890s. It has since been registered as a cultural heritage object. The building is located on 33/35 Konushennaya Street.

== History ==
Merchant AS Belozerov, who owned the site, in 1885 ordered a two-story house project to the architect A. Goman, but the project was not implemented. The architect of the current three-story house is unknown, possibly participation of SA Danini. The house was built in the 1890s. (at that time the daughter-in-law was owned by the daughter-in-law of merchant MF Belozyorova), already in 1899 (according to other sources - in 1897) he was leased to accommodate a two-class women's parochial school, it lasted until 1917. Also in the house was a one-class primary male parish school. After the Great Patriotic War, the house became residential. In 2003-2004, the house was reconstructed with complete replacement of the floors and redevelopment for the placement of children's music school No. 45.

== Architecture ==
The house Belozerova brick, in three floors, L-shaped in plan. The walls are plastered, the first floor is rustic, the basement is lined with limestone. The front facade (along Konyushennaya street) six axes wide, has two lateral rezalitas. The corner of the house is underlined by a bay window in the level of the second floor and gabled completion. From Konyushennaya street to the house adjoins a historic forged fence on a stone foundation. Not preserved attic, visible in old photos.

== Literature ==
- Семенова Г. В. (2009). Царское Село: знакомое и незнакомое. М.: Центрполиграф. pp. 382–383. ISBN 978-5-9524-4249-8.

== Sources ==
- "Конюшенная 35. Женское городское училище". Энциклопедия Царского Села. Archived from the original on 2018-07-12.
- "Дом Белозеровых". citywalls.ru.
