= Griffins' tower =

Tower in Saint Petersburg

Coordinates: 59°56′17″N 30°17′01″E

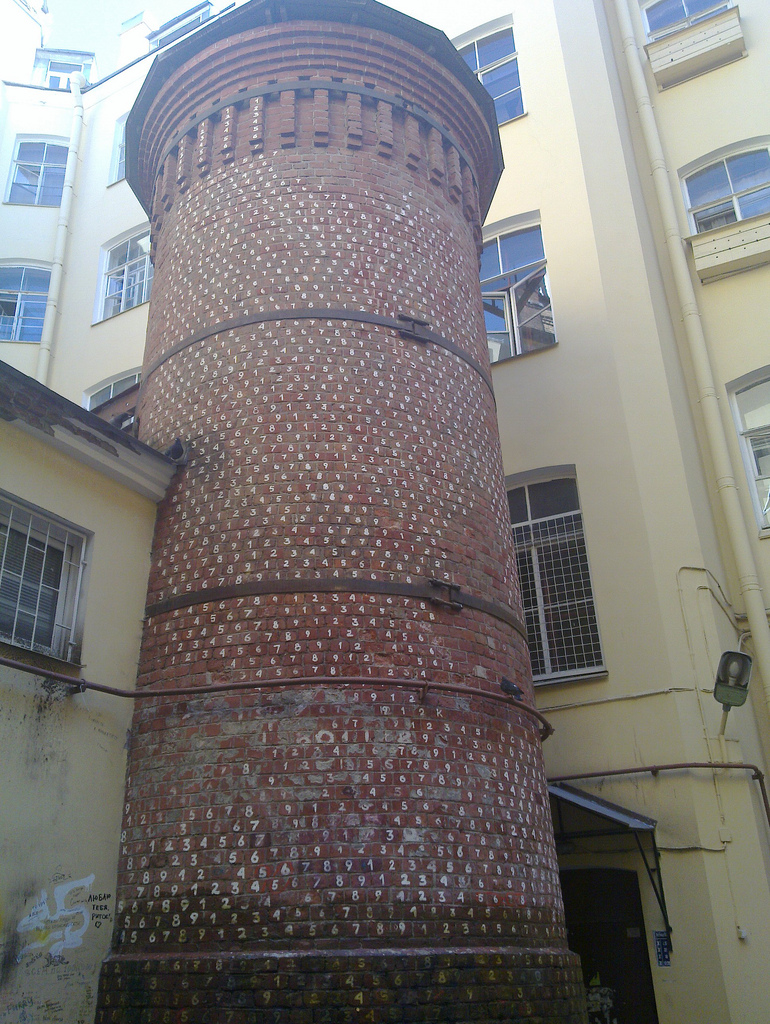
Griffins' Tower

Griffins' tower (Russian: Башня грифонов) is a red-brick tower situated in one of the yards on Vasilyevsky Island in Saint Petersburg. It used to be a part of a 19th-century pharmacy factory run by famous pharmacist and alchemist Wilhelm Poehl (sometimes written William Pell). The tower is around 11 m high and 2 m wide and has no windows or doors. Almost every brick of the tower is numbered. The mysterious code and unusual location at the pharmacy yard caused numerous legends about the tower.

== Legends ==
The most common legend about the tower is connected with its original owner Wilhelm Poehl, who was believed as not only a royal pharmacist but also an alchemist. In his free time he used the tower to incubate magic griffins. According to the legend the griffins were invisible and could be only seen reflected in windows at midnight. The numbers on bricks constitute a magic code and those who could decrypt the code could solve the Universal mysteries.

== History ==
The tower likely was connected to the 19th century pharmacy and was a chimney for its laboratory. On 1 May 1994 the artist Alexey Kostroma and his project "Tut-i-Tam" installed a huge egg on the top of the tower and numbered the walls. The installation was called "the egg monument" and it was related to match of two holidays: Easter and International Workers' Day. The monument expressed the unity of workers, artists and religious people. The egg was stolen several times and installed again until it disappeared forever.

The code at the same time represented the process of overall inventory which took place in the 1990s in Russia. The artist wanted to protect the tower giving it an official number.
