= Demidov Bridge =

Bridge in Saint Petersburg, Russia

Demidov Bridge Демидов Мост
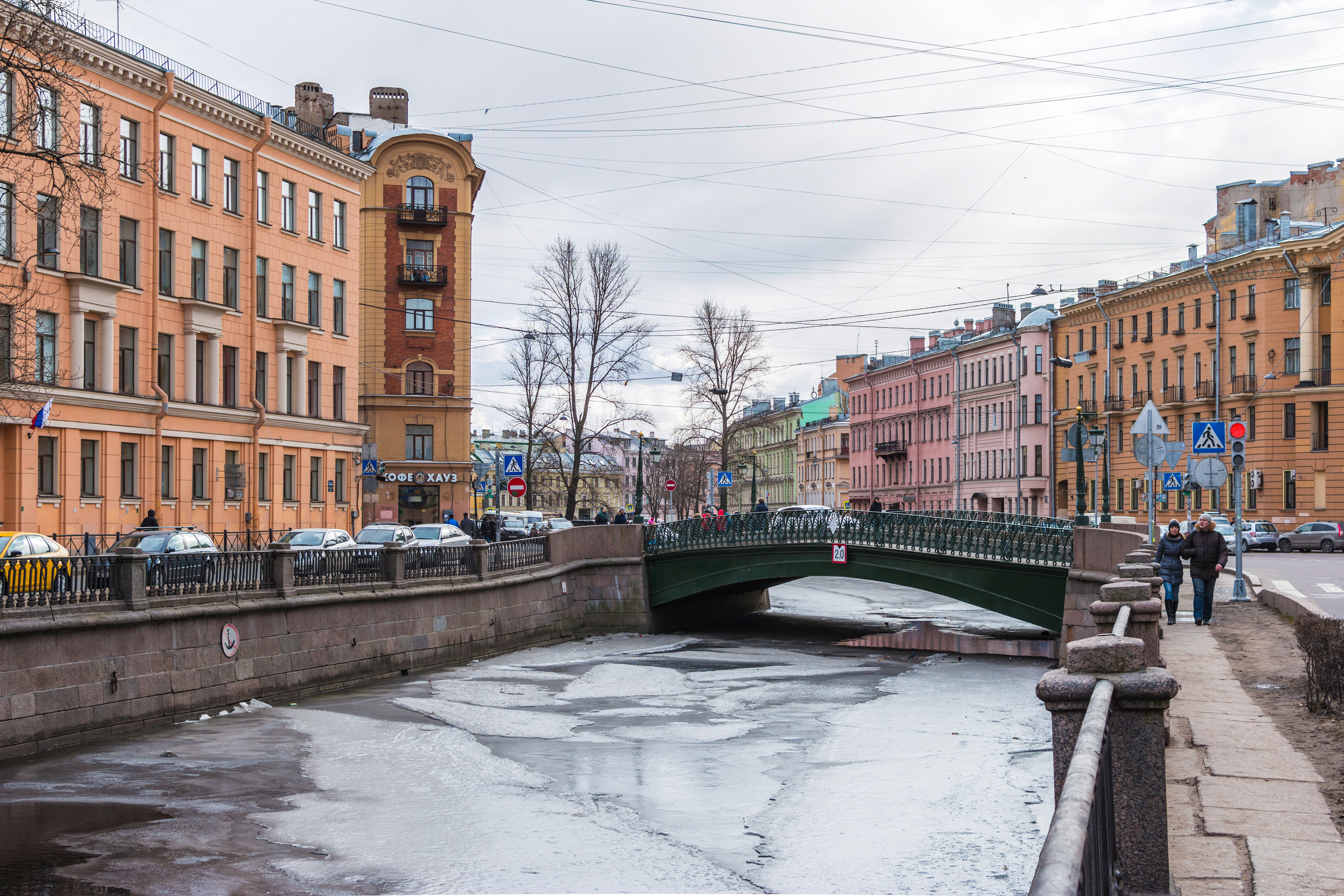
- Coordinates: 59°55′43″N 30°18′56″E
- Crosses: Griboyedov Canal
- Locale: Saint Petersburg

Characteristics
- Design: Arch Bridge
- Total length: 33 m
- Width: 16.09 m

History
- Opened: 1835

The Demidov Bridge (Russian: Демидов мост) is a bridge across the Griboyedov Canal in Saint Petersburg, Russia. It connects Kazansky and Spassky islands.

== Name ==
The bridge was named from a famous Russian noble family Demidovs, whose member Nikolai Nikitich Demidov also financed it. It connects two parts of the former Demidov street (today Grivtzov street), named after Demidov family which owned land nearby. Initially it was planned to name the bridge Bank Bridge, but this name was already taken by a pedestrian bridge crossing the canal near the former Russian Assignation Bank.

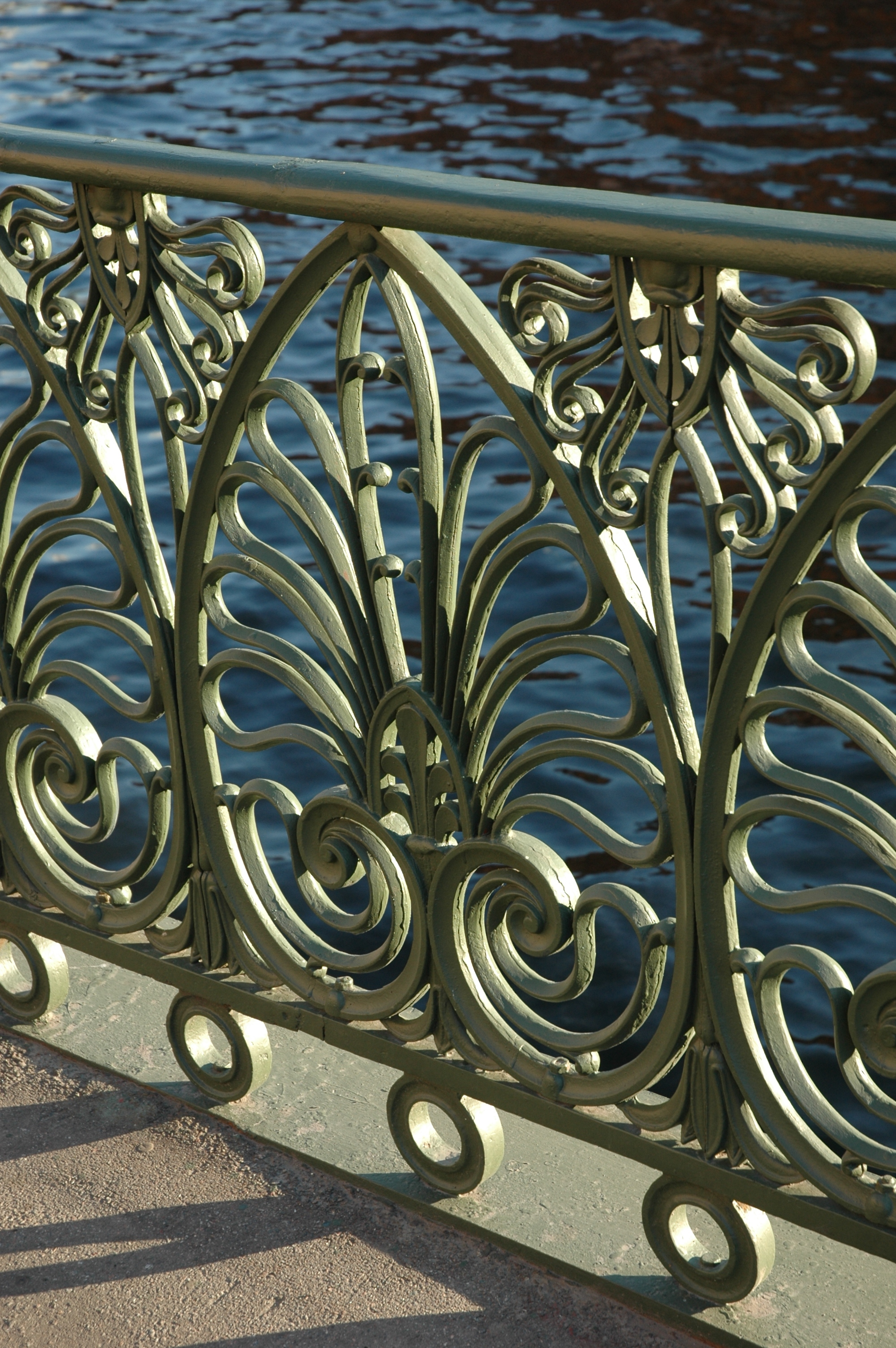
Demidov Bridge railings

== History ==
In the beginning of the 18th century, on the site of the modern Demidov Bridge, existed a wooden bridge named Saarsky Bridge, since it was on the road leading to Tsarskoe Selo.

Between 1834 and 1835 the single-span arched cast iron bridge was constructed by engineers E.A. Adam and Pierre-Dominique Bazaine. The arched span of the bridge consisted of 91 cast iron boxes, which were fastened by bolts. Bridge supports were made from stone, coated by granite.

== Decorations ==
The iron castings of the bridge railings are artistically of high level. The ornament is palmette, an artistic motif based on the fan-shaped leaves of a palm tree. The bridge entrance features lamp posts. In 1954–1955 the restoration project took place under the supervision of architect A.L. Rotach. The lost lamps, poles and railing fragments were replaced.

Several houses near the bridge have special memorial plaques on their facades, commemorating the level of the water during the catastrophic flooding on November 7, 1824, described by Pushkin in the Bronze Horseman poem.
