= Malo-Kalinkin Bridge =

Bridge in Saint Petersburg, Russia

Malo-Kalinkin Bridge Мало-Калинкин мост
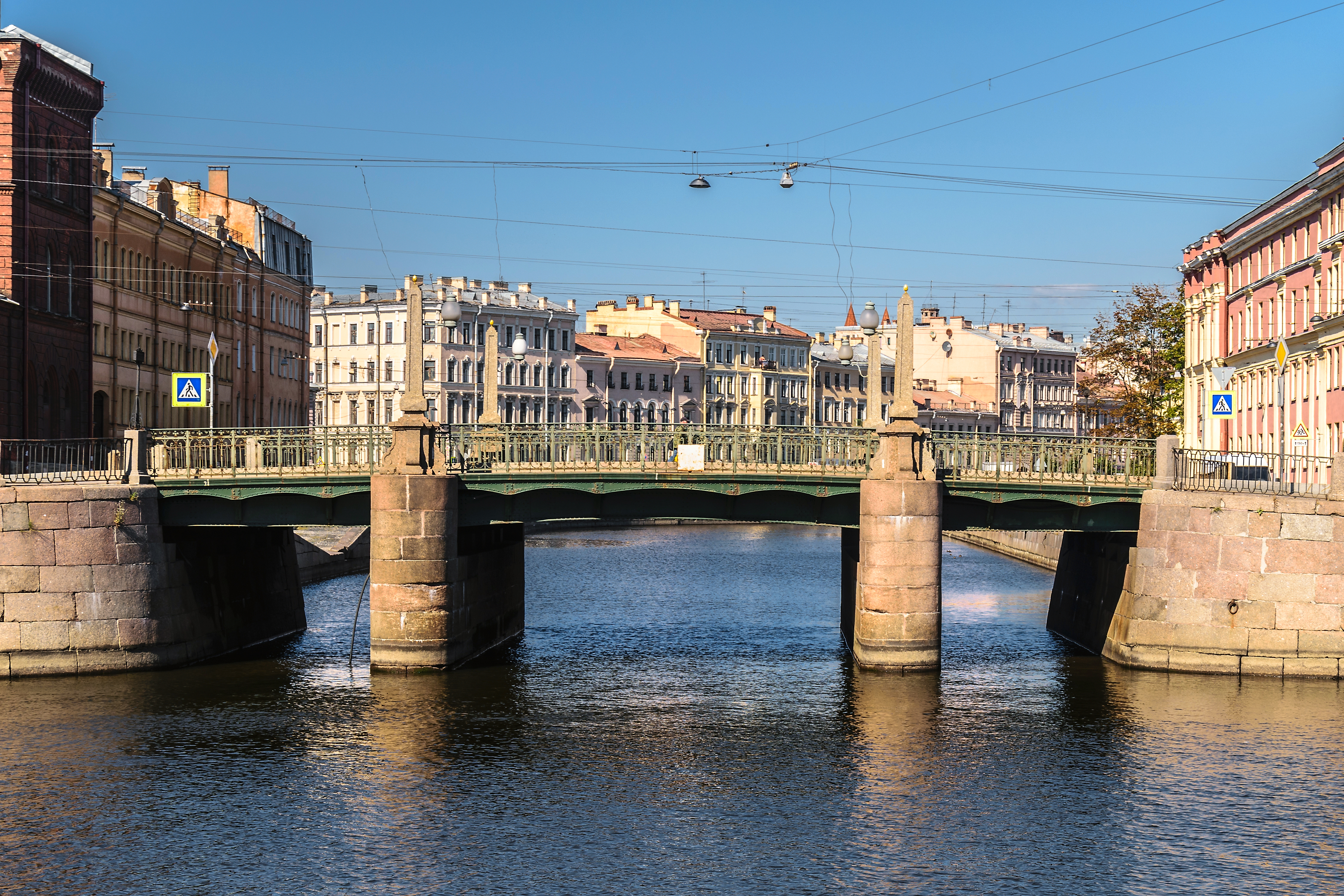
- Malo-Kalinkin bridge in 2015
- Coordinates: 59°55′00″N 30°16′52″E
- Crosses: Griboyedov Canal
- Locale: Saint Petersburg

Characteristics
- Total length: 27,7 m
- Width: 16,22 m

History
- Opened: 1789

The Malo-Kalinkin Bridge is a bridge in Saint-Petersburg, which connects Kolomna Island and Pokrovsky Island, spanning the Griboyedov Canal. It was built in 1783 by engineer I. Borisov, at the same time that the granite embankments of the canal were being constructed.

== History ==
The name of the bridge is that of Kalinkina village, which was situated at the bridge's location in the 18th century.

The design of the bridge is similar to that of the Pikalov Bridge and other bridges downstream along the Griboyedov Canal; being a three-span wooden bridge with granite piers, with an adjustable middle span. In 1808, the bridge was rebuilt with the width of the deck being increased from 10 metres (33 ft) to 16.22 metres (53.2 ft). The stone pillars were repaired by the dismantling of masonry within two rows of the granite cladding, and the subsequent driving additional piles to better support the bridge.

In the second half of the 19th century the movable middle span of the bridge was replaced. In 1908, in connection with the laying rails for tram routes, the bridge was widened and metal support beams were installed instead of the original wooden beams, but the historical appearance of the bridge was preserved. In 1952 and 1970, lanterns and granite obelisks were restored on the bridge piers as part of a project undertaken by architect A. L. Rotach.

In 2007 the results of a major overhaul of the bridge were presented by engineer Vyacheslav Shlyakhin:

- Light fixtures with lamps and obelisks on the channel supports were restored as replicas of those from the bridge's 1808 appearance.
- The foundation of the bridge was strengthened.
- Part of the bridge's lattice, earlier destroyed as a result of a transport accident, was restored.
- The base of the tram rails running across the bridge was replaced with a reinforced concrete slab, with accompanying restoration of the roadway.

== In Literature ==
The bridge is mentioned in Nikolai Gogol's short story, « The Overcoat. » The main character, Akaky Akakievich —or a certain clerk— is rumored to appear as a ghost near the bridge, searching for his stolen overcoat.
