= Kokushkin Bridge =

Bridge in Saint Petersburg, Russia

Kokushkin Bridge Кокушкин мост
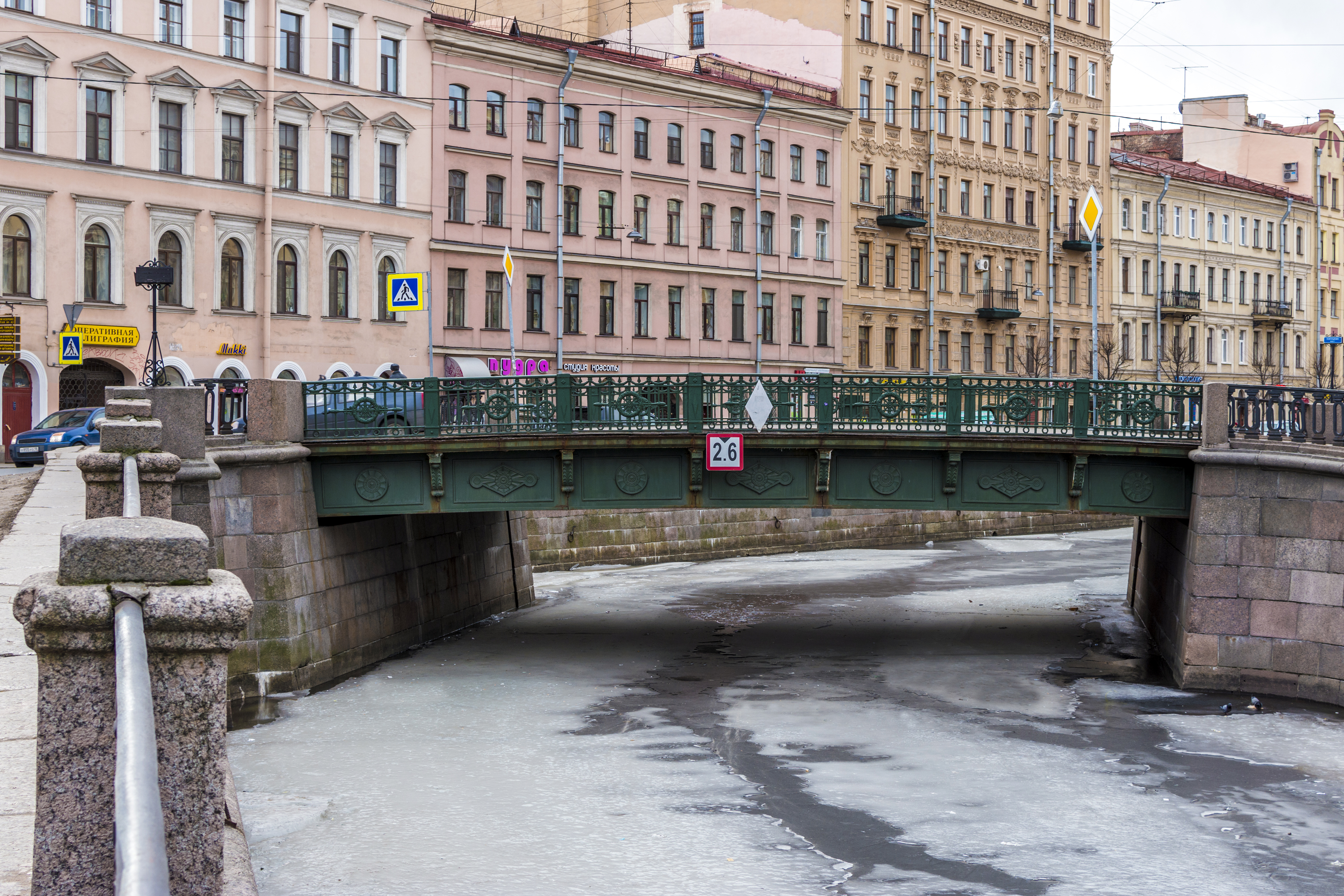
- Coordinates: 59°55′33″N 30°18′49″E
- Carries: traffic, pedestrian
- Crosses: Griboedov Canal
- Locale: Saint Petersburg

Characteristics
- Design: Arch Bridge
- Total length: 18.9 m
- Width: 13.1 m

History
- Opened: 1790 (wooden), 1947

Location
- Interactive map of Kokushkin Bridge; Кокушкин мост

The Kokushkin Bridge (Russian: Кокушкин мост) is a bridge across the Griboedov Canal in Saint Petersburg, Russia.

== History ==
The bridge got its name from the merchant Vasily Kokushkin, whose house was located at the corner of Kokushkin Alley and Sadovaya Street. From 1786 to 1796, the name was spelled Kokushkinov Bridge and from 1801 to 1853 the bridge was mistakenly called Kukushkin Bridge (meaning Cuckoo Bridge in Russian). Until 1872, the official name of the bridge could be written both as Kokushkin and as Kakushkin.

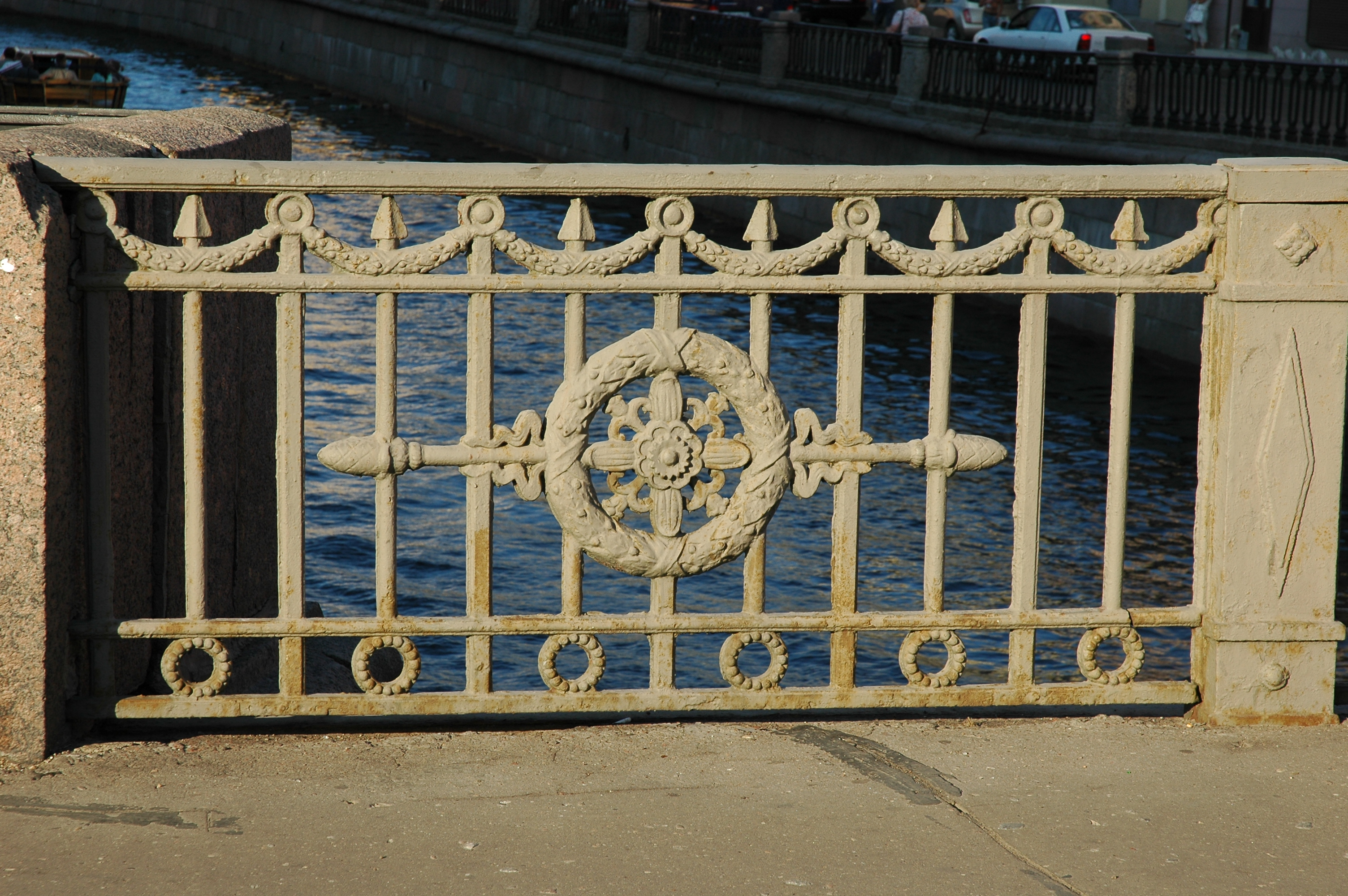
Section of the railings

The first wooden bridge at that location was built in 1790. It underwent major restoration in 1872, when, the span of the bridge was replaced with an exact replica, so the bridge preserved the same appearance.

In 1946-1947, the bridge was replaced with a new one, by engineer B.B.Levin and architect L.A.Noskov. The old supports were completely dismantled, and the new ones were set in their place. The wooden span was replaced with a steel one consisting of eight welded beams.

New cast iron railings were installed on the bridge. The abutments of the railings resemble these on the canal's embankment.

== The bridge in literature ==
While the bridge is not the most famous or picturesque, it is connected with some of the most prominent authors in Russian literature.

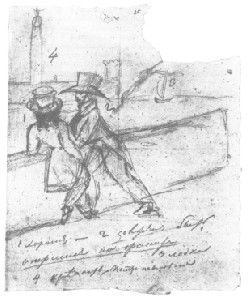
Pushkin's sketch representing himself and Onegin on Palace Quay.

In 1829, Alexander Pushkin mentioned Kokushkin bridge in a famous epigram. For the first edition of Eugene Onegin, the poet commissioned an illustration depicting himself and Onegin walking together along the quay. Upon receiving the illustration, which represented him leaning on a parapet with his back turned towards the Peter and Paul Fortress, he was exceedingly displeased with the result (which had little in common with his own preliminary sketch, illustrated to the right) and scribbled the following epigram underneath:

Here, after crossing Bridge Kokushkin,

With bottom on the granite propped,
Stands Aleksandr Sergeich Pushkin;
Near M'sieur Onegin he has stopped.

Ignoring with a look superior
The fateful Power's citadel,
On it he turns a proud posterior:

My dear chap, poison not the well!

— (translated by Vladimir Nabokov)

Fyodor Dostoevsky's Crime and Punishment starts with a mention of the bridge:

On an exceptionally hot evening early in July a young man came out of the garret in which he lodged in S. Place and walked slowly, as though in hesitation, towards K. bridge.

— F.Dostoevsky, Crime and Punishment

K. bridge here means Kokushkin bridge.

In Mikhail Lermontov's unfinished novel Shtoss, the main character, the artist Lugin, looks for Shtoss House near Kokushkin Bridge. It is conceivable that Lermontov took the actual Zverkov House as the prototype of Shtoss House. Zverkov House was a famous apartment house near Kokushkin Bridge.

In 1829, the then young and unknown Nikolai Gogol rented a room in that house, where he wrote Evenings on a Farm Near Dikanka, as commemorated by a plaque on the house. Gogol liked to place the characters in his writings in real locations that he had visited. In "Diary of a Madman", Gogol sends Poprishchin over the Kokushkin Bridge to the Zverkov House.

They passed into Gorokhovaya Street, turned into Meshcheanskaya and from there into Stolyarnaya Street; at last they reached Kokushkin Bridge and stopped in front of a big house. "I know that house." I said to myself. "That's Zverkov's Buildings".

— N. Gogol, "Diary of a Madman"
