= Pochtamtsky Bridge =

Bridge in Saint Petersburg, Russia

Coordinates: 59.9306°N 30.3007°E

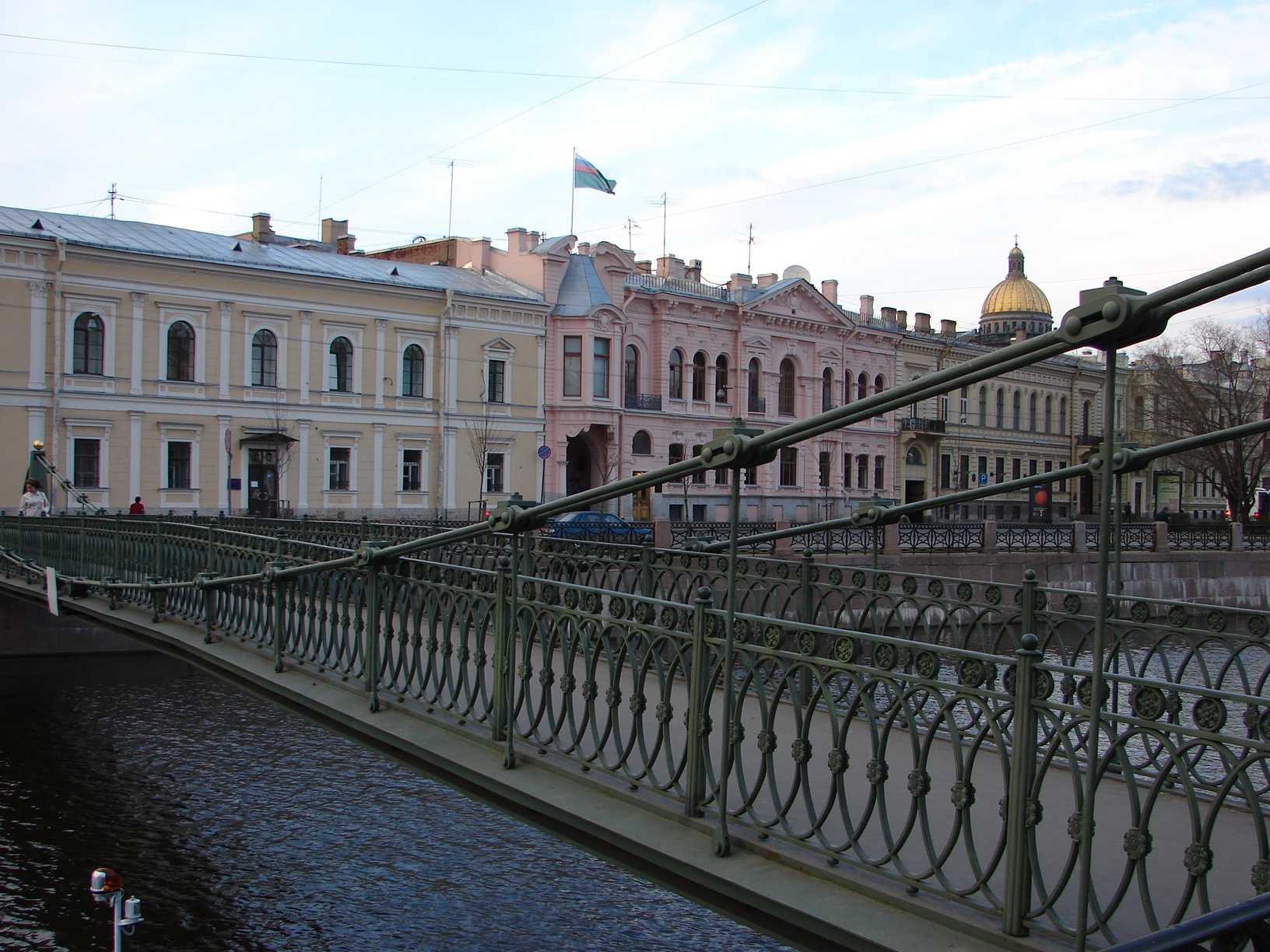

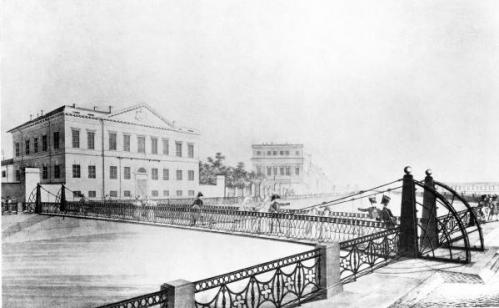
An 1820 lithography of Postoffice bridge

Postoffice Bridge (Russian: Почтамтский мост, Pochtamtskiy most) is a pedestrian bridge across Moika River in Saint Petersburg, Russia. It is located near the central Postoffice building, from which it takes the name.

The bridge was built in 1823-1824 to designs by architects Wilhelm von Traitteur and Christianovich as a pedestrian bridge suspended by chains. There are only three such bridges left in Saint Petersburg today, the other two being Lions Bridge and Bank Bridge. With the time the construction became unstable, and it was reengineered in 1936 by setting the additional support underneath it, so the chains became merely a decoration. In 1981-1983 the bridge was reconstructed yet again, and restored as a suspended bridge.
