= Sennoy Bridge =

Bridge in Saint Petersburg, Russia

Hay Bridge Сенной мост
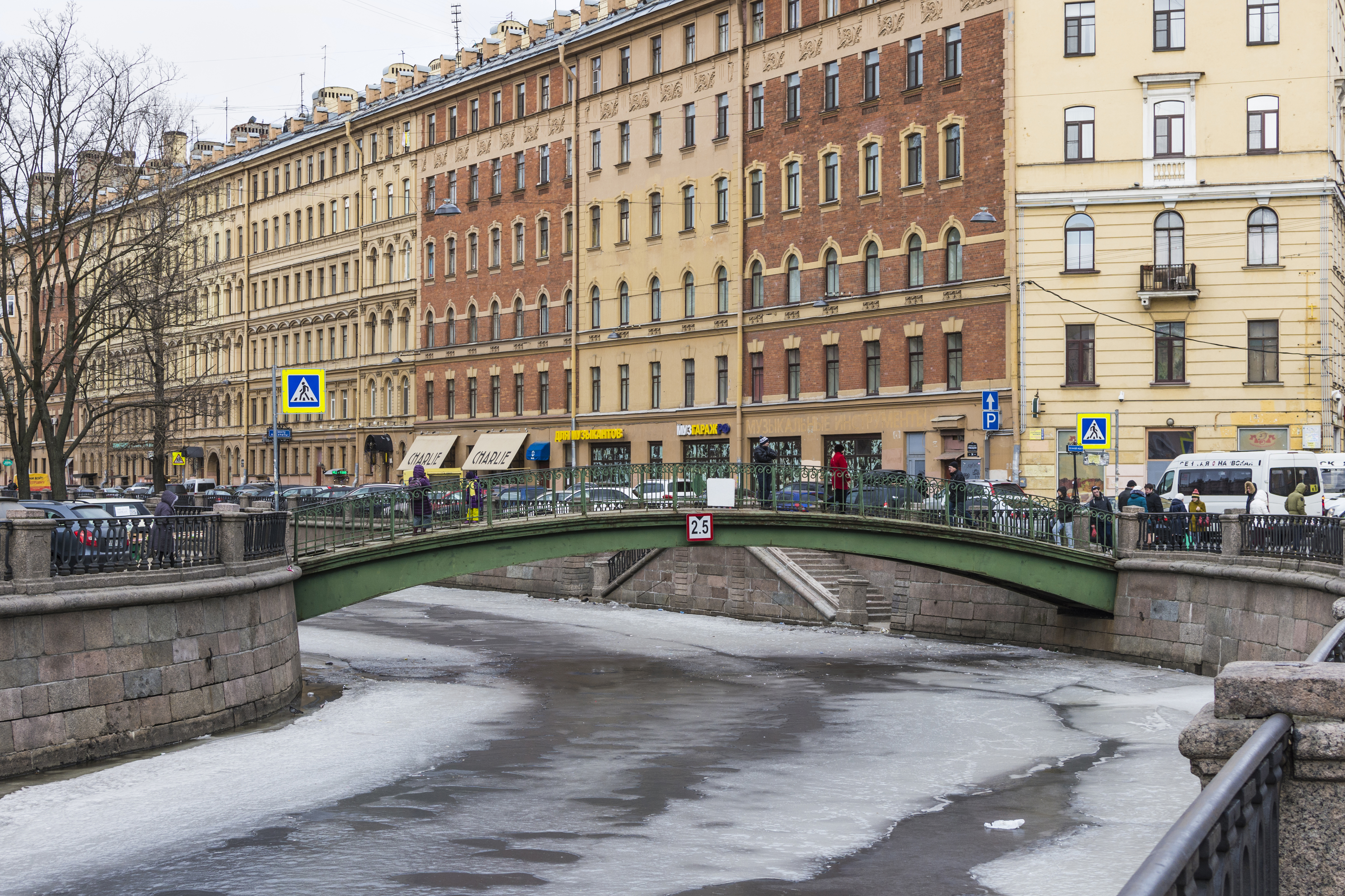
- Coordinates: 59°55′36″N 30°18′55″E
- Carries: pedestrian
- Crosses: Griboedov Canal
- Locale: Saint Petersburg

Characteristics
- Design: Arch Bridge
- Total length: 23 m
- Width: 2.3 m

History
- Opened: 1931 (wooden), 1952

The Hay Bridge (Russian: Сенной мост) is a bridge across the Griboedov Canal in Saint Petersburg, Russia.

== History ==
It was first built in 1931 as a single-span pedestrian bridge carrying heating pipes. In 1952, the main span was in need of emergency repair, and the bridge was fully rebuilt by the project of engineer P.B. Bazhenov as an elegant steel structure with cast iron railings.

== Gallery ==
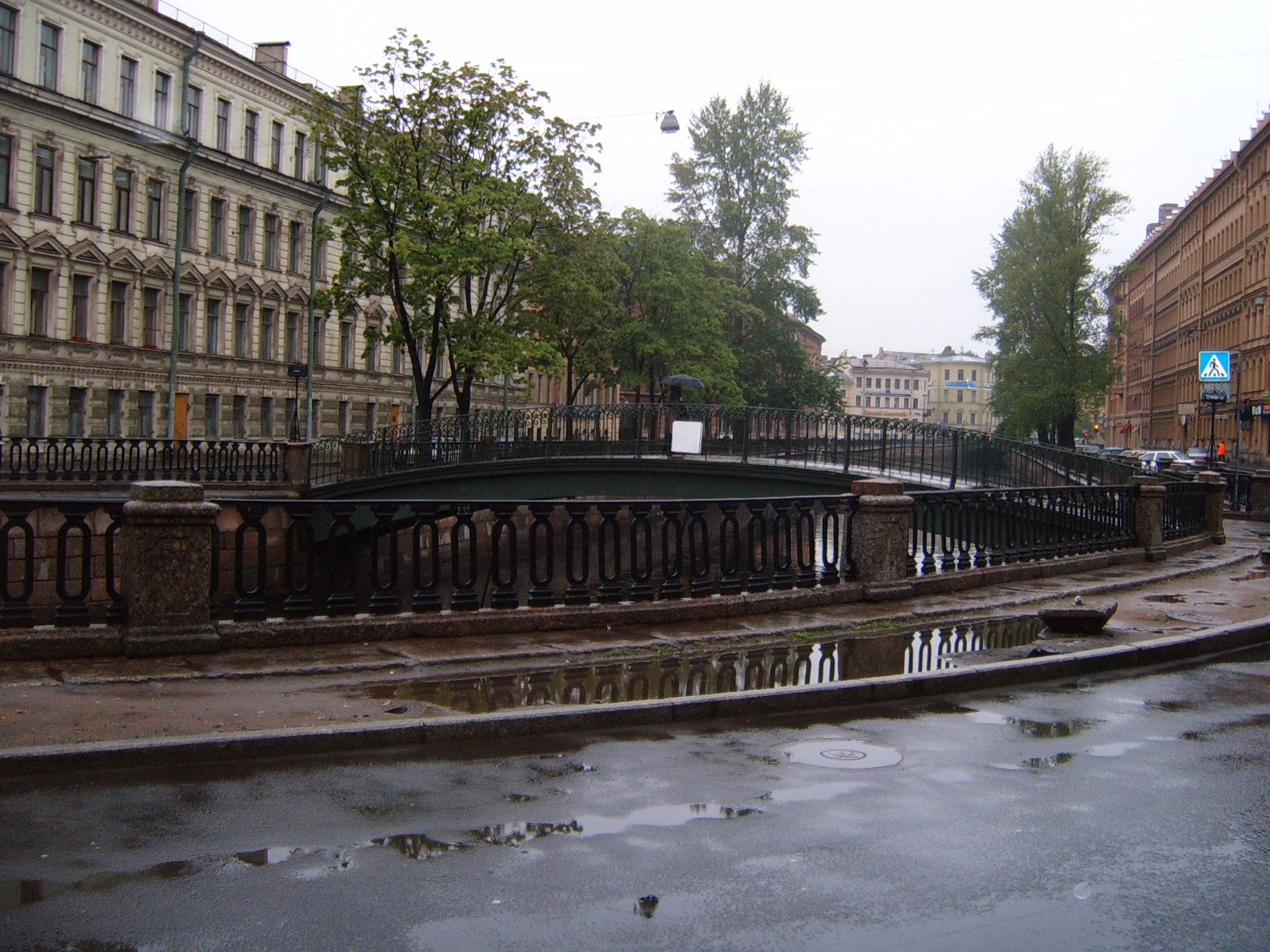

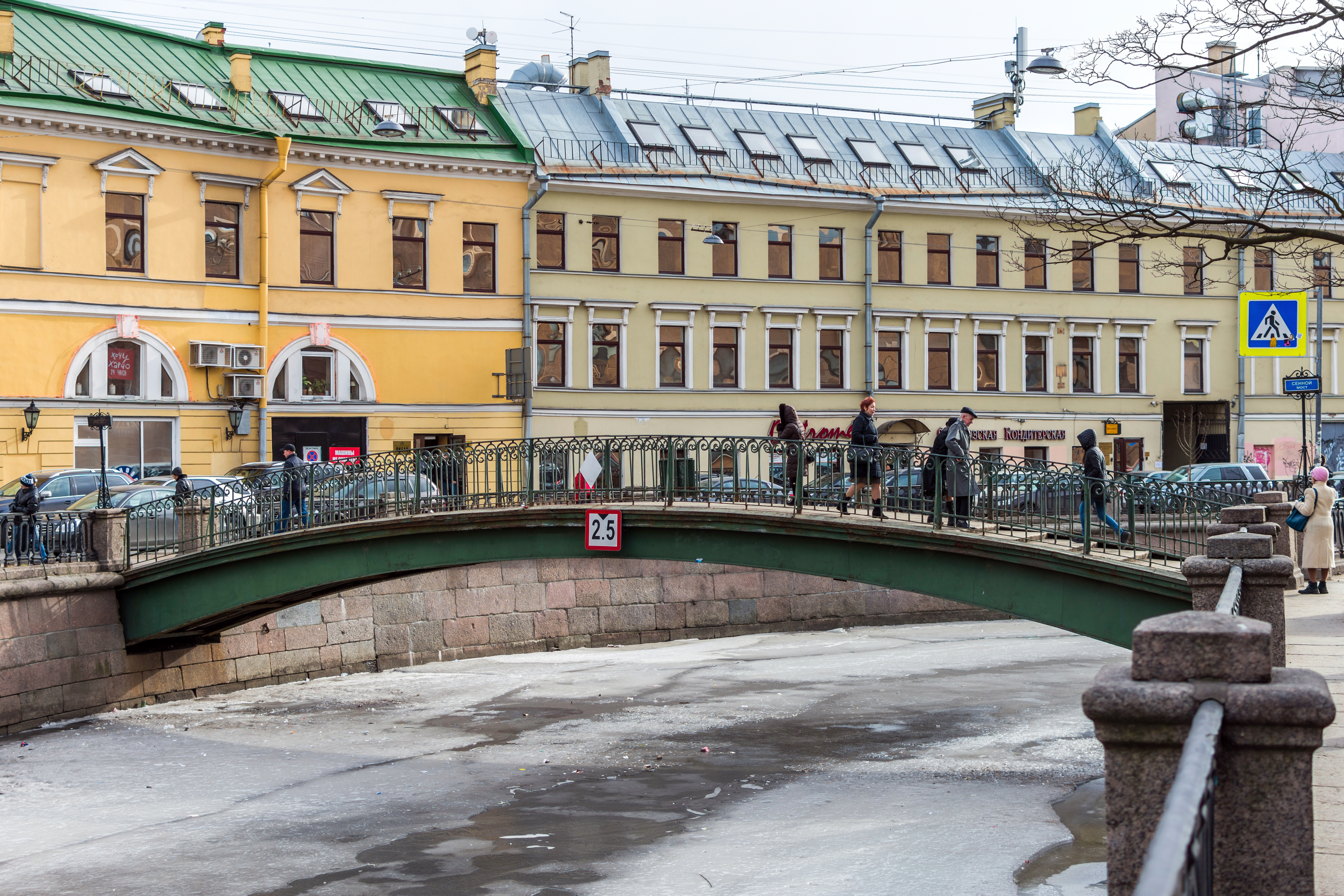
