= Flour Bridge =

Bridge in Saint Petersburg, Russia

Flour Bridge Мучной мост
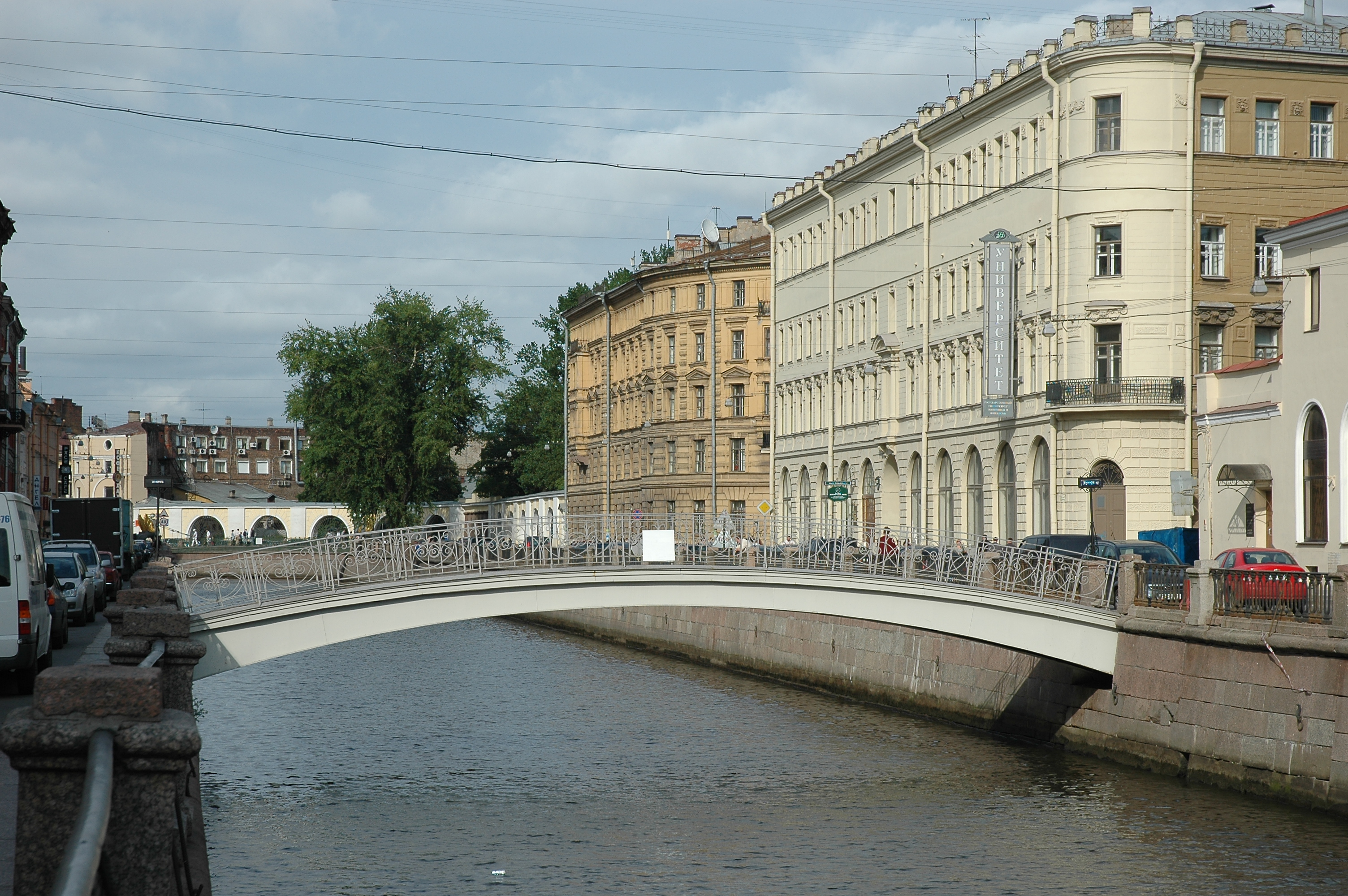
- Coordinates: 59°55′52″N 30°19′16″E
- Carries: pedestrian
- Crosses: Griboyedov Canal
- Locale: Saint Petersburg

Characteristics
- Design: Arch Bridge
- Total length: 22.5 m
- Width: 2.3 м

History
- Opened: 1931 (original), 1951 (modern)

The Flour Bridge (Russian: Мучной мост) is a bridge across the Griboyedov Canal in Saint Petersburg, Russia.

The bridge got its name from the flour warehouses located nearby, which were built in the 18th century and also gave their name to the nearby Flour Alley.

The first bridge at this place was built in 1931, it had three spans and carried heating pipes. In 1951 the bridge was rebuilt according to P. V. Bazhenov's design which converted it into a single span pedestrian bridge.

The arch of the bridge is created by a curvilinear steel beam which is supported by the quay walls. Gently sloping stairways descend at the ends of the bridge.

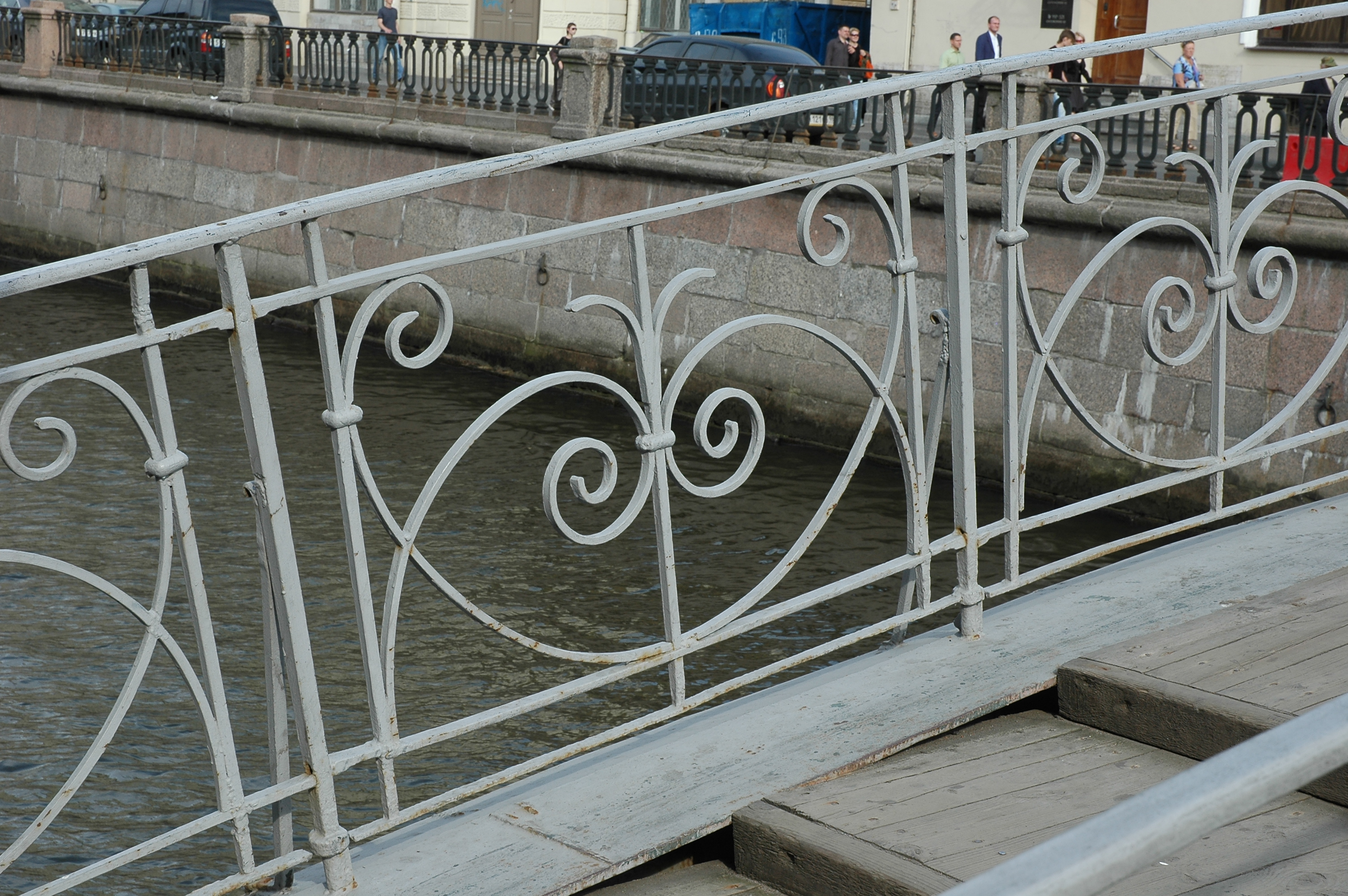
Close-up of the railings and stairways
