= Stone Bridge (Saint Petersburg) =

Stone Bridge Каменный Мост
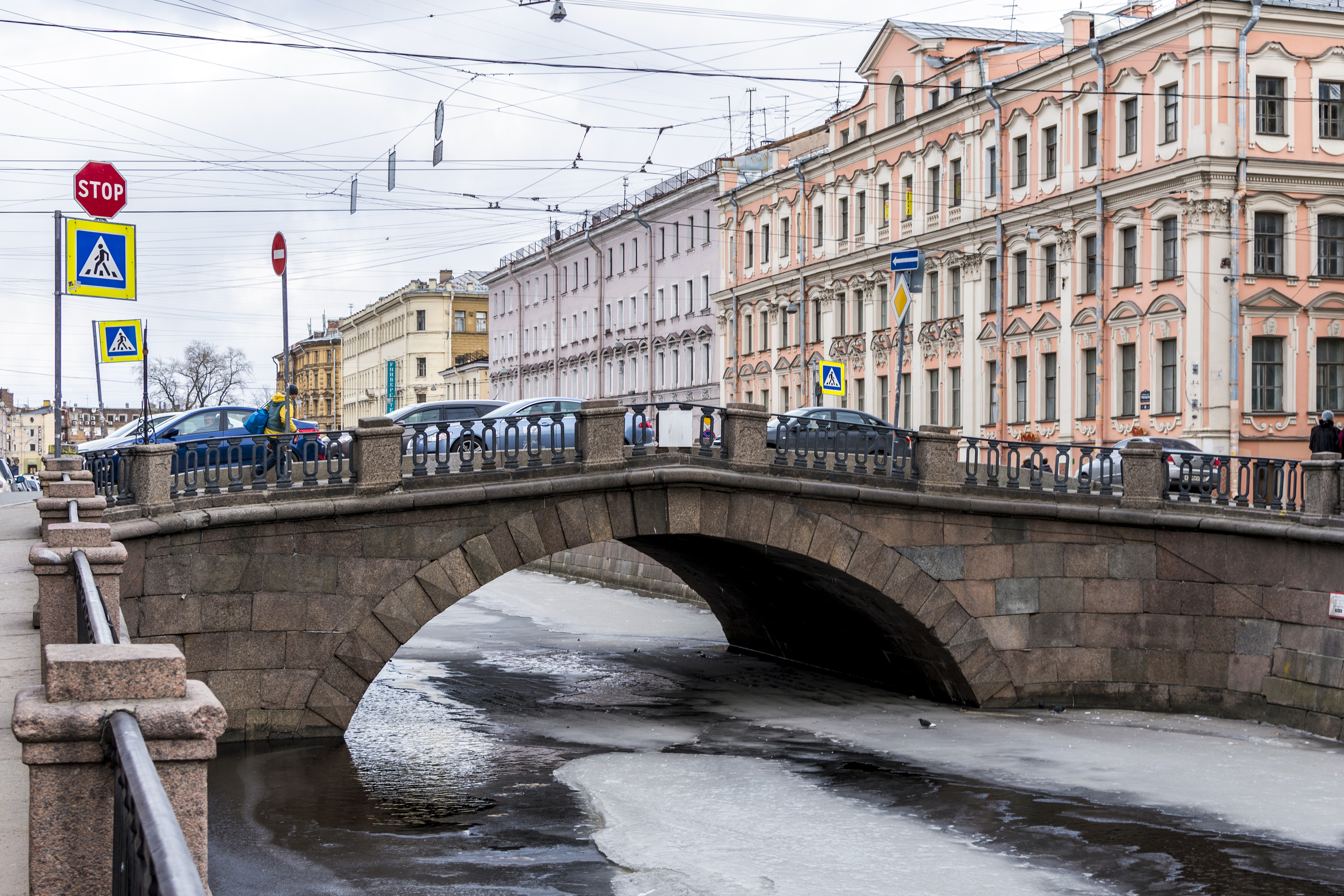
- Coordinates: 59°55′50″N 30°19′09″E
- Crosses: Griboyedov Canal
- Locale: Saint Petersburg

Characteristics
- Design: Arch Bridge
- Total length: 19.7 m
- Width: 13.8

Location
- Interactive map of Stone Bridge; Каменный Мост

The Stone Bridge (Russian: Каменный мост) is a bridge across the Griboyedov Canal in Saint Petersburg, Russia. It was built in 1774–78, and at the time it was one of the first bridges in Saint Petersburg made of stone, hence the name. The bridge crosses the canal on the axis of Gorokhovaya Street connecting Kazansky and Spassky islands. Unlike many other bridges, this one did not undergo major reconstruction, and therefore preserves most of its original form from the 18th century.

== History and architecture ==
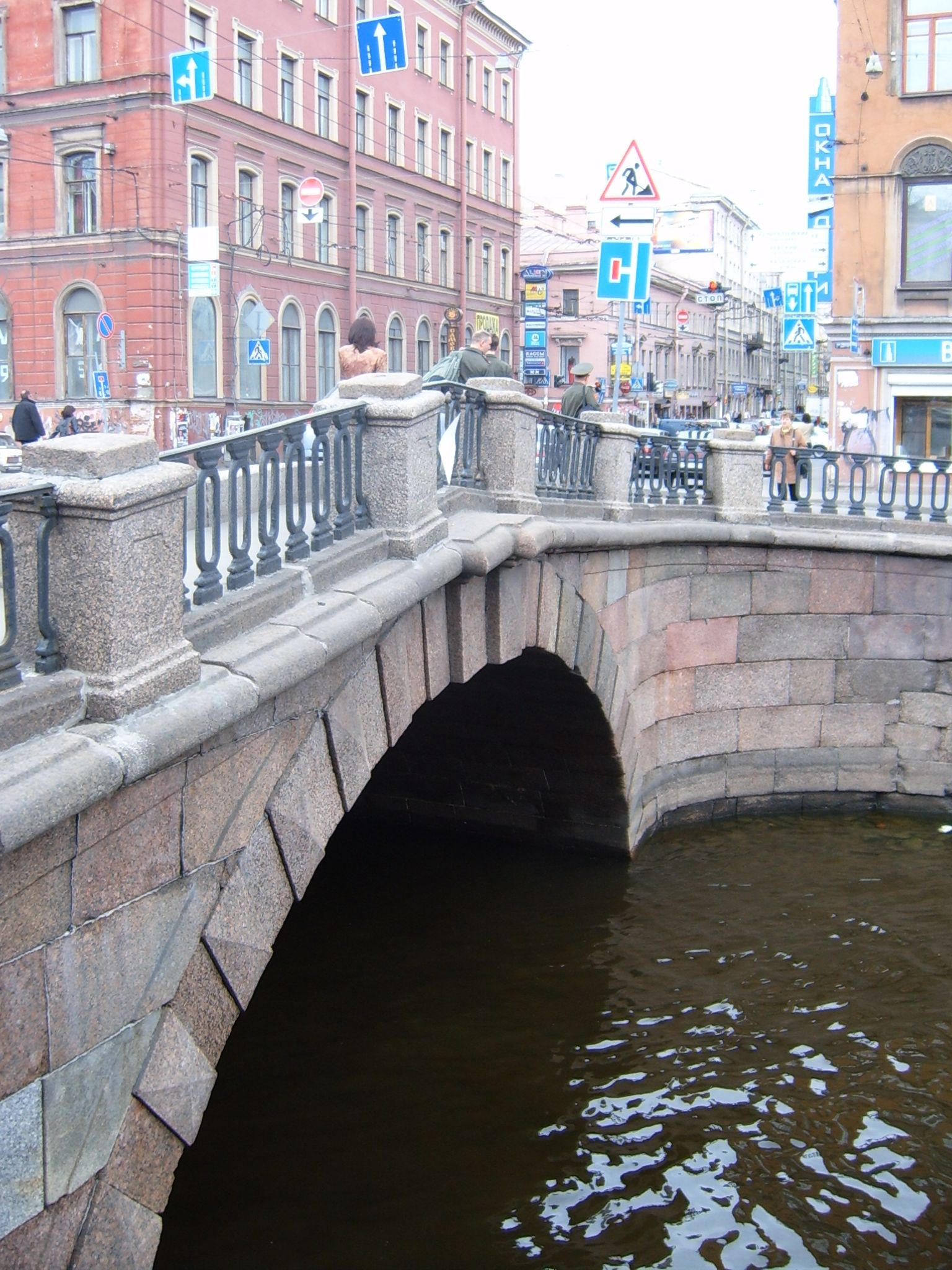

The modern Stone Bridge was constructed in the period of 1774–78. Engineer V.I.Nazimov designed the project and engineer I.N.Borisov supervised the construction. The bridge replaced an older wooden Middle bridge which had existed at the same location since 1752. Prior to that time the bridges were wooden, and this was one of the first bridges built out of stone in St. Petersburg. The arch of the bridge is composed of granite. The facade features flat granite blocks which alternate with four face pyramid shaped blocks (see picture on the left). Initially, the bridge featured four curved stairs descending to the water, but they were removed at the end of 19th century. Except for that detail, the bridge remained unchanged through the centuries. The pattern of railings repeats that of the embankment.

The arch of the bridge is moderately steep. The first buses that appeared in Saint Petersburg had problems entering the bridge. When the bus was full, the driver would ask passengers to leave the bus at the entrance to the bridge, and cross the bridge on foot, while the empty bus would go over it.

== Bridge and revolution events ==
In the summer of 1880, the members of the Narodnaya Volya organization planted dynamite under the bridge with the intent to detonate it when the carriage carrying emperor Alexander II would be crossing the bridge. However, this operation was never realized, since the conspirators were not sure that seven poods (approximately 115 kilograms) of dynamite would be enough to bring down the bridge. The hidden dynamite was extracted from the bottom of the canal in spring of 1881, after Alexander's assassination, during the Trial of the Fourteen.
