= Bridge of Four Lions =

Pedestrian bridge in Saint Petersburg, Russia

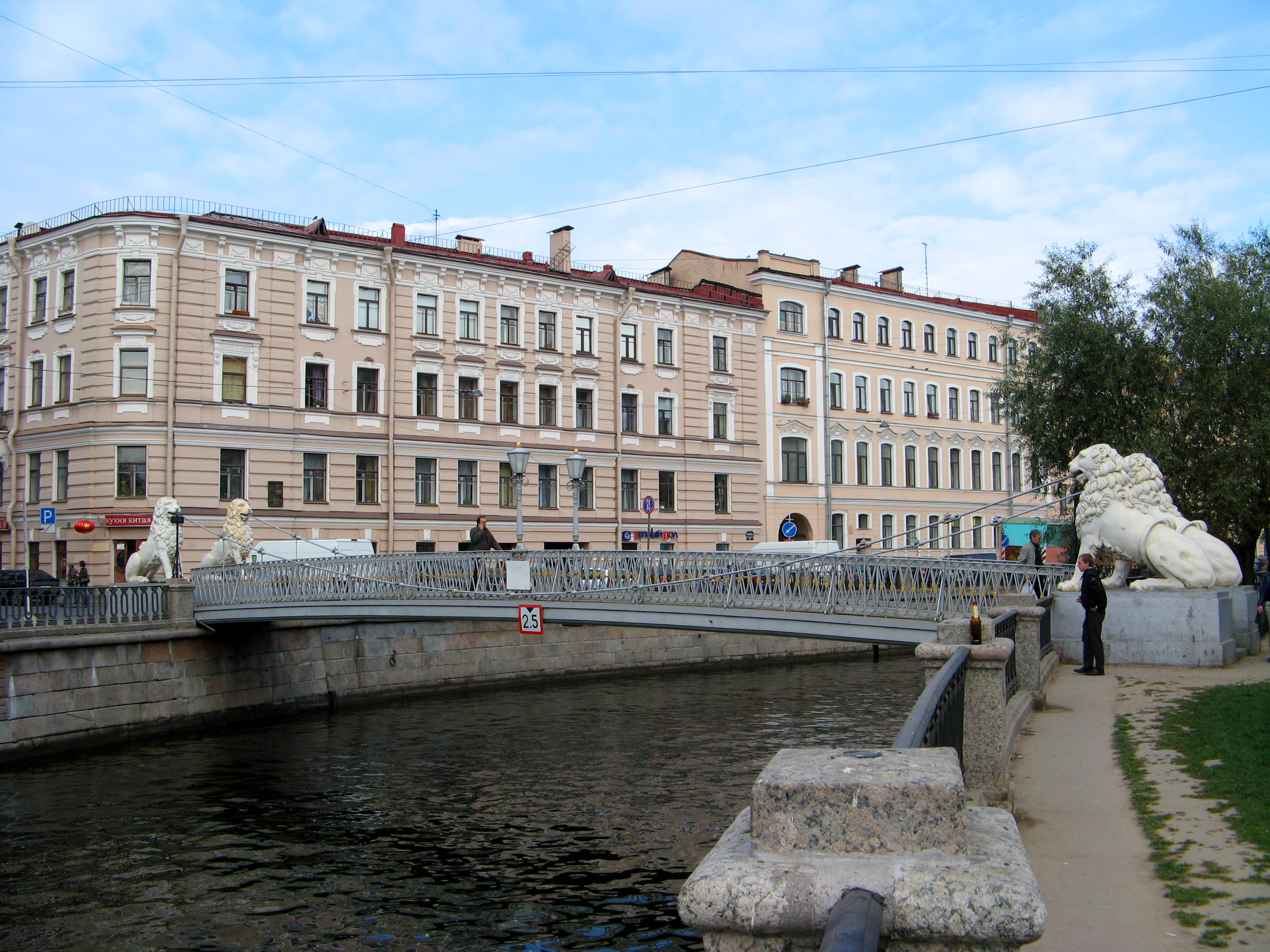
- Coordinates: 59°55′37″N 30°18′05″E
- Crosses: Griboyedov Canal
- Locale: Admiralteysky District, Saint Petersburg

Characteristics
- Design: Suspension
- Total length: 22.44 (27.8) m
- Width: 2.2 m
- Traversable?: Pedestrian

History
- Opening: 1 July 1826
- Closed: 1948, 2000

Location
- Interactive map of Bridge of Four Lions

Bridge of Four Lions (Russian: Львиный мост, Мост о четырёх львах) is a 28-metre-long pedestrian bridge over the Griboyedov Canal in Saint Petersburg, connecting Lviny Lane to Malaya Podyacheskaya Street. The Lion Bridge is in the Admiralteysky District of Saint Petersburg, connecting the Kazansky and Spassky Islands. Its abutments are crowned with four cast iron sculptures of lions, which give the bridge its name. The structure, suspended by cables emerging from the mouths of lions, was constructed in 1825 according to the design of two well-established bridge builders, Wilhelm von Traitteur and Vasily Khristianovich. It is an outstanding monument of bridge-building architecture of the first quarter of the 19th century. It is also one of the three surviving pedestrian chain bridges in Saint Petersburg (along with the Bank and Pochtamtsky Bridges).

== Location ==
The bridge connects Lviny Lane and Malaya Podyacheskaya Street. Upstream is the Podyachsky Bridge, below the Kharlamov Bridge. The nearest metro stations (1 km) are Sadovaya, Sennaya Ploshchad, and Spasskaya.

== Name ==
The Lion Bridge is named for the four cast iron sculptures of lions by the sculptor Pavel Sokolov, located at the corners of the bridge. Until 1912, the bridge was also called the Mariinsky Bridge (after the former name of Lviny Lane) and Teatralny Pedestrian Bridge (after the nearby Teatralny Square).

== History ==
The need to build a bridge was caused by the growth of population in the area adjacent to the Catherine Canal. The bridge project was developed by the engineers Wilhelm von Traitteur and Vasily Khristianovich. Simultaneously with the Lion Bridge, a project was drawn up for a second chain pedestrian bridge across the canal, later called the Bank Bridge. On 18 February 1825, both projects were approved, and the construction of the bridge began in the summer of the same year. It was supposed to be completed by October of the same year, but due to a delay in the manufacture of metal parts of the bridge, assembly of the bridge began in the spring of 1826. To construct the bridge supports, the embankment backfill was dismantled (without dismantling the granite cladding). The manufacture of cast iron and metal parts, as well as the assembly of elements at the construction site, was carried out by the Bard plant. On 1 July 1826, the bridge was opened for traffic.

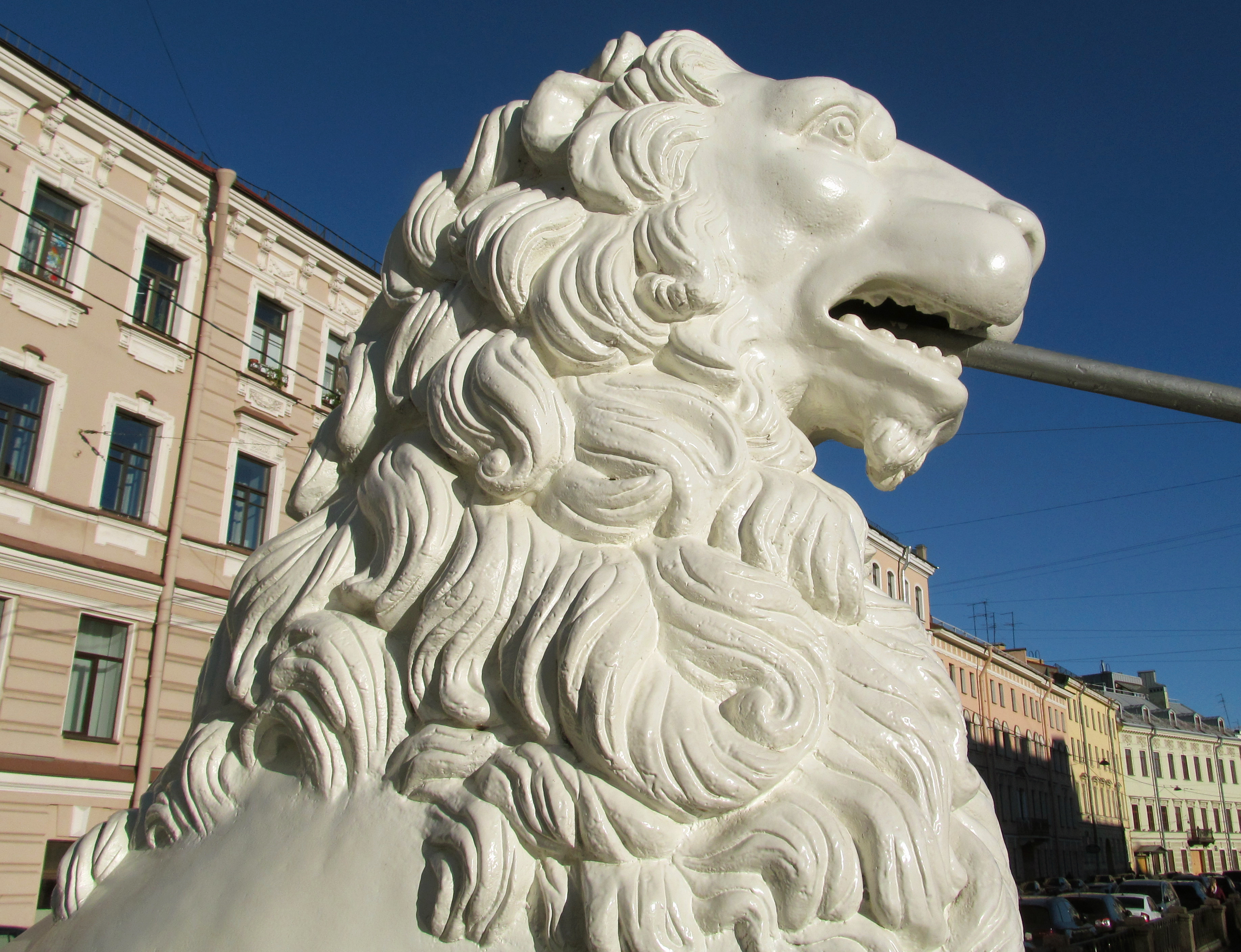
detail of the lion sculptures

The sculptures of lions were made by academician Pavel Sokolov. Work on the creation of the models lasted from May to September 1825, and the sculptor also made alabaster molds. The sculpture was supposed to be minted from copper sheets, but then the figures were cast from cast iron at the Alexandrovsky iron foundry. The sculptures of lions were painted with a matte white paint to resemble marble

In 1882, all the wooden parts of the bridge were replaced, the cast iron railings were replaced with iron forged ones of a very primitive design, the lanterns located in the middle of the bridge were dismantled. The right-bank embankment of the canal was raised by one row of granite stones, while the figures of lions with pedestals and chains were raised.

In 1948, overseen by engineer A. M. Yanovskiy, a major reconstruction of the bridge was carried out including the replacement of wooden longitudinal beams with metal I-beams. In 1954, a new handrail and lanterns were installed on the bridge, made according to the original project, the white color of the lion sculptures was restored (after a series of unsuccessful dark paints). Restoration work on the reconstruction of the bridge rails, floor lamps with lanterns and the restoration of the original painting were carried out by the Special Scientific Restoration Production Workshops of the Office of Architecture, designed by the architect Aleksandr Rotach and the technician G. F. Perlina.

In 1999-2000, according to the project of JSC Institute "Stroyproekt," the bridge was overhauled: the beams of the superstructure were replaced, the sculptures of lions were restored. In 2018, work was carried out for the restoration of the lion sculptures.

== Copy of the bridge ==
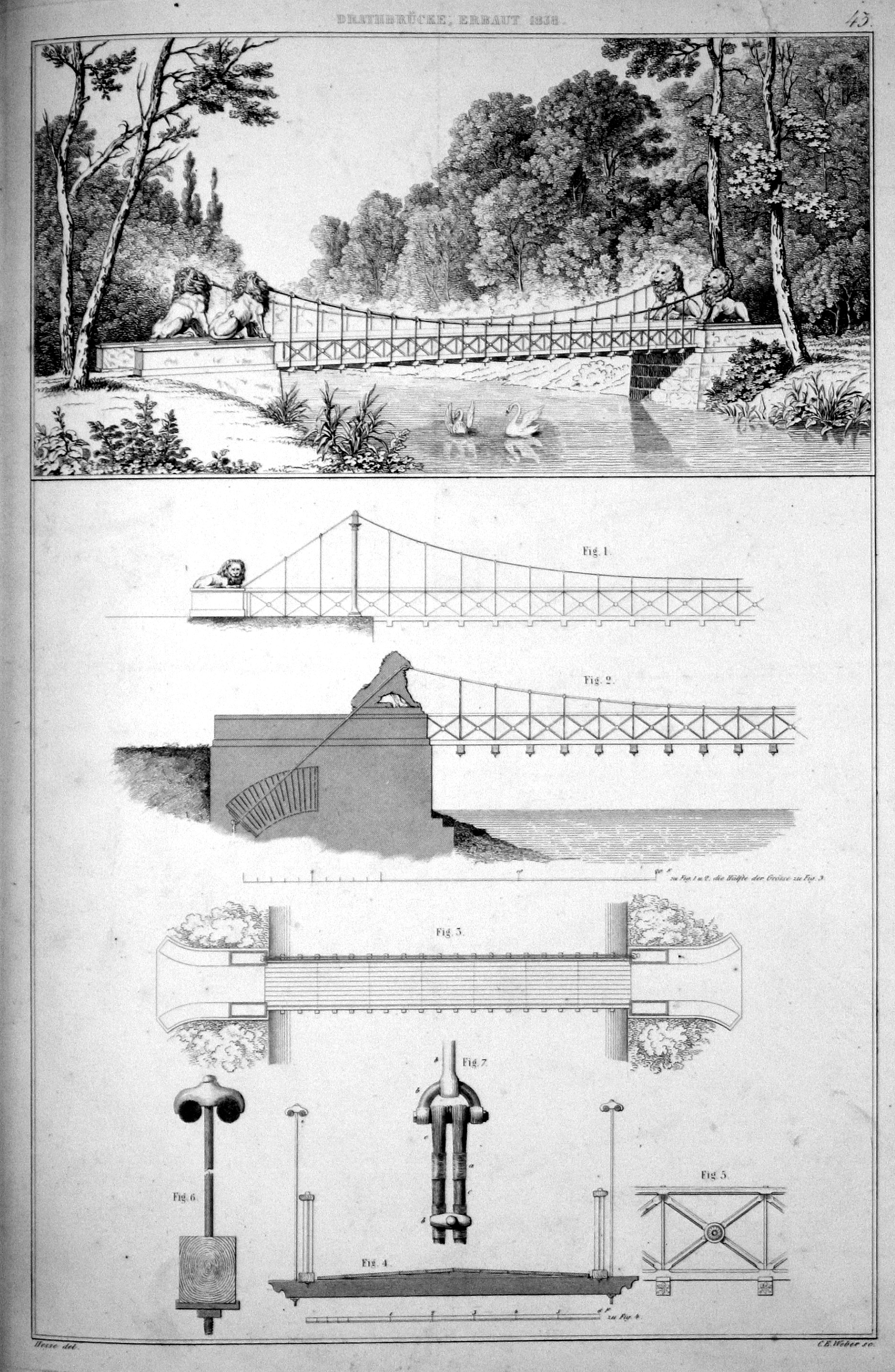
Drawing of the "Loewenbrücke" bridge by Ludwig Hesse

In 1838, a reduced copy of the bridge (length 17.3 m, width 2 m) was erected by the firm Borsig to the design of German architect Ludwig Hesse in Berlin's Tiergarten.

The German Löwenbrücke was the first suspension bridge in Berlin. Unlike the original in Saint Petersburg, the superstructure and railings of the Berlin Lion Bridge are still wooden.

== Design ==
The bridge is a single-span beam, the chains play a decorative role. The superstructure consists of two welded double-tee beams made of low-alloy steel, combined with a chain hanging system with a distribution strip.

The function of the pylons is performed by the sculptured cast iron frames (frames), attached with anchor bolts through the masonry to a wooden grille, compressed from above and below by massive cast iron slabs, to which supporting chains are attached. A monolithic reinforced concrete slab was built under the pylons within the boundaries of the cast iron pedestals of the sculptures. The chains are made up of round metal links.

At the entrances to the bridge, sculptures of lions are installed on cast iron pedestals. The railing is of artistic casting, and the design is a grid of a continuous rows of crossed rectangular rods, the ends of which at the top and bottom are connected by semicircular arcs of the same cross-section in the form of stylized eights, forming places for semicircular bronze rosettes. A similar perimeter design was used for several Saint Petersburg bridges (for example, the Ioannovsky Bridge). In the middle of the bridge, two multifaceted lanterns on cast iron posts rich in molding are mounted in the railings. Some parts of the bridge (balls and rosettes of the fence, shaped parts of lanterns, etc.) are gilded.

The width of the bridge between the railings is 2.28 m, the length of the bridge is 22.44 (27.8) m, the distance between the axes of the chains is 2.42 m. The surface for the walkway of the bridge is wood.

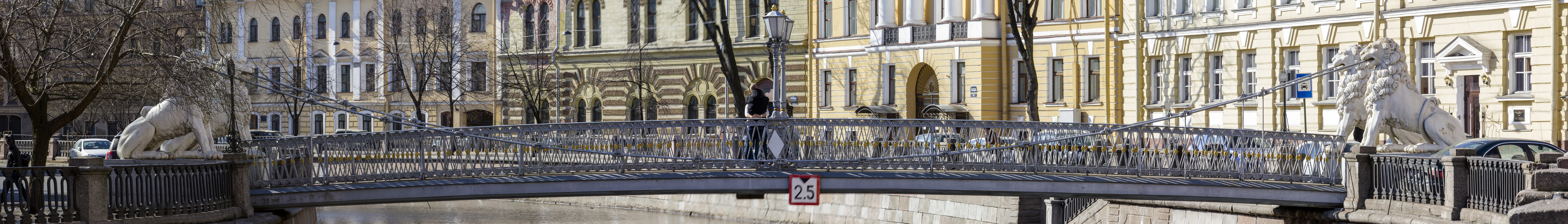
