= Novo-Konyushenny Bridge =

Bridge in Saint Petersburg, Russia

Novo-Konyushenny Bridge Ново-Конюшенный мост
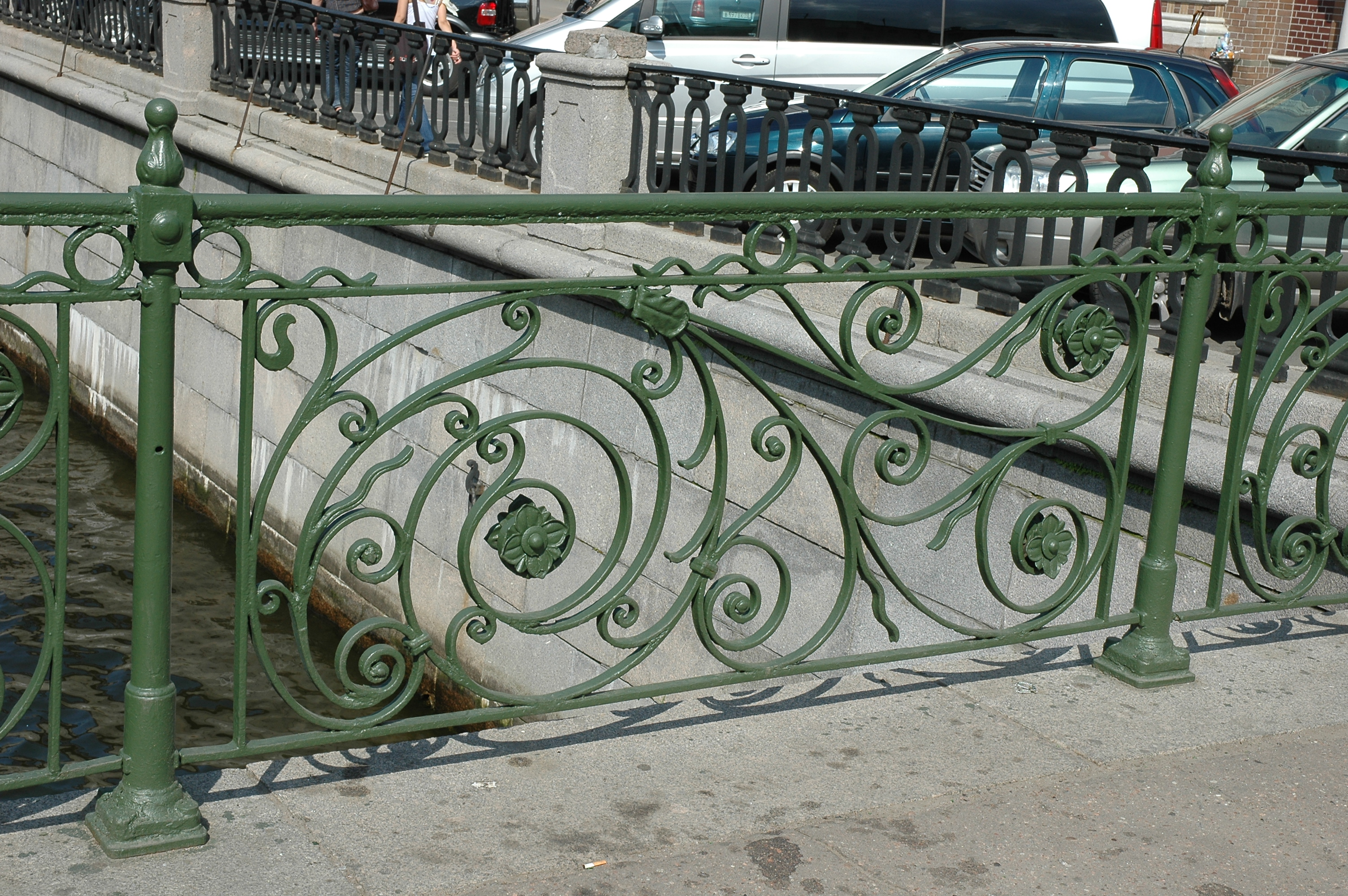
- Fragment of railings
- Coordinates: 59°56′27″N 30°19′42″E
- Crosses: Griboedov Canal
- Locale: Saint Petersburg

History
- Opened: 1880s (wooden), 1967

The Novo-Konyushenny Bridge (Russian: Ново-Конюшенный мост, literally New Stables Bridge) is a bridge across the Griboedov Canal in Saint Petersburg, Russia. It acts as an extension of the Stable Square.

== History ==
The first wooden bridge was built here in the 1880s to assist the construction of the Church of the Savior on Blood. During construction, the width of the bridge reached 115 meters (for comparison, the widest bridge in Saint Petersburg today, the Blue Bridge is 97.5 meters wide). When the cathedral was completed in 1907, the bridge remained in place and was named Church of the Resurrection of Christ Bridge. After the October Revolution in 1917, it was renamed to bridge-overlap. In 1975, the new ferroconcrete bridge was built, and it was named Grinevsky Bridge, after Ignacy Hryniewiecki - the assassin of Tsar Alexander II of Russia, who threw the bomb into tzar's cart near the location of the modern bridge. In 1998 the bridge was renamed once again to its current name after the nearby Stable Square (Konyushennaya Square).
