= Kazansky Bridge =

Bridge in Saint Petersburg, Russia

Coordinates: 59.9353°N 30.3262°E

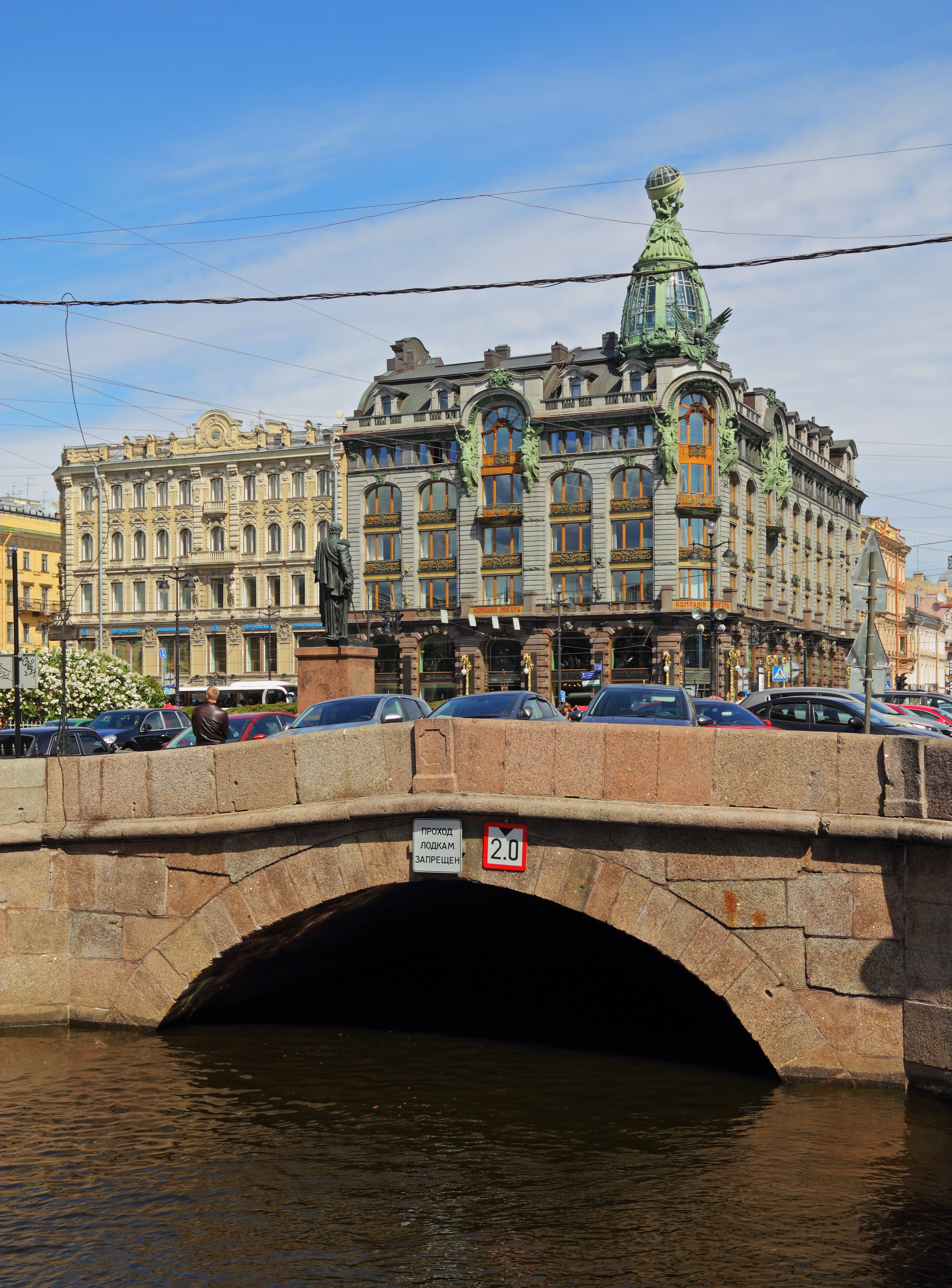
Kazan Bridge, and Singer House in the background

Kazansky Bridge (Russian: Каза́нский мост) is a bridge across Griboyedov Canal in Saint Petersburg, Russia. From 1766 to 1830, it had the name Rozhdestvensky Bridge (Рождественский мост) and from 1923 to 1944—Plekhanov Bridge (мост Плеханова). It is located near the Kazan Cathedral (hence the name). The bridge's length is 18.8 metres (62 ft), and the width is 95.5 metres (313 ft). It is second-widest bridge in St. Petersburg after the Blue Bridge, the lowest bridge in the city and therefore also the only bridge where sailing underneath it is prohibited.

The bridge was built in 1765–1766 (259 years ago) in place of previously existed wooden Rozhdenstvensky Bridge (since 1716) which was demolished during granite embankment of Griboyedov Canal.
