= Griboyedov Canal =

Canal in St. Petersburg, Russia

Coordinates: 59.9327°N 30.3251°E

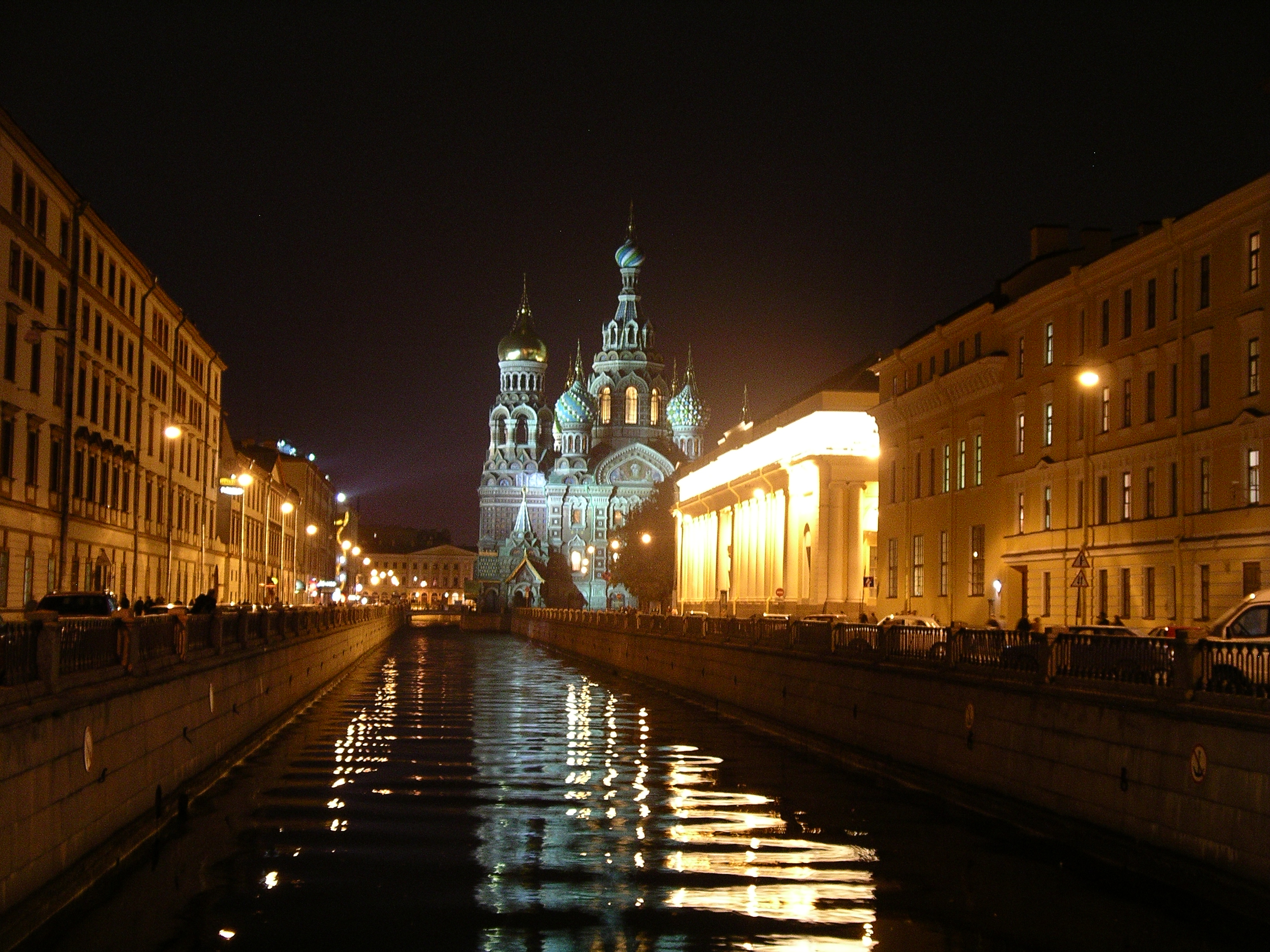
- In Backdrop of Griboyedov Canal, the Church of the Savior on Blood, St. Petersburg.
- Interactive map of Griboyedov Canal

Specifications
- Length: 3 miles (4.8 km)
- Status: open

History
- Former names: Catherine Canal
- Date of act: 1739
- Date completed: 1745

Geography
- Start point: Moyka River near the Field of Mars
- End point: Fontanka River

The Griboyedov Canal or Kanal Griboyedova (Russian: кана́л Грибое́дова) is a canal in Saint Petersburg, constructed in 1739 along the existing Krivusha river. In 1764–90, the canal was deepened and the banks were reinforced and covered with granite.

The Griboyedov Canal starts from the Moyka River near the Field of Mars. It flows into the Fontanka River. Its length is 5 kilometres (3 mi), with a width of 32 metres (105 ft).

Before 1923, it was called the Catherine Canal, after the Empress Catherine the Great, during whose rule it was deepened. The Communist authorities renamed it after the Russian playwright and diplomat, Alexandr Griboyedov.

The streets or embankments running along the canal are known as Naberezhnaya Kanala Griboyedova.

== Bridges ==
There are 21 bridges across the canal:

- Tripartite Bridge
- Novo-Konyushenny Bridge
- Italian Bridge
- Kazansky Bridge
- Bank Bridge
- Flour Bridge
- Stone Bridge
- Demidov Bridge
- Hay Bridge
- Kokushkin Bridge
- Voznesensky Bridge
- Podyachesky Bridge
- Bridge of Four Lions
- Kharlamov Bridge
- Novo-Nikolsky Bridge
- Krasnogvardeysky Bridge
- Pikalov Bridge
- Mogilyovsky Bridge
- Alarchin Bridge
- Kolomensky Bridge
- Malo-Kalinkin Bridge

== Cultural references ==
Griboedov Canal appears on the cover of the 2011 contemporary classical album, Troika.

The canal is a key location in Fyodor Dostoyevsky's novel, Crime and Punishment. Like most locations in the novel, the canal is rarely identified by its proper name; in fact, on most occasions Dostoyevsky refers to it as a kanava, a word which in English is closer to the word "ditch." In a footnote to the Penguin Deluxe Classics edition of the book, translator Oliver Ready describes the canal as a "filthy and polluted place" which is nevertheless "the topographical center of the book." The novel's protagonist, Raskolnikov, repeatedly crosses over the canal, and tentatively plans on disposing of stolen property there. The apartment building where he commits his crimes, "faced the Ditch on one side and Srednyaya Podyacheskay Street on the other."

The canal is also featured in Fyodor Dostoyevsky's short story White Nights.

== Gallery ==
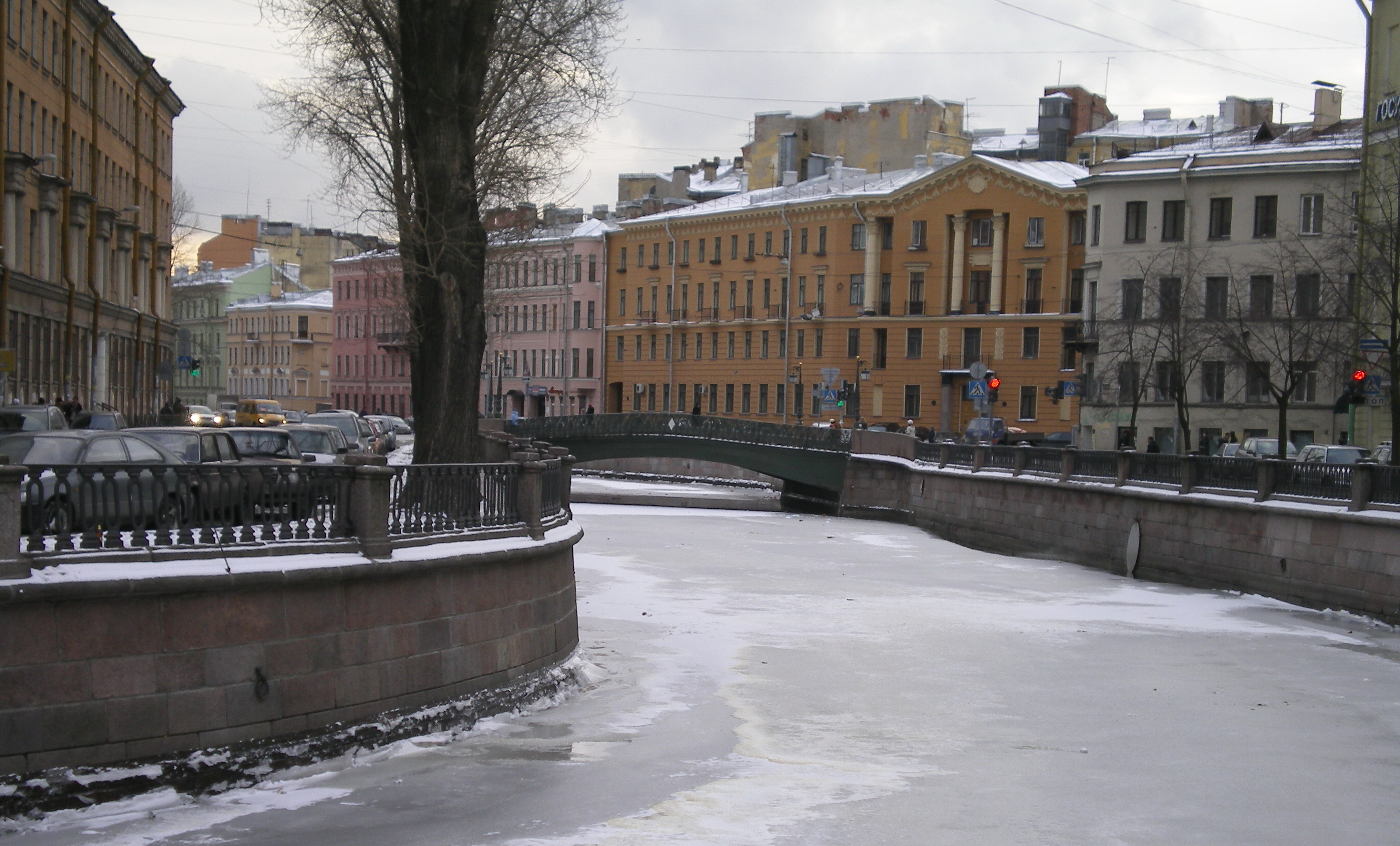
Demidov Bridge across the Griboyedov Canal, St. Petersburg

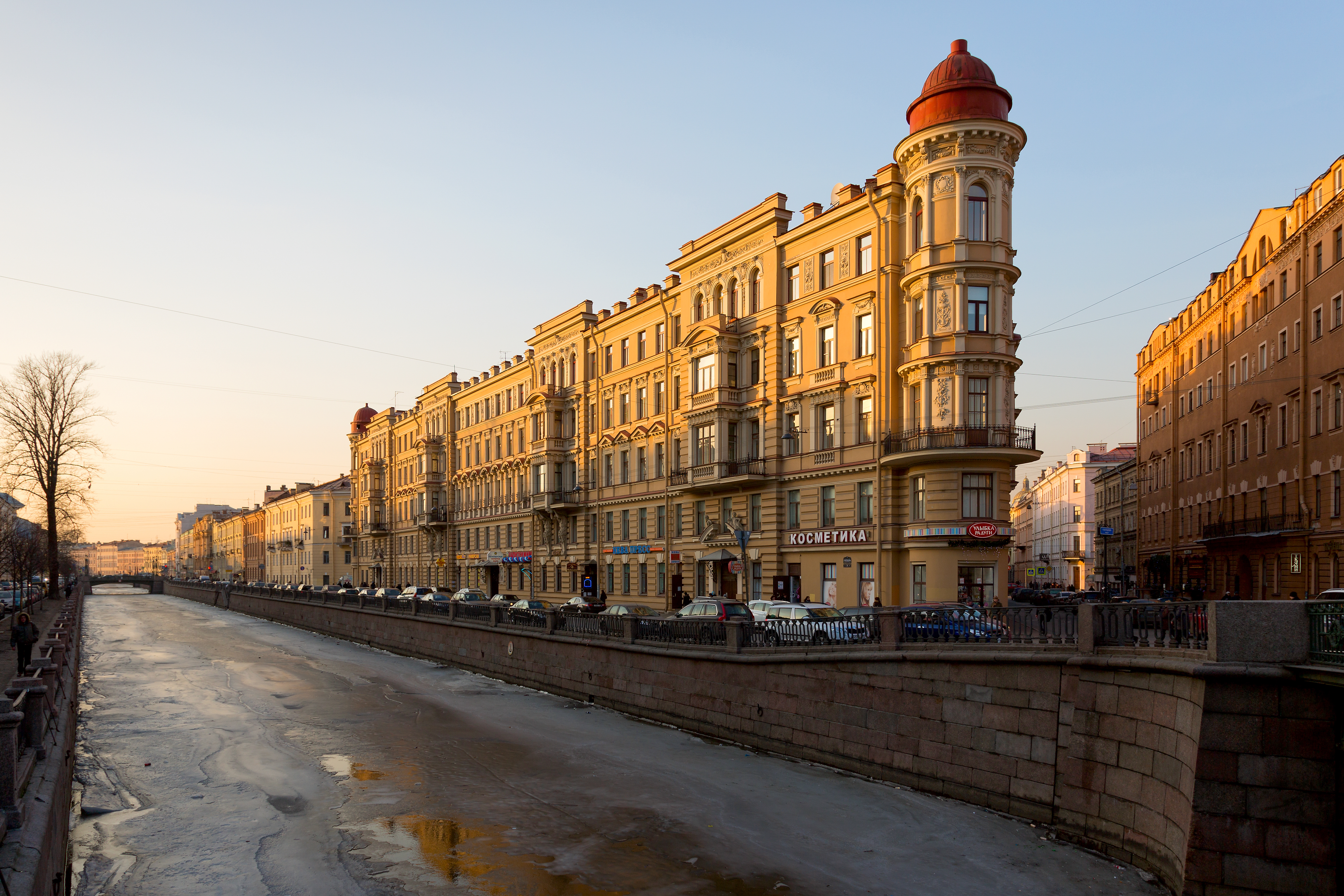
Griboyedov Canal Embankment in St. Petersburg

Griboyedov Canal Embankment in St. Petersburg. In the backdrop, Church of the Savior on Blood

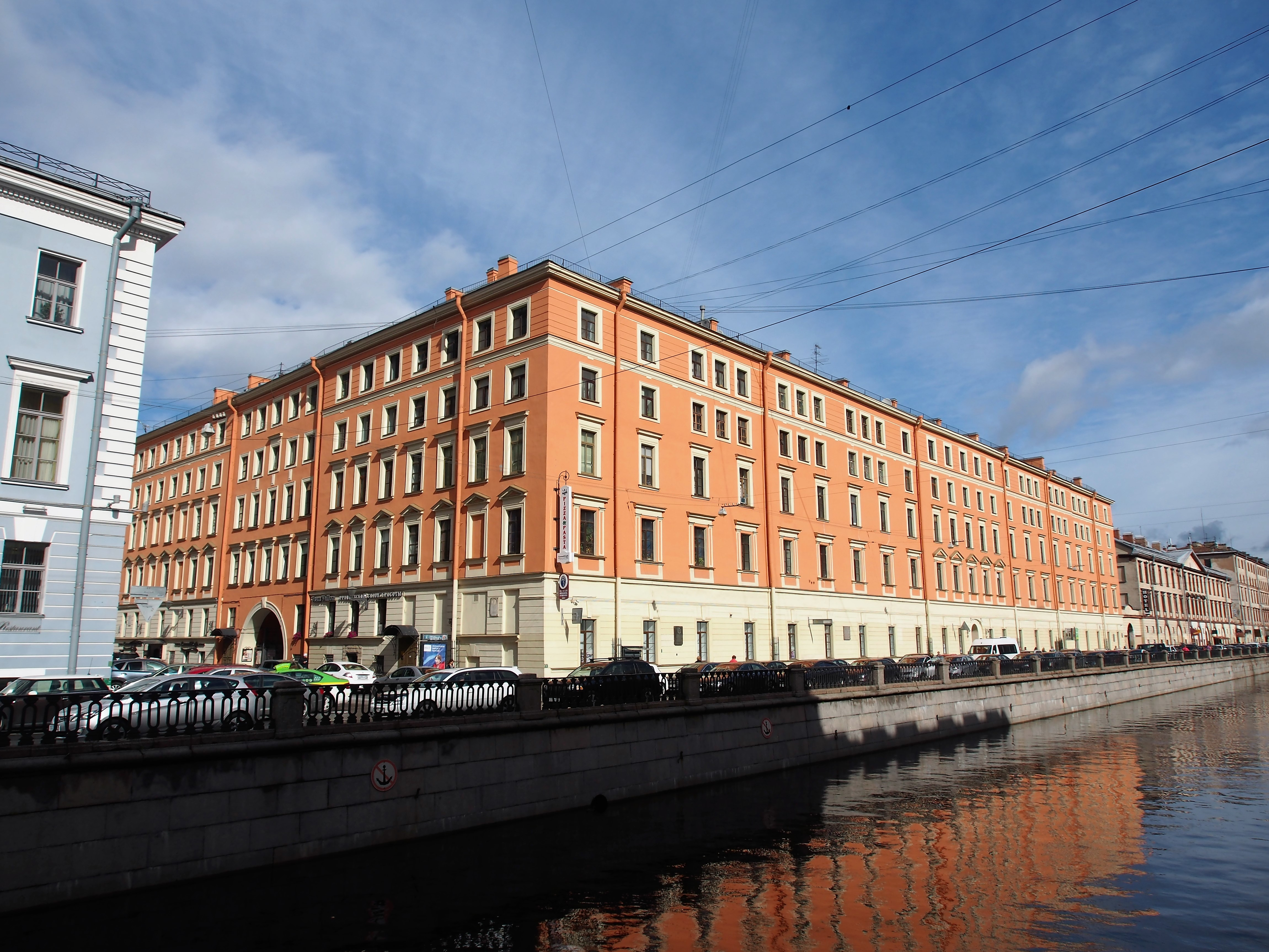
Griboyedov Canal Embankment in St. Petersburg

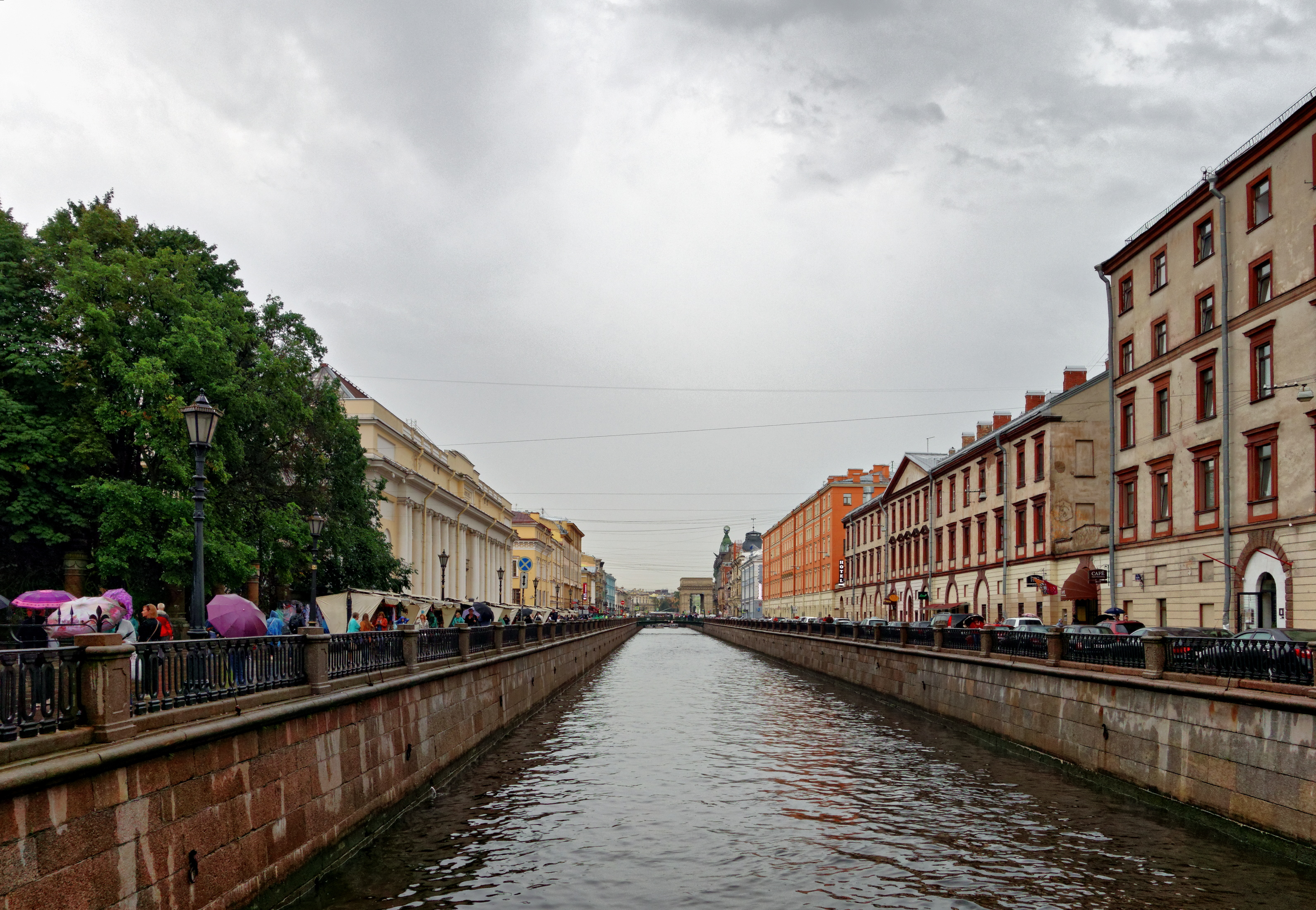
Griboyedov Canal, St. Petersburg

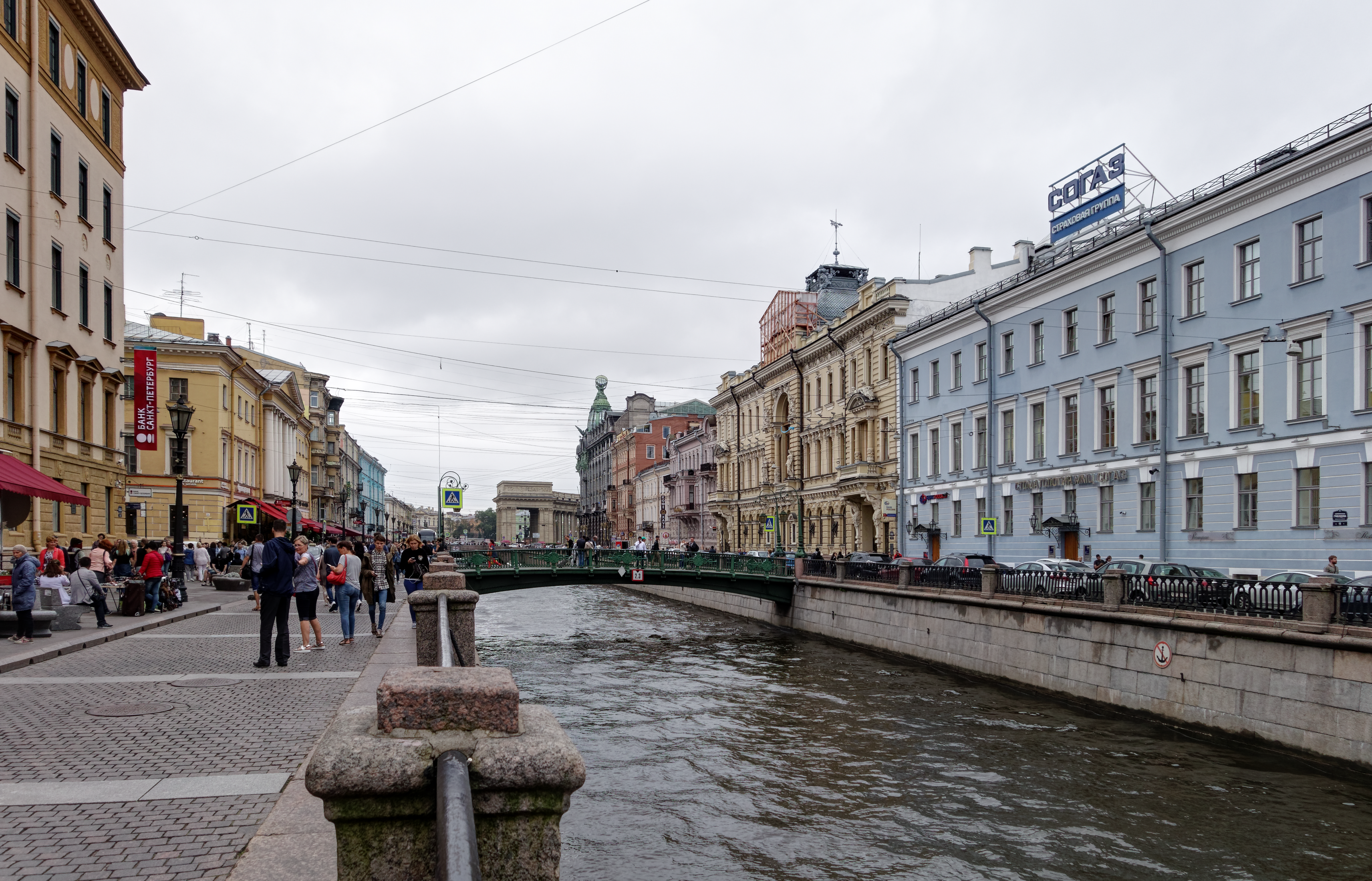
Griboyedov Canal, St. Petersburg

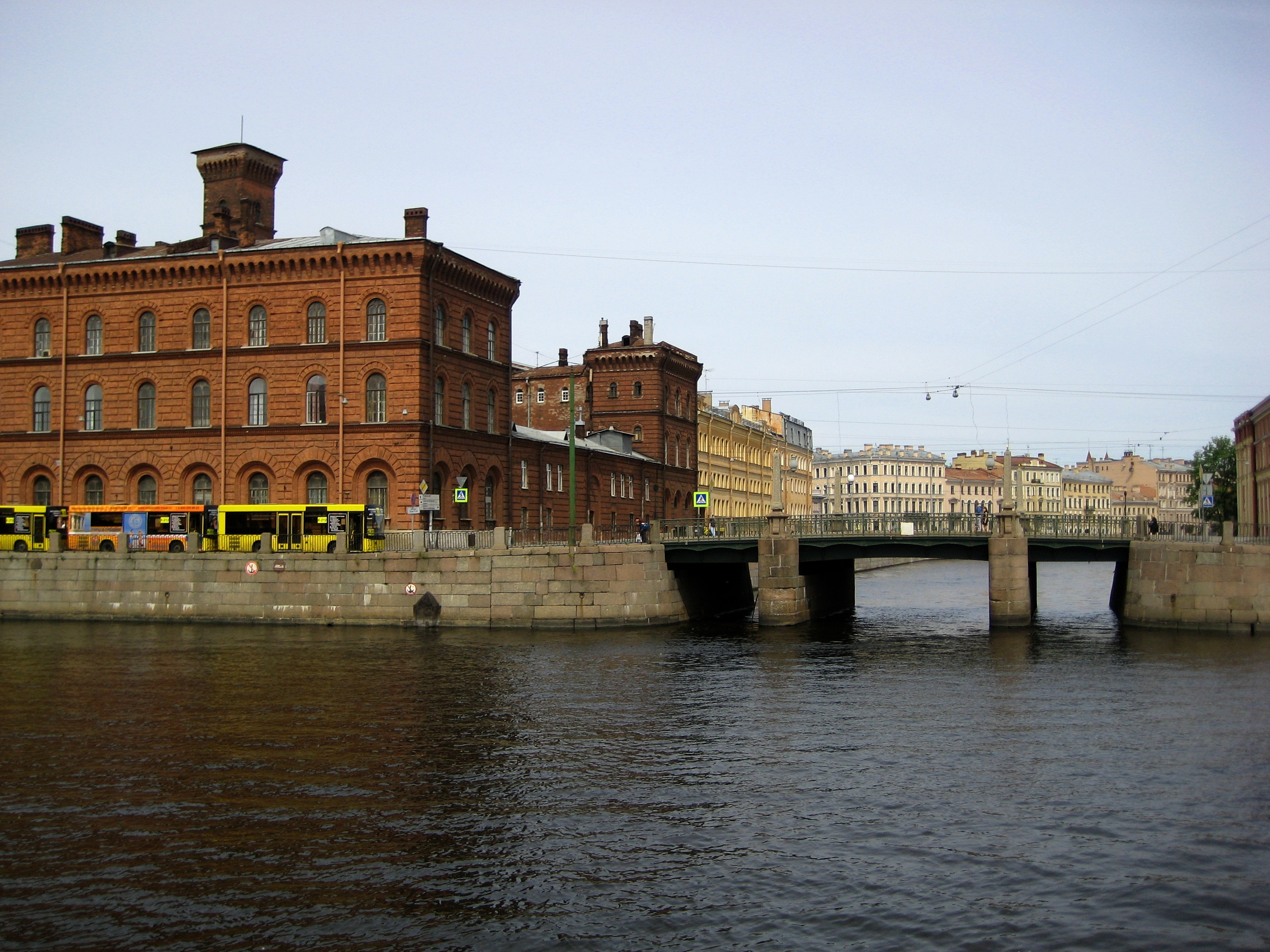
Malo-Kalinkin Bridge over the Griboyedov Canal, St. Petersburg

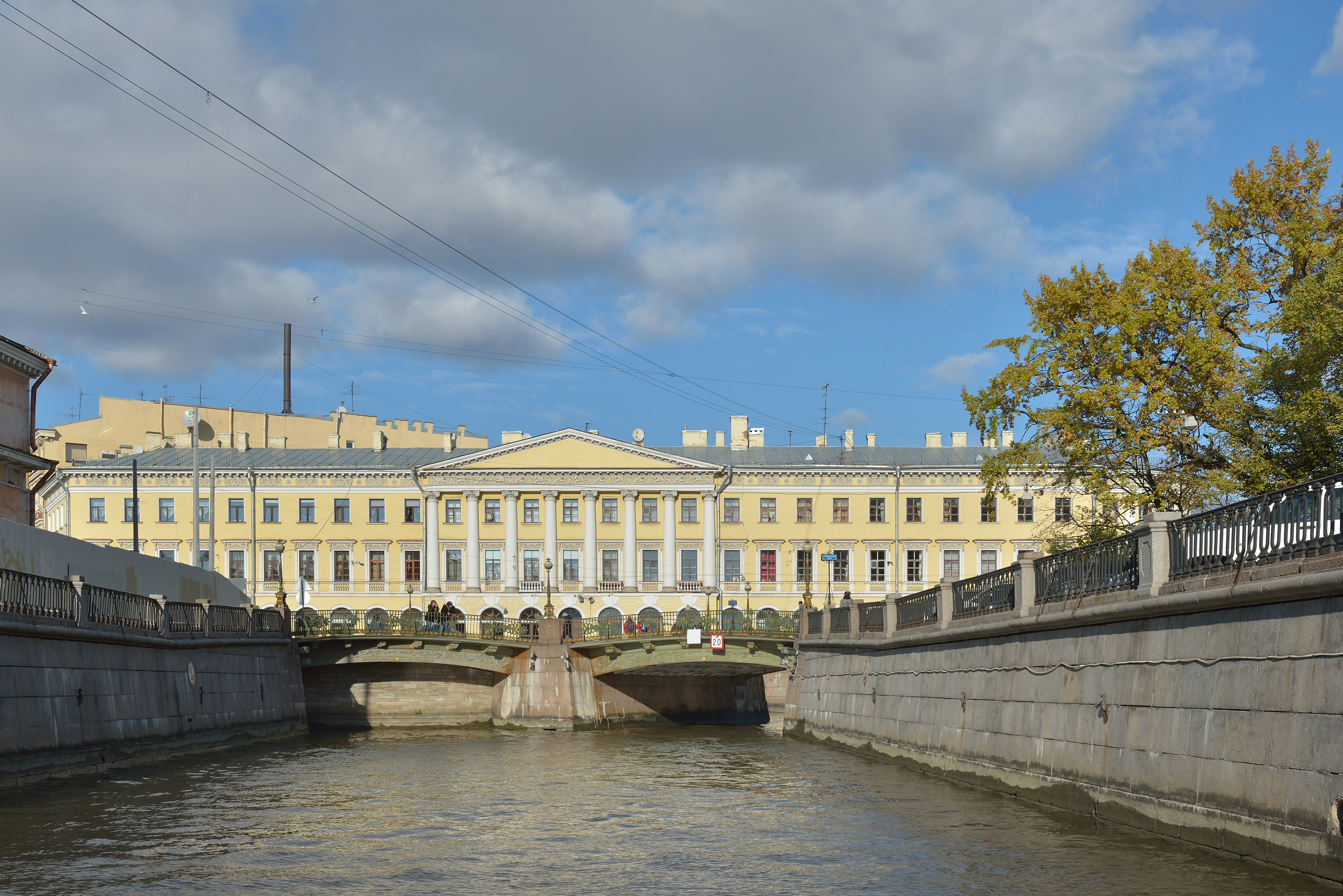
Adamini House at the junction of Moyka River and Griboyedov Canal, St. Petersburg
