= Mogilyovsky Bridge =

Bridge in Admiralteysky, Saint Petersburg, Russia

Mogilyovsky bridge
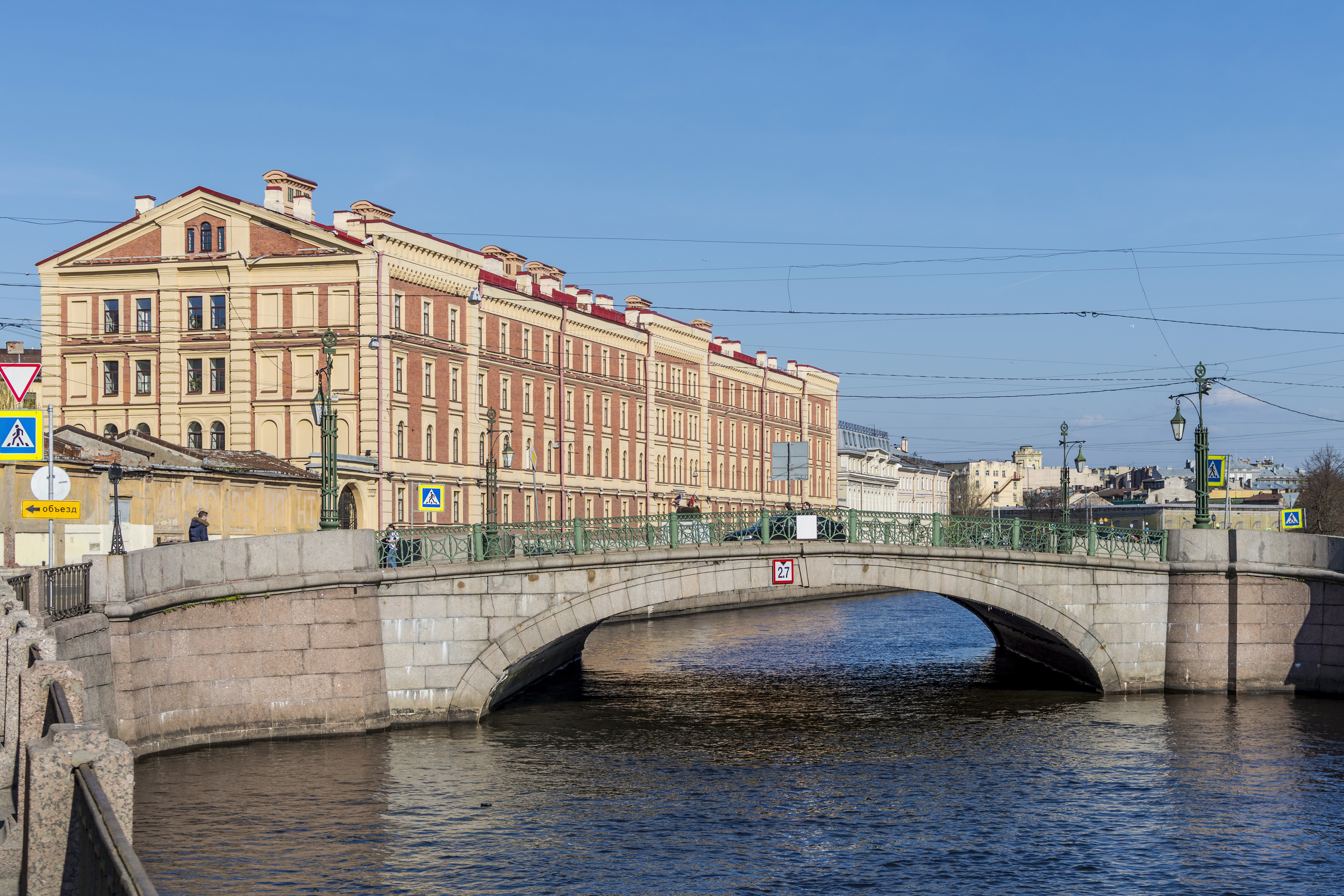
- Coordinates: 59°55′18″N 30°17′35″E
- Locale: Admiralteysky District

Characteristics
- Design: Double-Articulated Arch
- Material: Reinforced Concrete
- Total length: 28.3 m
- Width: 24 m
- No. of lanes: 4

History
- Opened: 1906
- Rebuilt: 1912, 1928; 1951 – 1953

Location
- Interactive map of Mogilyovsky bridge

Mogilyovsky Bridge is a bridge across the Griboyedov Canal to Admiralteysky District of Saint Petersburg that connects Kolomensky and Pokrovsky Islands. This bridge is located along the Lermontovsky Avenue axis. It is near the Estonian Orthodox Brotherhood St. Isidor's Church which was built in 1903—1907 by architect Alexander Poleshchuk. Upstream from Mogilyovsky Bridge is Pikalov Bridge; below is Alarchin Bridge. The closest metro station is 1.6 км away and is called Sadovaya.

== Name ==
The bridge's name has been known since 1906 and used along Mogilyovskaya Street, at the section of the current Lermontovsky Prospekt between the Ekaterininsky Canal and Fontanka. Initially, the name "Mogilev pedestrian bridge" was used, but after its reconstruction in 1912, the bridge became a transport bridge and the name "pedestrian" was dropped.

== History ==
In 1905–1906 according to engineer P.A. Likhachev's project and under his supervision, a pedestrian wooden bridge was built. In 1911—1912 the bridge was rebuilt into a transport bridge. It was a wooden pile three-span bridge of a strut-braced system, 49.6 m long and 11.5 m wide. In 1928, the bridge was expanded to 19.5 m while maintaining the previous structure. The middle span was a navigable transom-strut system. During the Siege the bridge was burned. The existing bridge was built in 1951—1953 designed by engineer V. V. Blazhevich and architect S. G. Krasikov.

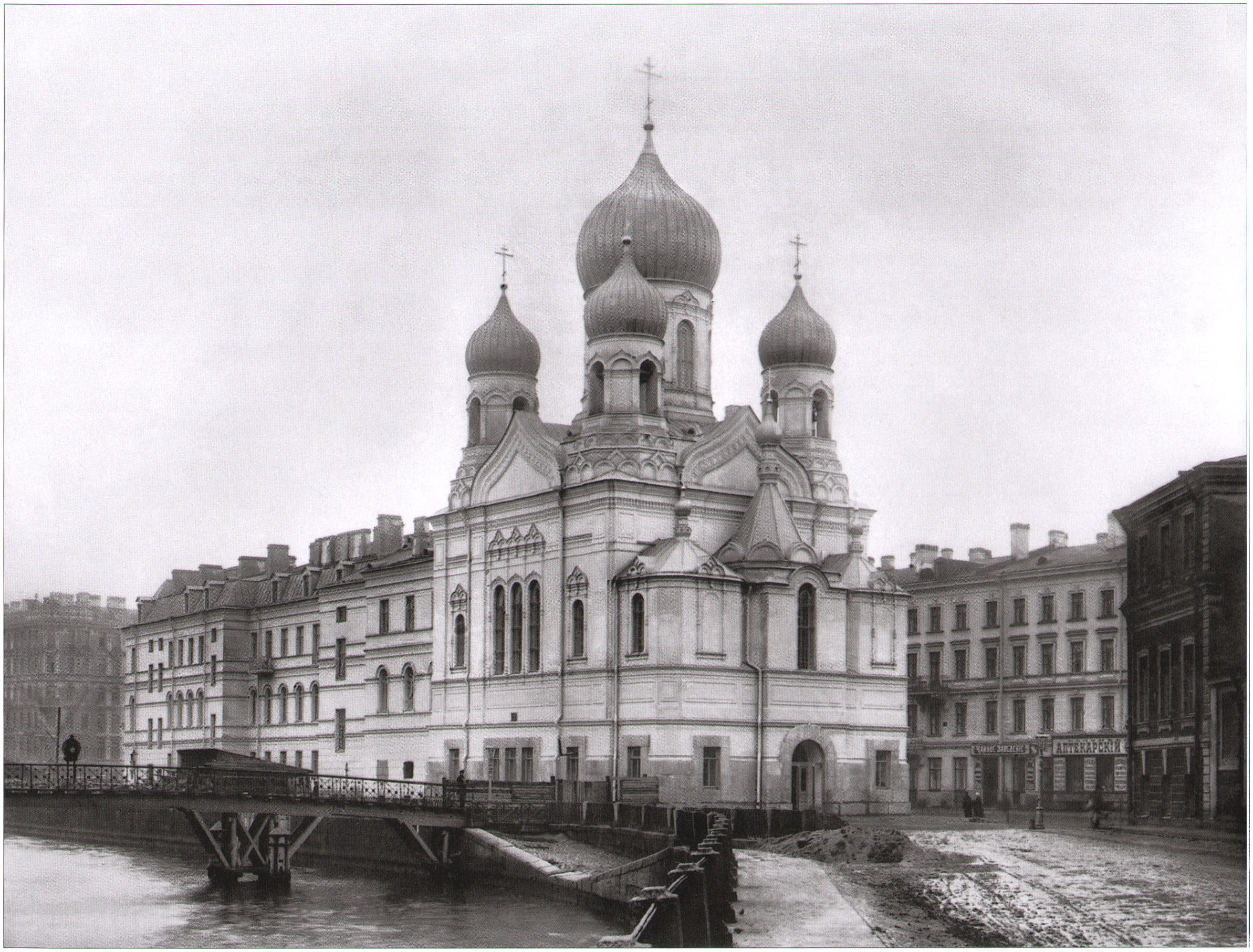
Mogilyovsky pedestrian bridge.
1906— 1911

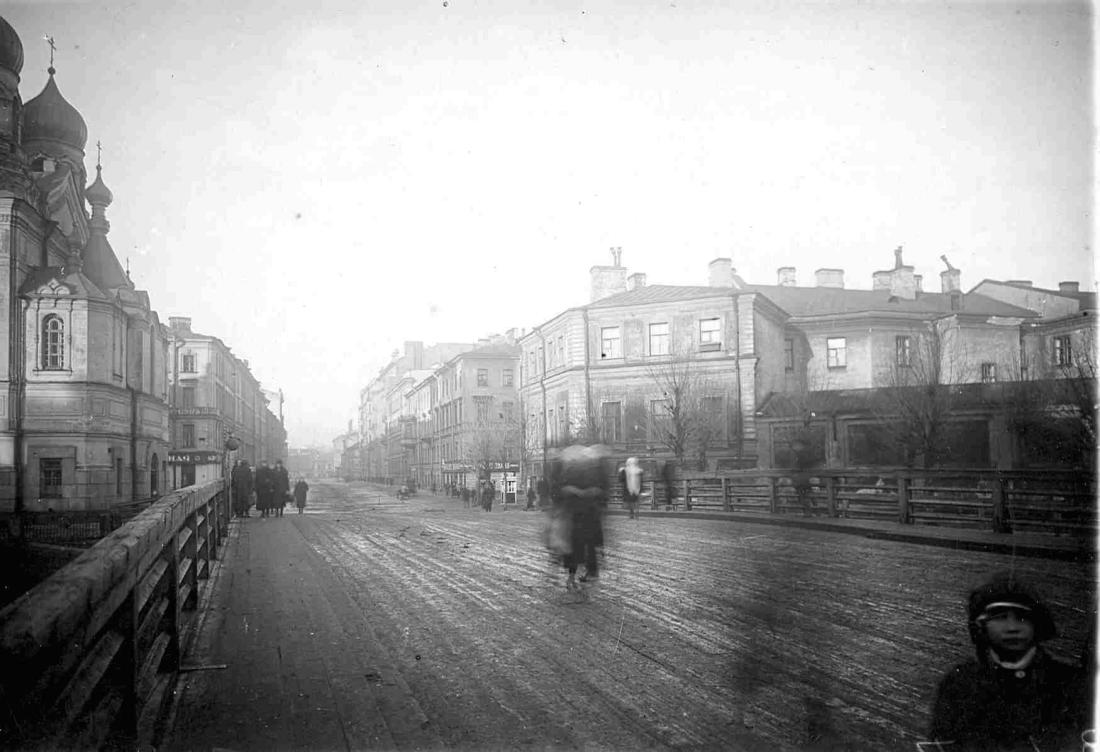
Carriageway of the bridge.
1920

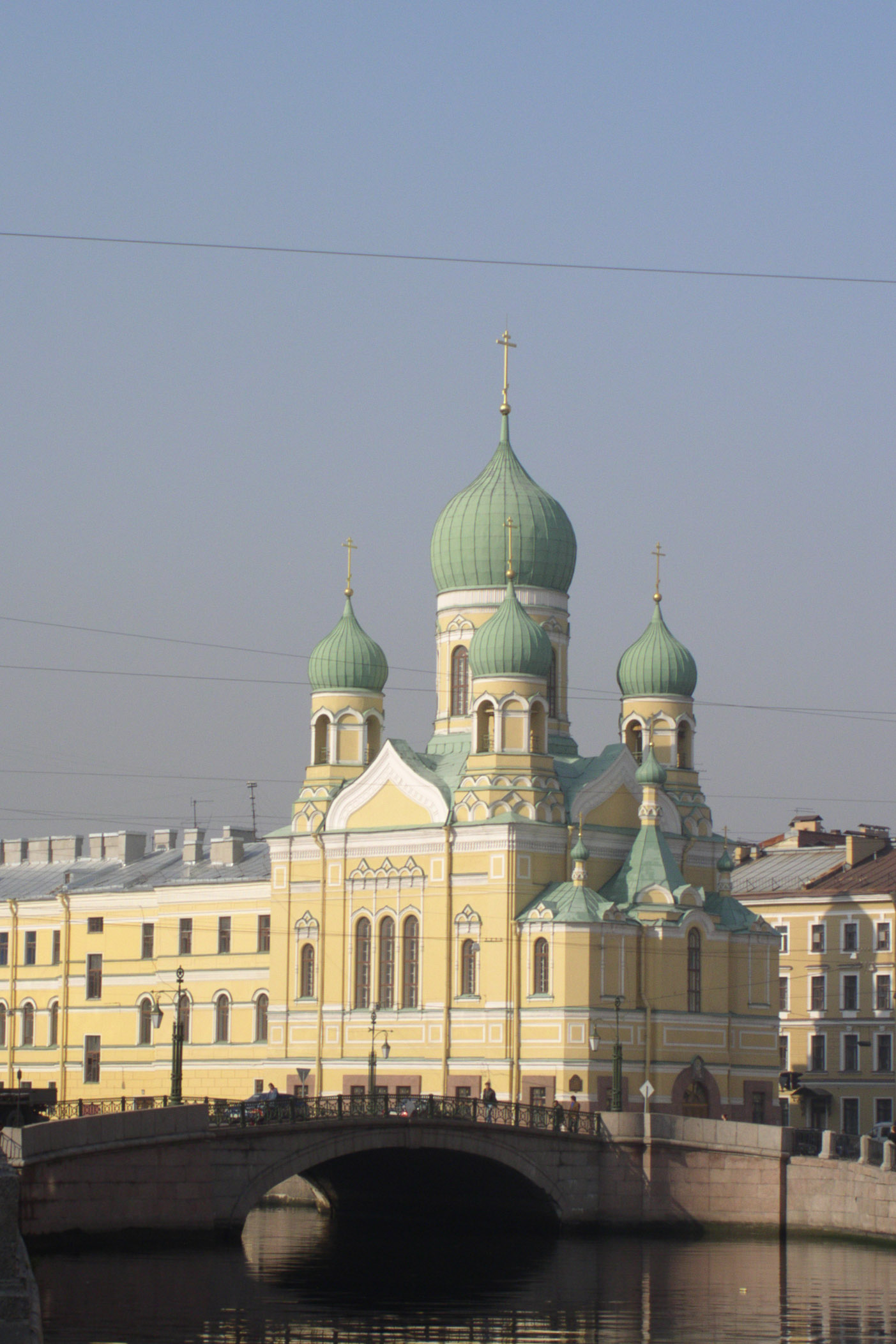
Bridge and St. Isidor's Church
2007

== Construction ==
Mogilyovsky Bridge is a single-span reinforced concrete arch bridge. The superstructure is a reinforced concrete double-hinged arch. The boom for lifting the arch was 2.28 m. The abutments are massive reinforced concrete, on a pile foundation, and are faced with granite. The facades are faced with pink granite with rustic stone on the interior. The length of the bridge is 28.3 м, and the width is 24 м.

The bridge is designed for the movement of vehicles and pedestrians. The carriageway of the bridge includes 4 lanes for traffic. The roadway and sidewalks are covered with asphalt concrete. The sidewalks are separated from the roadway by a high granite parapet. Cast iron railings of artistic casting of the lattice type end on the abutments with a granite parapet. At the entrances to the bridge, lamps, stylized in Empire style, with hexagonal lanterns are installed. The appearance of the modern Mogilyovsky Bridge is close to the architecture of St. Petersburg buildings of the 19th century.

== Sources ==
- Tumilovich, Е. V.; Altunin, S. Е. (1963). Bridges and embankments of Leningrad. Album. Moscow: Publishing House of the Ministry of Public Amenities of the RSFSR.
- Novikov, Y. V. (1991). Bridges and Embankments of Leningrad. Leningrad: Lenizdat.
