= Bank Bridge =

Bridge in Saint Petersburg, Russia

Coordinates: 59°55′56″N 30°19′30″E

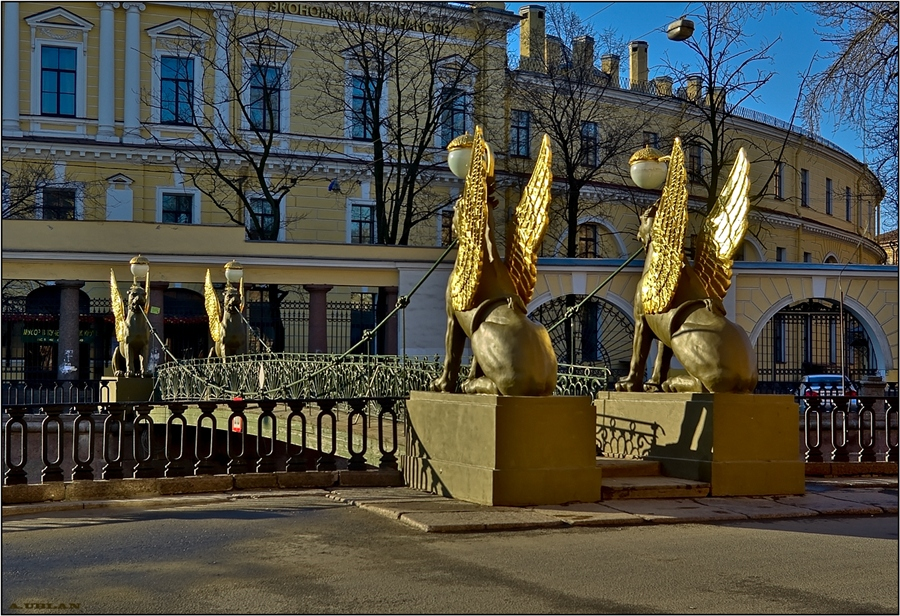
Gilded wings of lion statues

Bank Bridge (Russian: Bankovsky most, Банковский мост) is a 25 m (82 ft) long and 3.1 m (10 ft) wide single-span beam pedestrian bridge crossing the Griboyedov Canal near the former Russian Assignation Bank in Saint Petersburg, Russia. It connects Kazansky Island and Spassky Island in the city's Tsentralny District. The bridge is in front of, and takes its name from, the former Assignation Bank building (now housing the Saint Petersburg State University of Economics).

The bridge was one of six suspension bridges built between 1823 and 1826. The design for the Bank Bridge, and another farther upstream (later known as the Bridge of Lions), were approved on 18 February 1825, with construction expected to be completed by October of that year. Difficulties during the construction process delayed completion until the middle of the following year. It opened on 24 July [N.S. 5 August] 1826, with more than 9,000 people crossing it on the opening day. The bridge engineer was Wilhelm von Traitteur, who conceived of a pedestrian separation structure suspended by cables. He was an engineer who also built other bridges over the Griboyedov Canal, Fontanka and Moika. The general management of the bridge construction was carried out by colonel E. A. Adam.

The bridge has sculptures of four winged lions crowning the abutments. They were designed by sculptor Pavel Sokolov (1764–1835), who also contributed lions for Bridge of Lions and sphinxes for Egyptian Bridge. Casting the metal parts for the bridge was carried out by the Aleksandrovsky Iron Foundry, but the chains were delayed until December, and the lions until March 1826. The bridge began to be assembled in spring that year, with the Bridge of Lions opening on 1 July 1826, and the Bank Bridge on 24 July. von Traitteur wrote "regarding the lions and griffins themselves, I do not in any way claim their appearance to be accurate, for it is the sculptor's job to give their models all the beauty they are capable of. Since this work requires a talented artist and the necessary time, I referred this matter to Academician Sokolov, whom I know for his talent." The company paying for the bridge objected to the price of Sokolov's work, who charged 1,000 rubles per statue, but von Traitteur insisted "this item is not subject to negotiation." Sokolov sculpted the griffins between May and September 1825, and created alabaster molds. They were initially intended to be embossed from copper sheets, but were later cast in cast iron, with only the wings made from copper, which, along with the small decorations, were gilded.

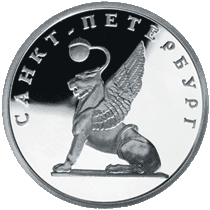
A lion of the Bank Bridge on a 1 ruble coin

The bridge underwent numerous repairs and restorations, as well as structural modifications. In 1949 the wooden cover of the bridge was repaired, and later in 1951–1952 the wooden bearing structure of the bridge was replaced by a metal one. In 1967 and 1988 the gilding of the lions' wings was renovated. In 1997 the sculptures and handrail lattice were restored. In 2007-2008 Griboyedov Canal Embankment from Kazan Cathedral to the Bank Bridge was renovated. Today the bridge is one of three surviving pedestrian chain bridges in the city, along with Pochtamtsky Bridge and the Bridge of Lions. Nowadays the winged lions are the symbol of Saint Petersburg State University of Economics. The bridge has the status of an object of federal significance on the Russian cultural heritage register.
