= Footbridge =

Bridge designed solely for pedestrians

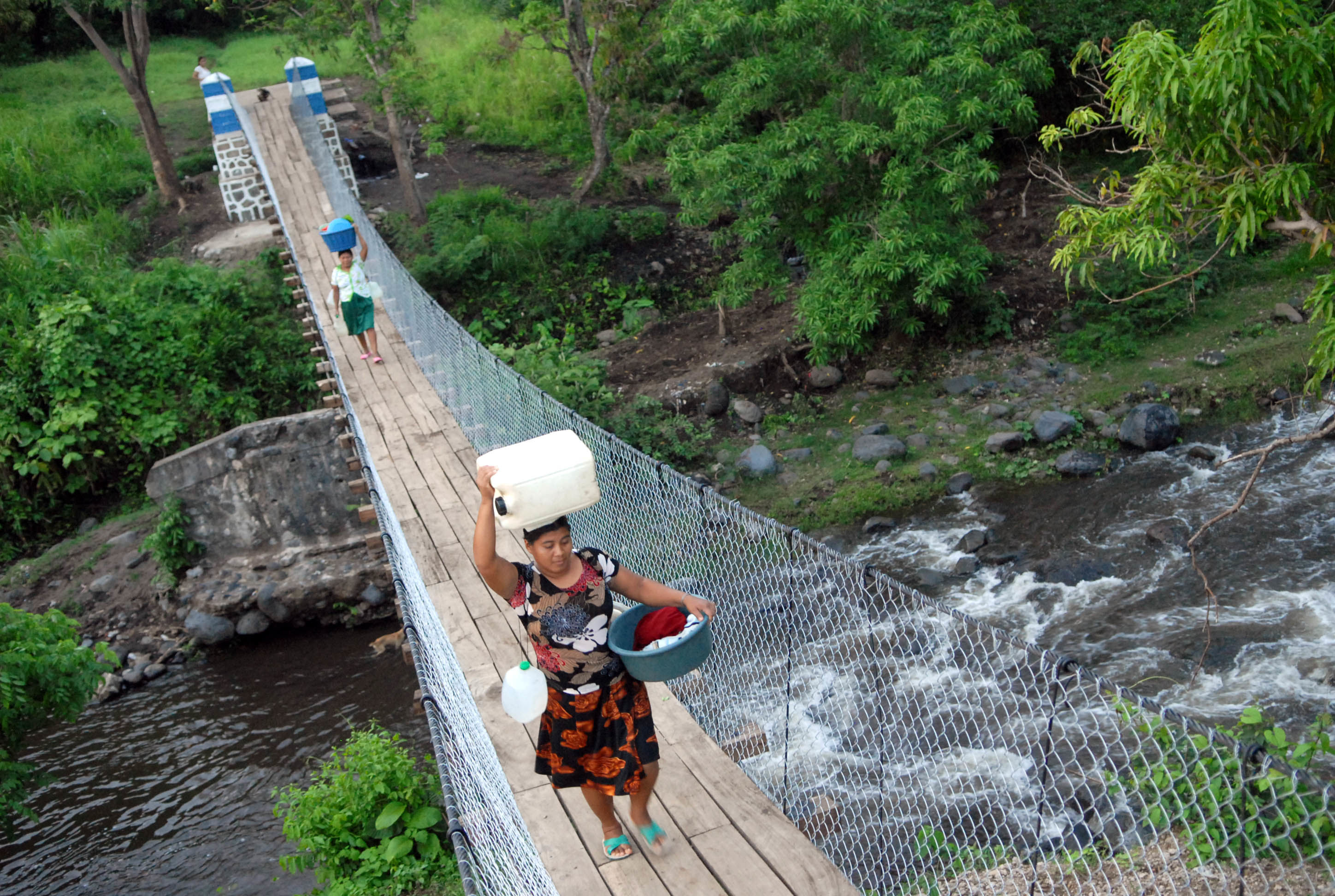
Women heading to market across a footbridge in Nahulingo, El Salvador

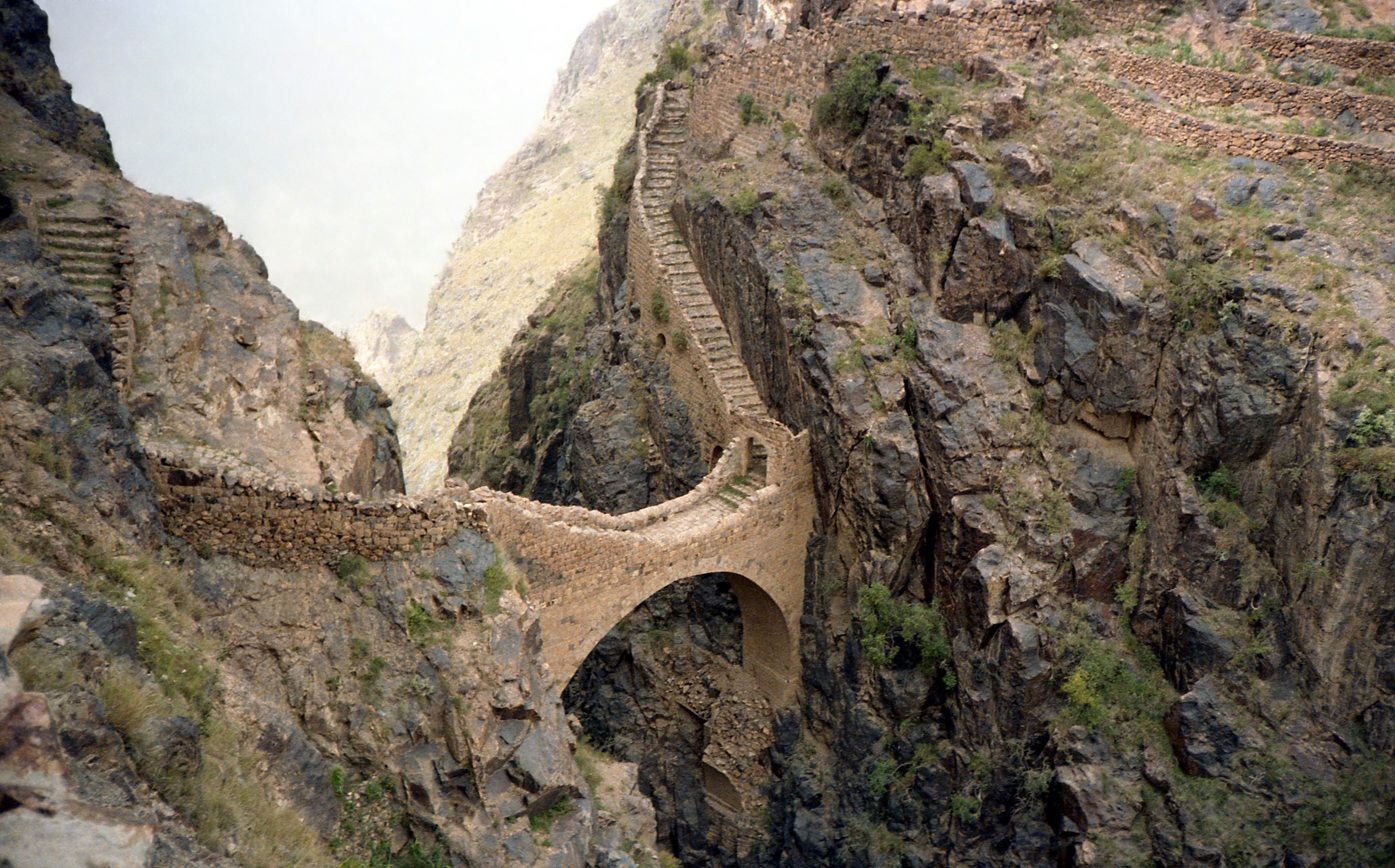
A footbridge in Shaharah District, Yemen

A footbridge (also a pedestrian bridge, pedestrian overpass, or pedestrian overcrossing) is a bridge designed solely for pedestrians. While the primary meaning for a bridge is a structure which links "two points at a height above the ground", a footbridge can also be a lower structure, such as a boardwalk, that enables pedestrians to cross wet, fragile, or marshy land. Bridges range from stepping stones – possibly the earliest man-made structure to "bridge" water – to elaborate steel structures. Another early bridge would have been simply a fallen tree. In some cases, a footbridge can be both functional and artistic.

For rural communities in the developing world, a footbridge may be a community's only access to medical clinics, schools, businesses, and markets. Simple suspension bridge designs have been developed to be sustainable and easily constructed in such areas using only local materials and labor.

An enclosed footbridge between two buildings is sometimes known as a skyway. Bridges providing for both pedestrians and cyclists are often referred to as greenbridges and form an important part of a sustainable transport system.

Footbridges are often situated to allow pedestrians to cross water or railways in areas where there are no nearby roads. They are also located across roads to let pedestrians cross safely without slowing traffic. The latter is a type of pedestrian separation structure, examples of which are particularly found near schools.

== Early history ==
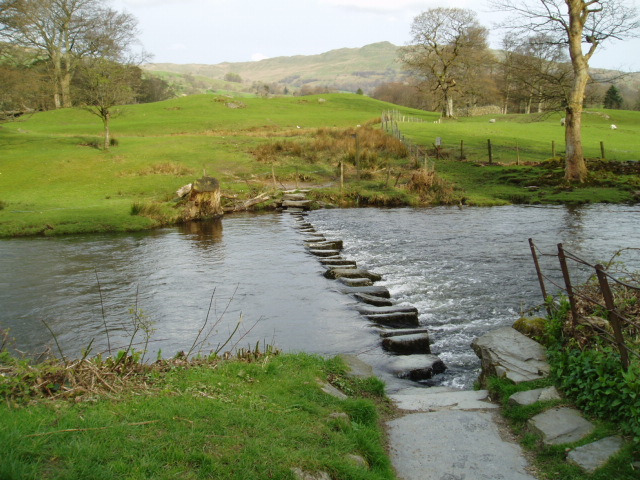
Stepping stones, across the River Rothay, in the Lake District, England

The simplest type of bridge is stepping stones, so this may have been one of the earliest types of footbridge. Neolithic people also built a form of a boardwalk across marshes; the Sweet Track and the Post Track are examples from England that are around 6,000 years old. Undoubtedly ancient peoples would also have used log bridges; that is a timber bridge that fall naturally or are intentionally felled or placed across streams. Some of the first man-made bridges with significant spans were probably intentionally felled trees.

Among the oldest timber bridges is the Holzbrücke Rapperswil-Hurden crossing upper Lake Zürich in Switzerland; the prehistoric timber piles discovered to the west of the Seedamm date back to 1523 B.C. The first wooden footbridge led across Lake Zürich, followed by several reconstructions at least until the late 2nd century AD, when the Roman Empire built a 6-metre-wide (20 ft) wooden bridge. Between 1358 and 1360, Rudolf IV, Duke of Austria, built a 'new' wooden bridge across the lake that was used until 1878 – measuring approximately 1,450 metres (4,760 ft) in length and 4 metres (13 ft) in width. On April 6, 2001, the reconstructed wooden footbridge was opened, being the longest wooden bridge in Switzerland.

A clapper bridge is an ancient form of bridge found on the moors of Devon (Dartmoor and Exmoor) and in other upland areas of the United Kingdom including Snowdonia and Anglesey, Cumbria, Yorkshire and Lancashire. It is formed by large flat slabs of stone, often granite or schist, supported on stone piers (across rivers), or resting on the banks of streams. Although often credited with prehistoric origin, most were erected in medieval times, and some in later centuries. A famous example is found in the village of Postbridge. First recorded in the 14th century, the bridge is believed to have been originally built in the 13th century to enable pack horses to cross the river. Nowadays, clapper bridges are only used as footbridges.

The Kapellbrücke is a 204-metre-long (669 ft) footbridge crossing the River Reuss in the city of Lucerne in Switzerland. It is the oldest wooden covered bridge in Europe, and one of Switzerland's main tourist attractions. The bridge was originally built c. 1365 as part of Lucerne's fortifications.

An early example of a skyway is the Vasari Corridor, an elevated, enclosed passageway in Florence, Italy, which connects the Palazzo Vecchio with the Palazzo Pitti. Beginning on the south side of the Palazzo Vecchio, it then joins the Uffizi Gallery and leaves on its south side, crossing the Lungarno dei Archibusieri and then following the north bank of the River Arno until it crosses the river at Ponte Vecchio. It was built in five months by order of Duke Cosimo I de' Medici in 1565, to the design of Giorgio Vasari.

Bank Bridge is a famous 25 metre long pedestrian bridge crossing the Griboedov Canal in Saint Petersburg, Russia. Like other bridges across the canal, the existing structure dates from 1826. The special popularity of the bridge was gained through angular sculptures of four winged lions crowning the abutments. They were designed by sculptor Pavel Sokolov (1764–1835), who also contributed lions for Bridge of Lions.

== Types ==
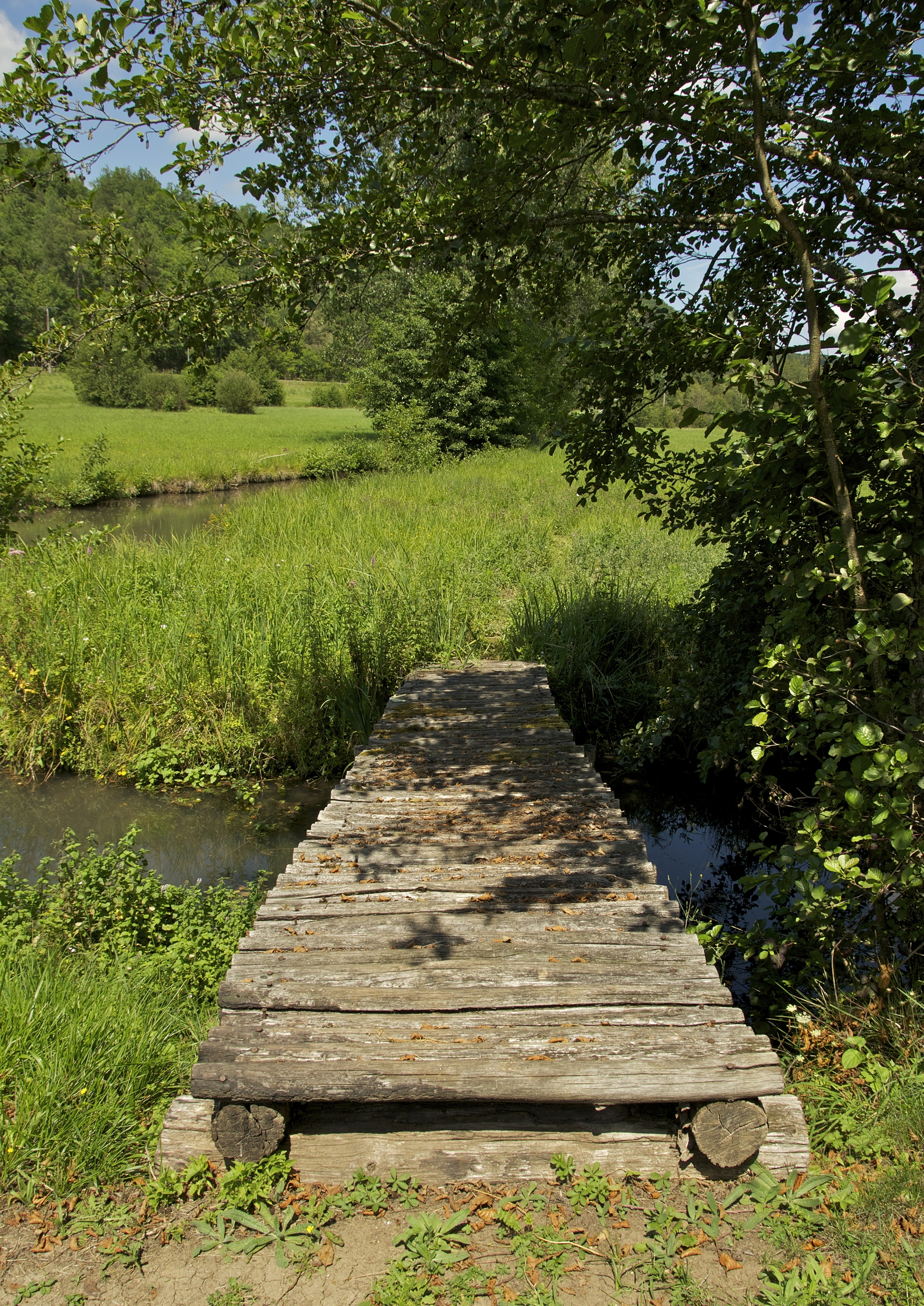
A simple French footbridge

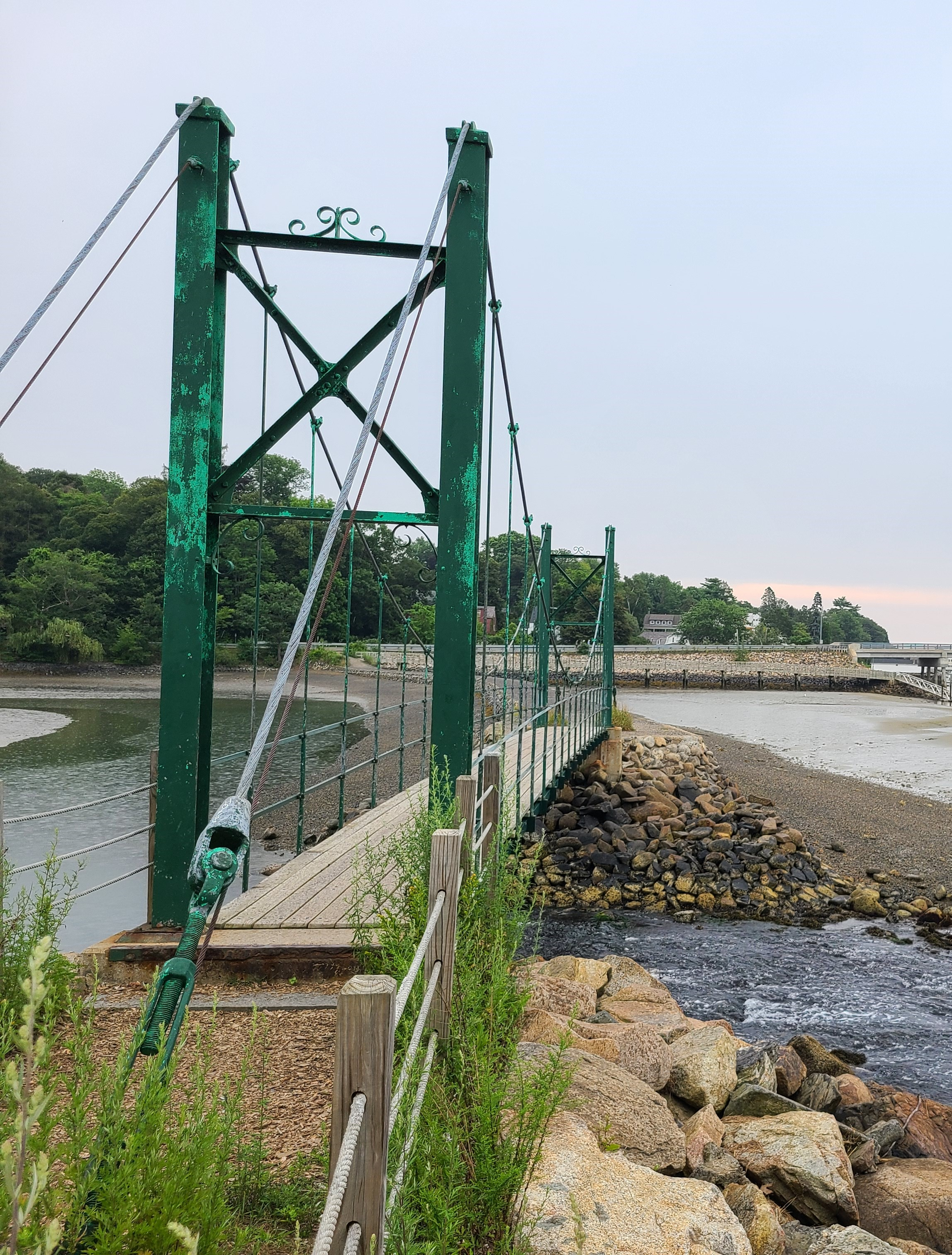
The Wiggly Bridge in York, Maine is the smallest pedestrian suspension bridge in the United States.

Types of footbridges include:

- Beam Bridge
- Boardwalk
- Clapper bridge
- Duckboards, Timber trackway, Plank road, and Corduroy road
- Moon bridge
- Simple suspension bridge
- Simple truss
- Stepping stones
- Zig-zag bridge

The residential-scale footbridges all span a short distance and can be used for a broad range of applications. Complicated engineering is not needed and the footbridges are built with readily available materials and basic tools.

Different types of design footbridges include:

- Timber footbridges
- Steel footbridges
- Concrete footbridge

Footbridges can also be built in the same ways as road or rail bridges; particularly suspension bridges and beam bridges. Some former road bridges have had their traffic diverted to alternative crossings and have become pedestrian bridges; examples in the UK include The Iron Bridge at Ironbridge, Shropshire, the Old Bridge at Pontypridd and Windsor Bridge at Windsor, Berkshire.

Most footbridges are equipped with guard rails to reduce the risk of pedestrians falling. Where they pass over busy roads or railways, they may also include a fence or other such barrier to prevent pedestrians from jumping, or throwing projectiles onto the traffic below.

=== Railways ===
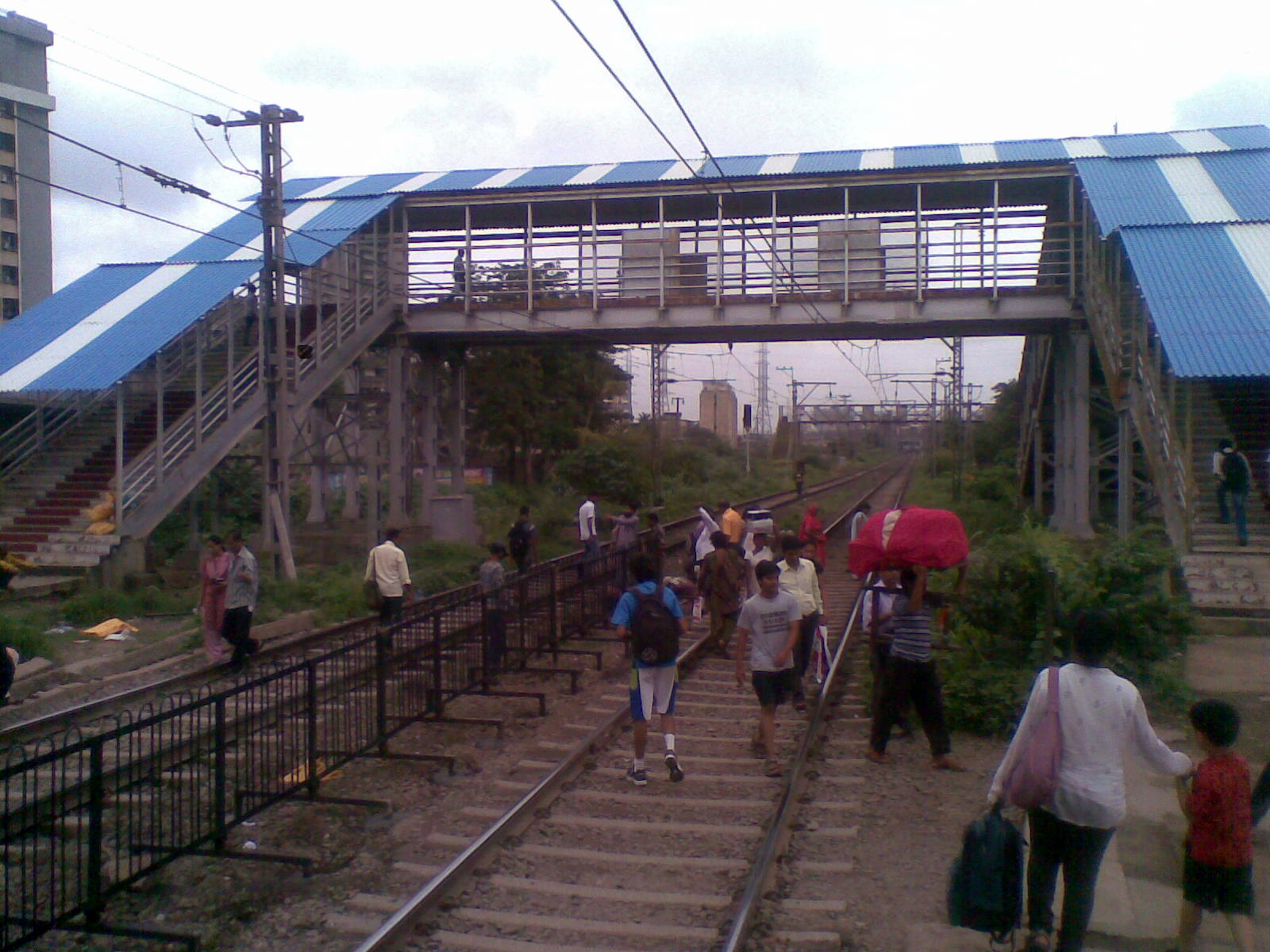
Bridge at Tilak Nagar station in Mumbai, with some people choosing to walk across the tracks

It was originally usual for passengers to cross from one railway platform to another by stepping over the tracks, but from the mid-19th century onwards safety demanded the provision of a footbridge (or underpass) at busier places. However, in some quieter areas, crossing the line by walking over the tracks is possible.

=== Catwalk ===
Narrow footbridges or walkways to allow workers access to parts of a structure otherwise difficult to reach are referred to as catwalks or cat walks. Such catwalks are located above a stage (theater catwalk) in a theater, between parts of a building, along the side of a bridge, on the inside of a tunnel, on the outside of any large storage tank in a refinery or elsewhere, etc. The walkway on the outside (top) of a railroad cars such as boxcars, before air brakes came into use, or on top of some covered hopper cars is also called a catwalk. With the exception of those on top of railroad cars, catwalks are equipped with railings or handrails.

== Design ==
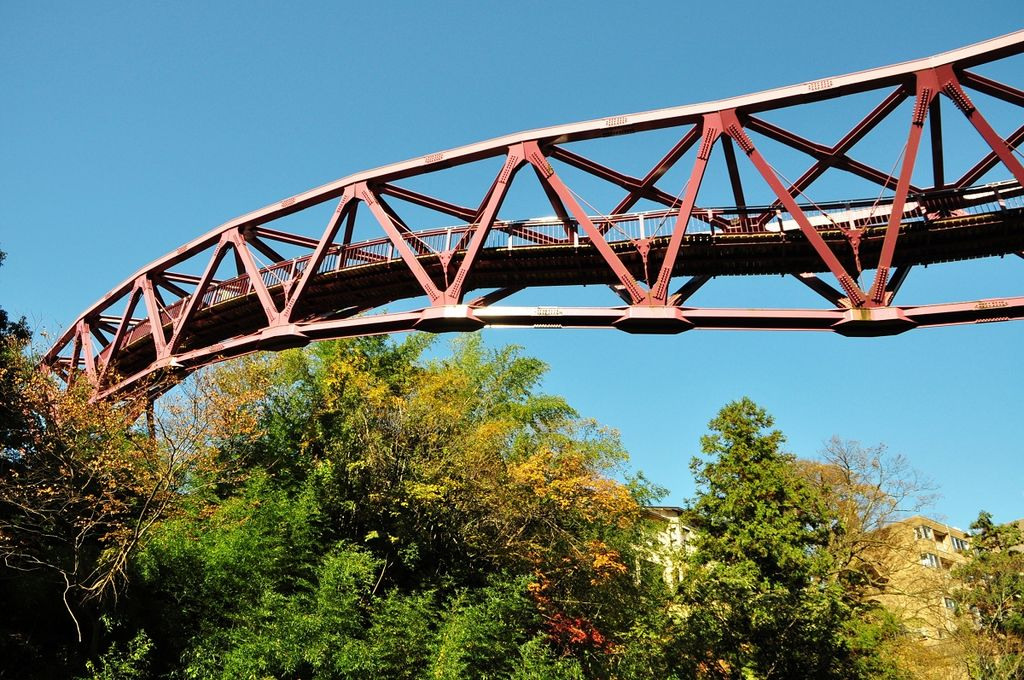
String figure-like Ayatori hashi (ja:あやとり橋) bridge in Yamanaka Onsen, Kaga, Ishikawa, Japan, 1991

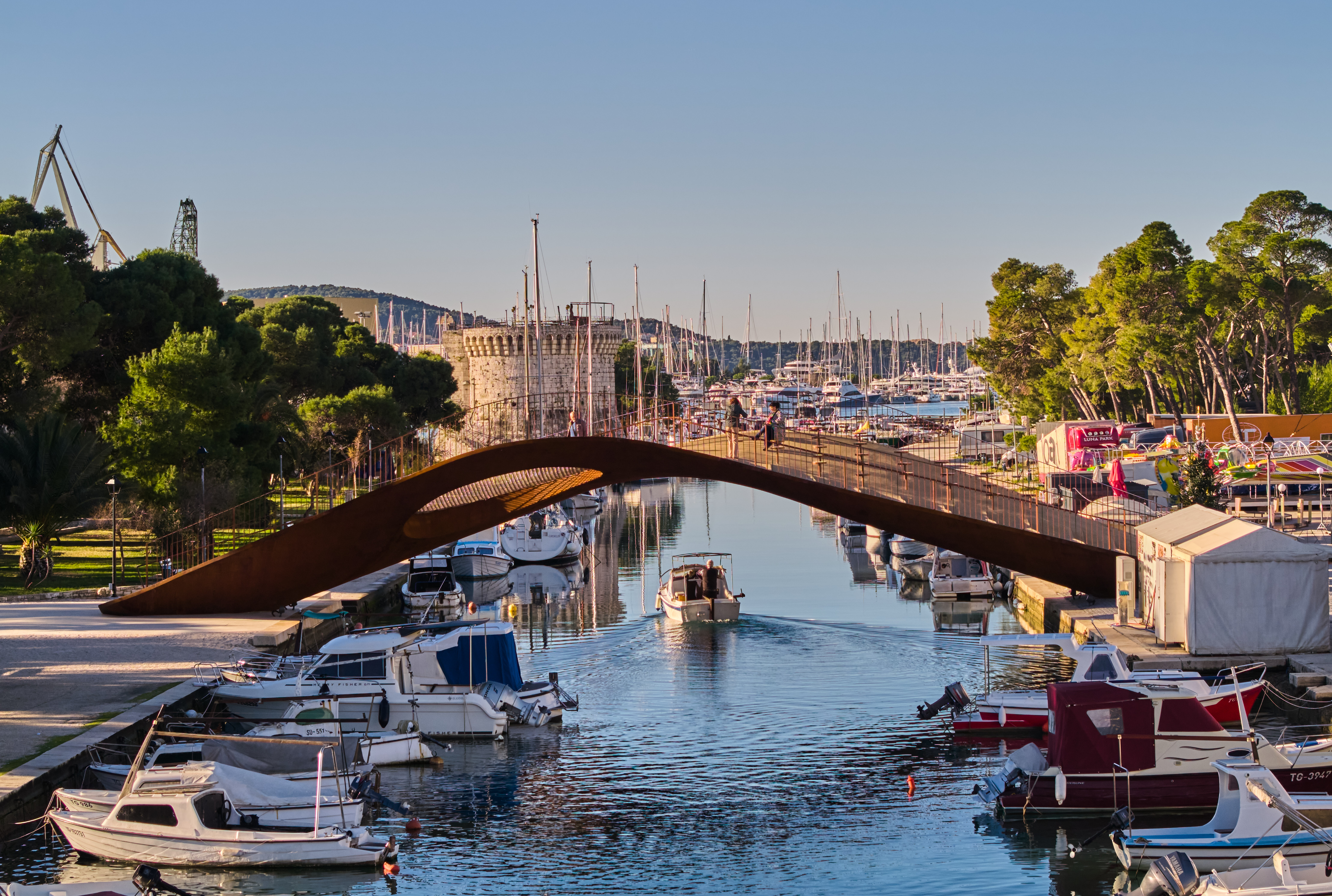
The modern Foša Bridge in Croatia serves as a scenic overlook and a place for relaxation and play

Design of footbridges normally follows the same principles as for other bridges. However, because they are normally significantly lighter than vehicular bridges, they are more vulnerable to vibration and therefore dynamics effects are often given more attention in design. International attention has been drawn to this issue in recent years by problems on the Pont de Solférino in Paris and the Millennium Bridge in London.

To ensure footbridges are accessible to disabled and other mobility-impaired people, careful consideration is nowadays also given to provision of access lifts or ramps, as required by relevant legislation (e.g. Disability Discrimination Act 1995 in the UK). Some old bridges in Venice are now equipped with a stairlift so that residents with a disability can cross them.

== Advantages ==
Much rural travel takes place on local footpaths, tracks and village roads. These provide essential access to water, firewood, farm plots and the classified road network. Communities and/or local government are generally responsible for this infrastructure.

== Disadvantages ==
Pedestrian overpasses over highways or railroads are expensive, especially when elevators or long ramps for wheelchair users are required. Without elevators or ramps, people with mobility handicaps will not be able to use the structure. People may prefer to walk across a busy road rather than climb a bridge. It is recommended that overpasses should only be used where the number of users justify the costs.

Narrow, enclosed structures can result in perceptions of low personal security among users. Wider structures and good lighting can help reduce this.

== Long footbridges ==
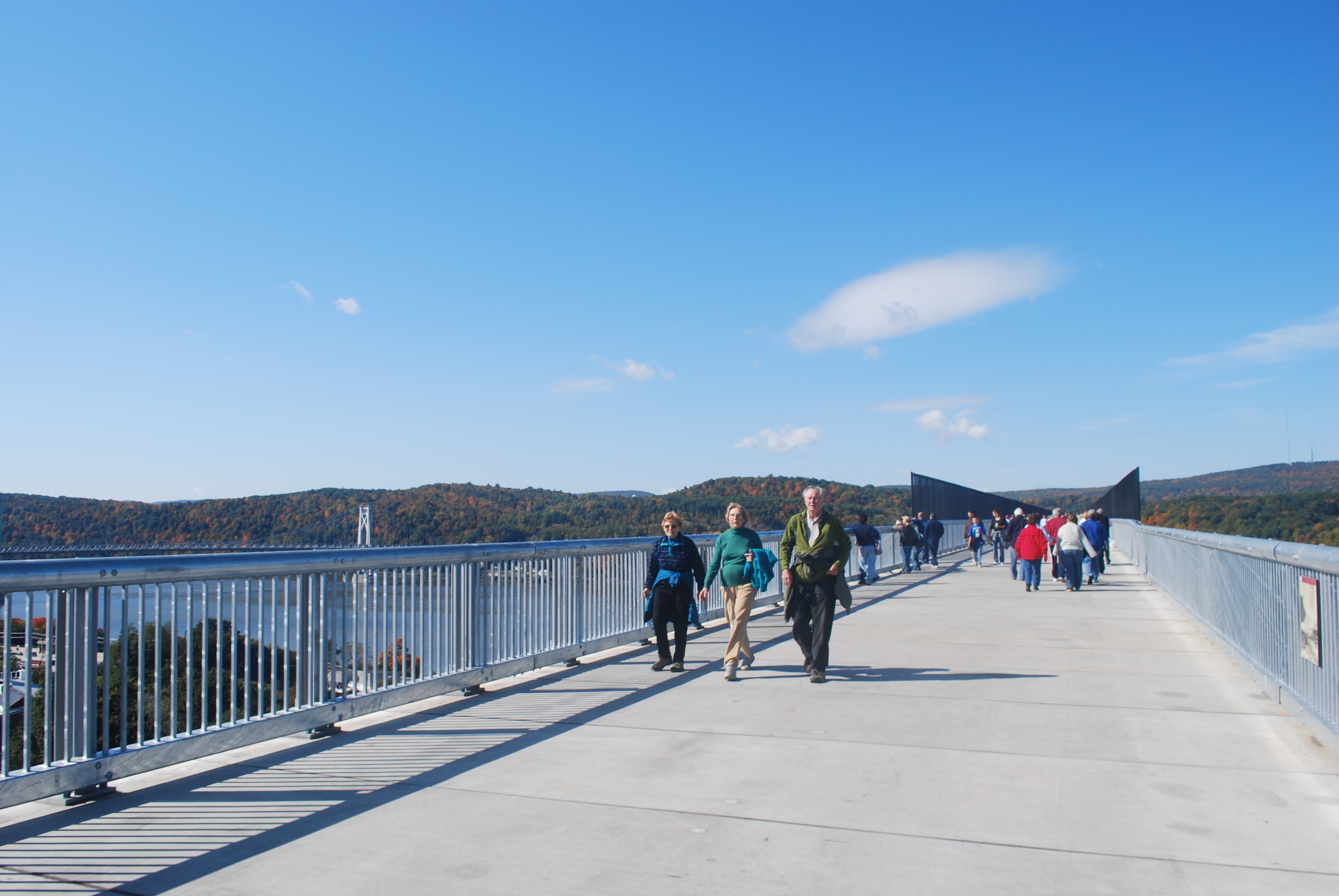
A section of the Poughkeepsie Bridge, New York State, US

The record for the longest footbridge in the world was claimed by then-New York State Governor David Paterson in a 2009 article about the walkway across the Hudson River at Poughkeepsie, New York. On July 22, 2017, the Champlain Bridge Ice Structure (French: l'Estacade Champlain), a bridge built for cyclists and pedestrians to run parallel to the Champlain Bridge from Brossard, Quebec west to Nun's Island (Île-des-Sœurs) and the Island of Montreal, was measured by a calibrated device as being 7,512 feet (2.290 km; 1.4227 mi) long, measured from where the treadway rises above the ground on each end, as close as possible to the St. Lawrence River.

Bridge of National Unity in Hungary is the longest pedestrian suspension bridge as of 2024. Before it, the record was held by Sky Bridge 721, which spans the Králický Sněžník mountain in the Czech Republic and opened in May 2022. The 721 metres (2,365 ft) bridge hangs 95 metres (312 ft) above the ground.

The United Wholesale Mortgage Pedestrian Bridge in Pontiac, Michigan is the longest enclosed pedestrian bridge, completed on October 1, 2021. The 305-metre bridge was part of a $250 million project to expand UWM's offices, which converted a former warehouse and made use of shipping containers for offices, corridors, and other spaces.

The Walkway Over the Hudson footbridge was originally built for trains and was later restored as a pedestrian walkway. The footbridge has a total length of 2,063 metres (6,768 ft). Before it was demolished in 2011, the Hornibrook Bridge, which crossed Bramble Bay in Queensland, Australia, was longer than the Poughkeepsie Bridge at 2.684 km (1.668 mi).

== In developing countries ==
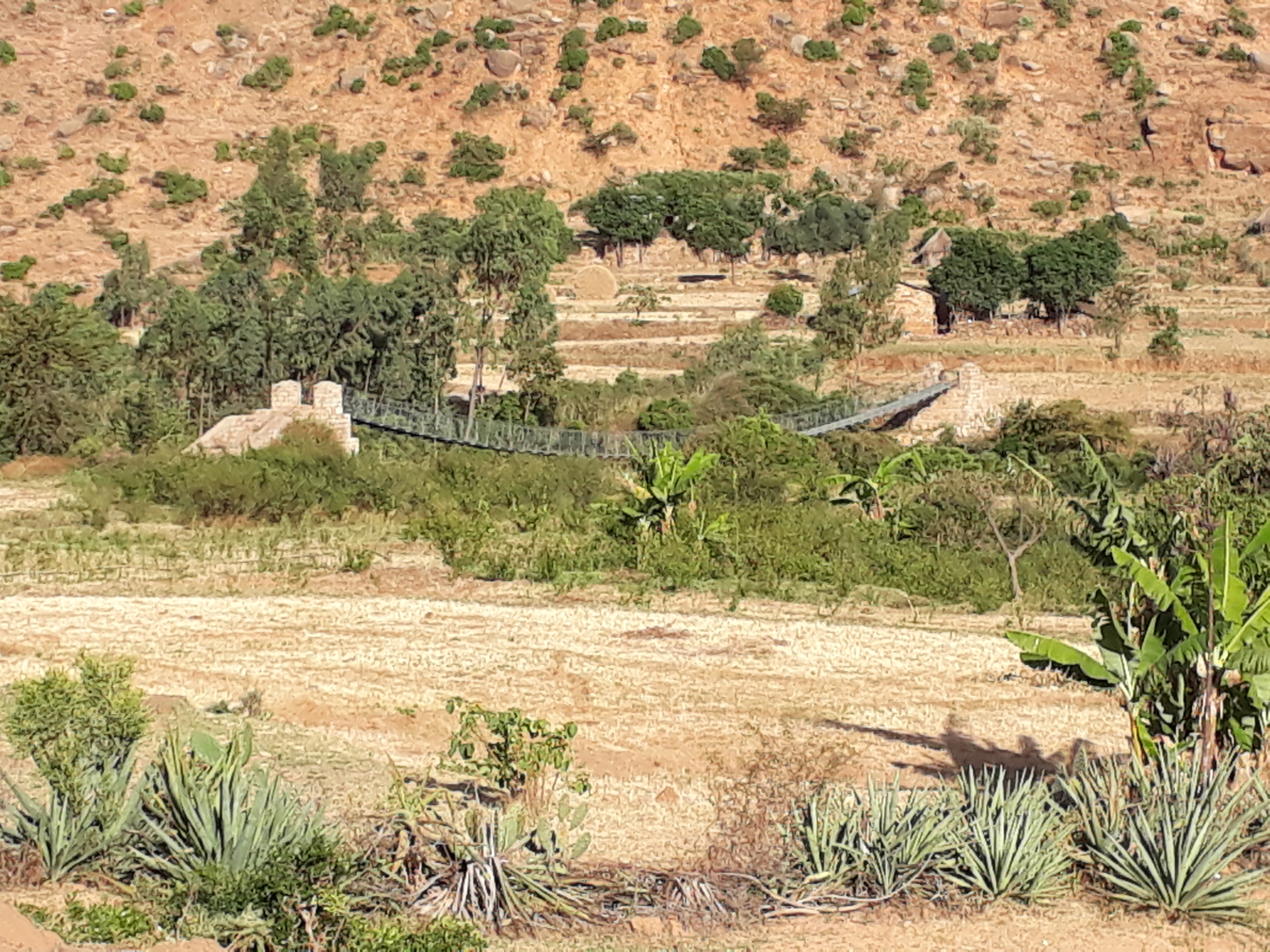
Helvetas-type footbridge, Rubaksa, Ethiopia

Since the early 1980s, several charities have developed standardized footbridge designs that are sustainable for use in developing countries. The first charity to develop such designs was Helvetas, located in Zurich, Switzerland. Designs that can be sustainably and efficiently used in developing countries are typically made available to the public gratis.

== Notable footbridges ==
- Atal Pedestrian Bridge in Ahmedabad, India
- Bank Bridge and the Bridge of Four Lions, Saint Petersburg
- Big Dam Bridge between Little Rock and North Little Rock, Arkansas
- Big Four Bridge between Louisville, Kentucky and Jeffersonville, Indiana
- Bob Kerrey Pedestrian Bridge, Omaha, Nebraska
- Capilano Suspension Bridge, British Columbia
- Central Elevated Walkway, an extensive network of footbridges, Central, Victoria City, Hong Kong
- Chain of Rocks Bridge near St. Louis, Missouri
- Corktown Footbridge, Ottawa
- Davenport Skybridge, Davenport, Iowa
- Dunlop Bridge at the Circuit de la Sarthe, Le Mans, Sarthe, France
- Esplanade Riel, Winnipeg, Manitoba
- Footbridge Network in Tsuen Wan, Tsuen Wan, Hong Kong
- Gateshead Millennium Bridge, Newcastle / Gateshead, England
- Goodwill Bridge at Brisbane, Australia
- Gorkha Bridge in the Gorkha District, Nepal
- Ha'penny Bridge, Dublin, Ireland
- Hungerford Bridge and Golden Jubilee Bridges, London, England
- Hussaini Bridge in Gilgit-Baltistan region, Pakistan
- Jade Belt Bridge in the Summer Palace, Beijing
- Kaldnes Bridge, Tønsberg, Norway
- Keel Crossing, Sunderland, England
- Kingsgate Bridge, Durham, England
- Liberty Bridge at Falls Park on the Reedy, Greenville, South Carolina
- Millennium Bridge and the high-level walkways in Tower Bridge, London, England
- Matagarup Bridge, Perth, Western Australia
- Mishima Skywalk, Mishima, Shizuoka, Japan
- Newport Southbank Bridge between Newport, Kentucky and Cincinnati, Ohio
- Pi Kun Bridge, Bangkok, Thailand
- Pont des Arts, Paris, France
- Ponte Milvio, Rome, Italy
- Ponte Sant'Angelo, Rome, Italy
- Pushkinsky and Bogdan Khmelnitsky Pedestrian bridges, Moscow, Russia
- Rolling Bridge at Paddington Basin, London, England
- Saphan Han, Bangkok, Thailand
- Saphan Hok, Bangkok, Thailand
- Shelby Street Bridge, Nashville, Tennessee
- Southbank footbridge, Southbank, Victoria
- St Elmo Bridge, Valletta, Malta
- Tournament Bridge* The Waco Suspension Bridge, Waco, Texas
- Tropicana pedestrian walkway over the Tropicana – Las Vegas Boulevard intersection, Paradise, Nevada
- Uttamanusorn Bridge in Kanchanaburi, Thailand
- Walnut Street Bridges in Harrisburg, Pennsylvania and Chattanooga, Tennessee
- Webb bridge in the Melbourne Docklands, Melbourne, Australia
- Willimantic Footbridge, Willimantic, Connecticut

== Gallery ==
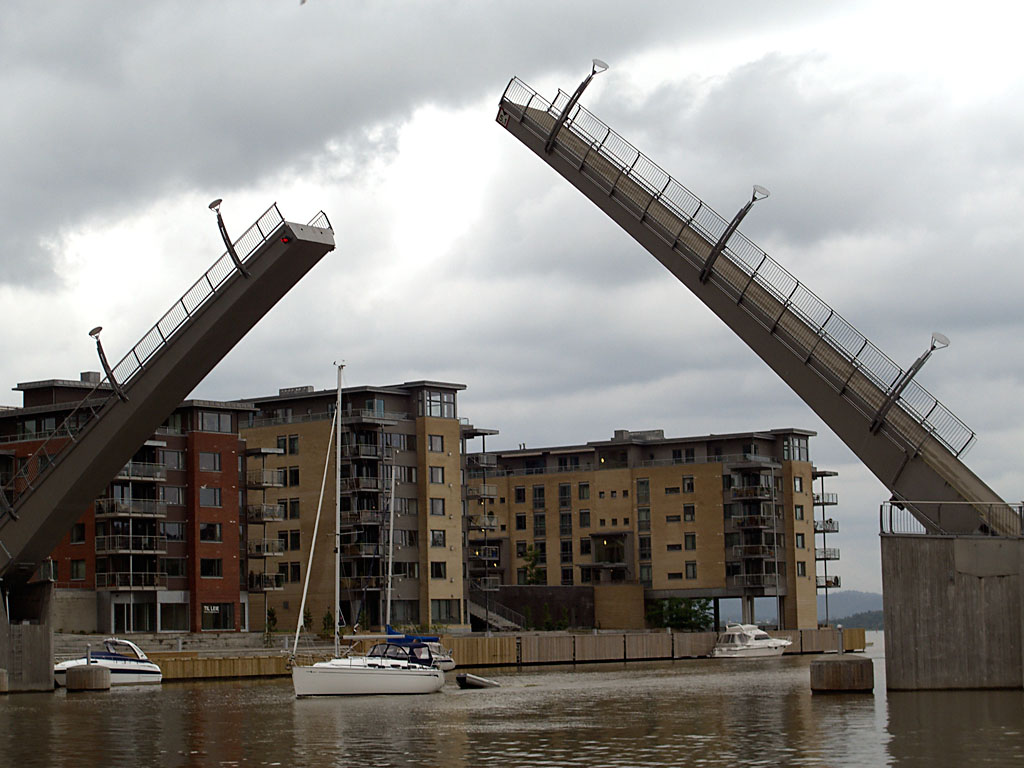
The Kaldnes Bridge in Tønsberg, Norway is a footbridge and bascule bridge.

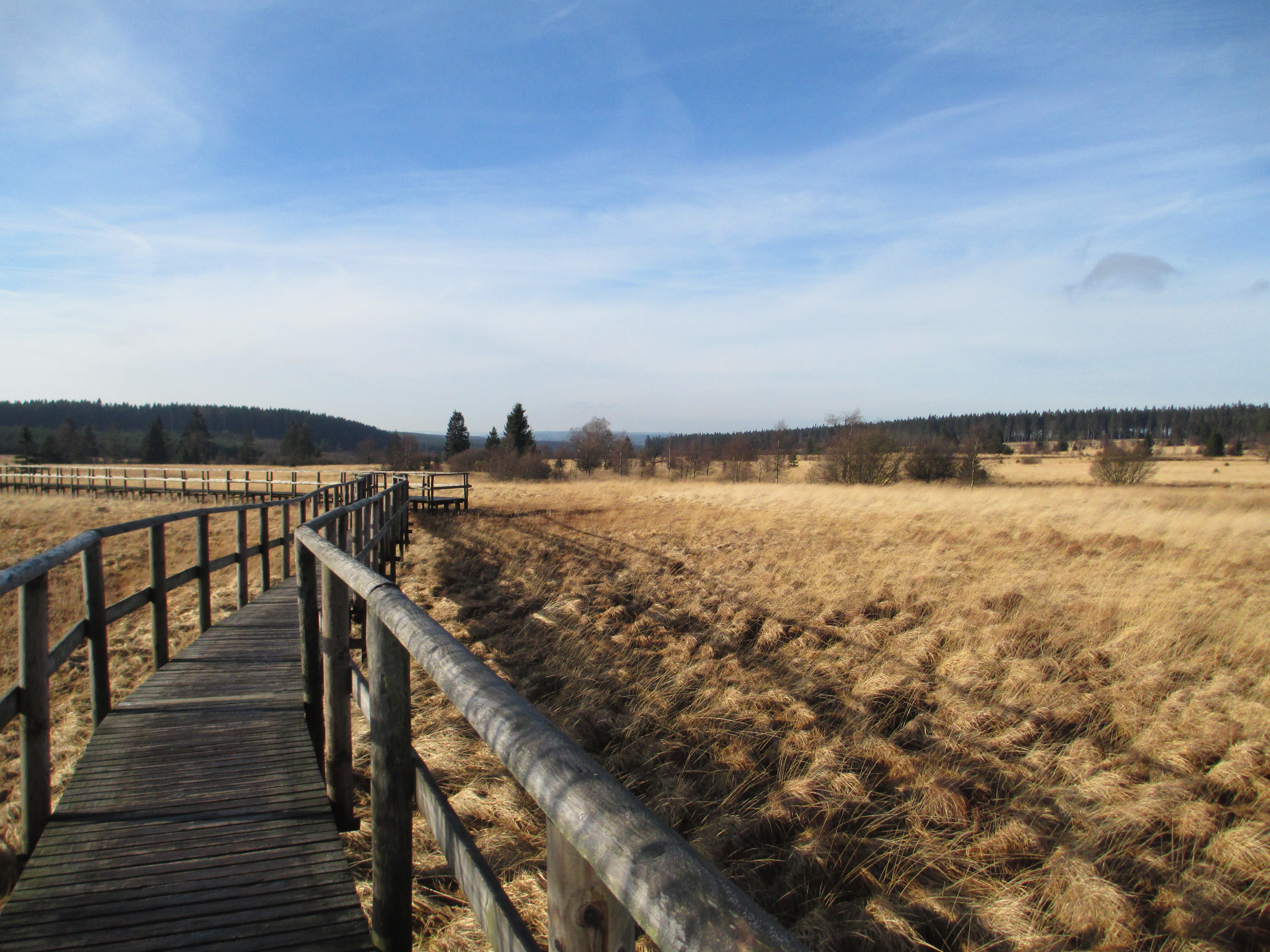
Boardwalk across the High Fens, Ardenne, Belgium

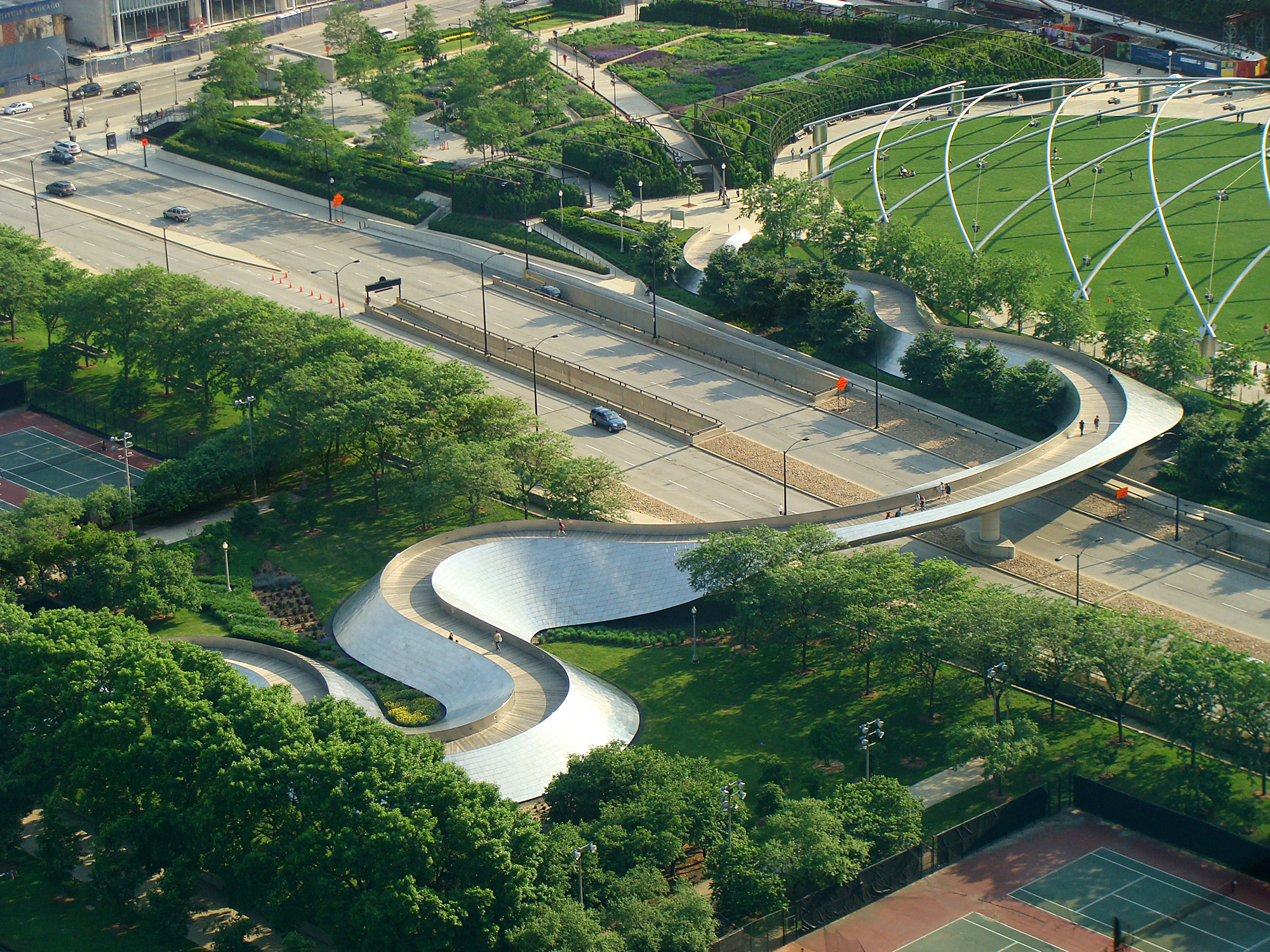
The BP Pedestrian Bridge is a concealed box girder beam bridge in Millennium Park, Chicago.

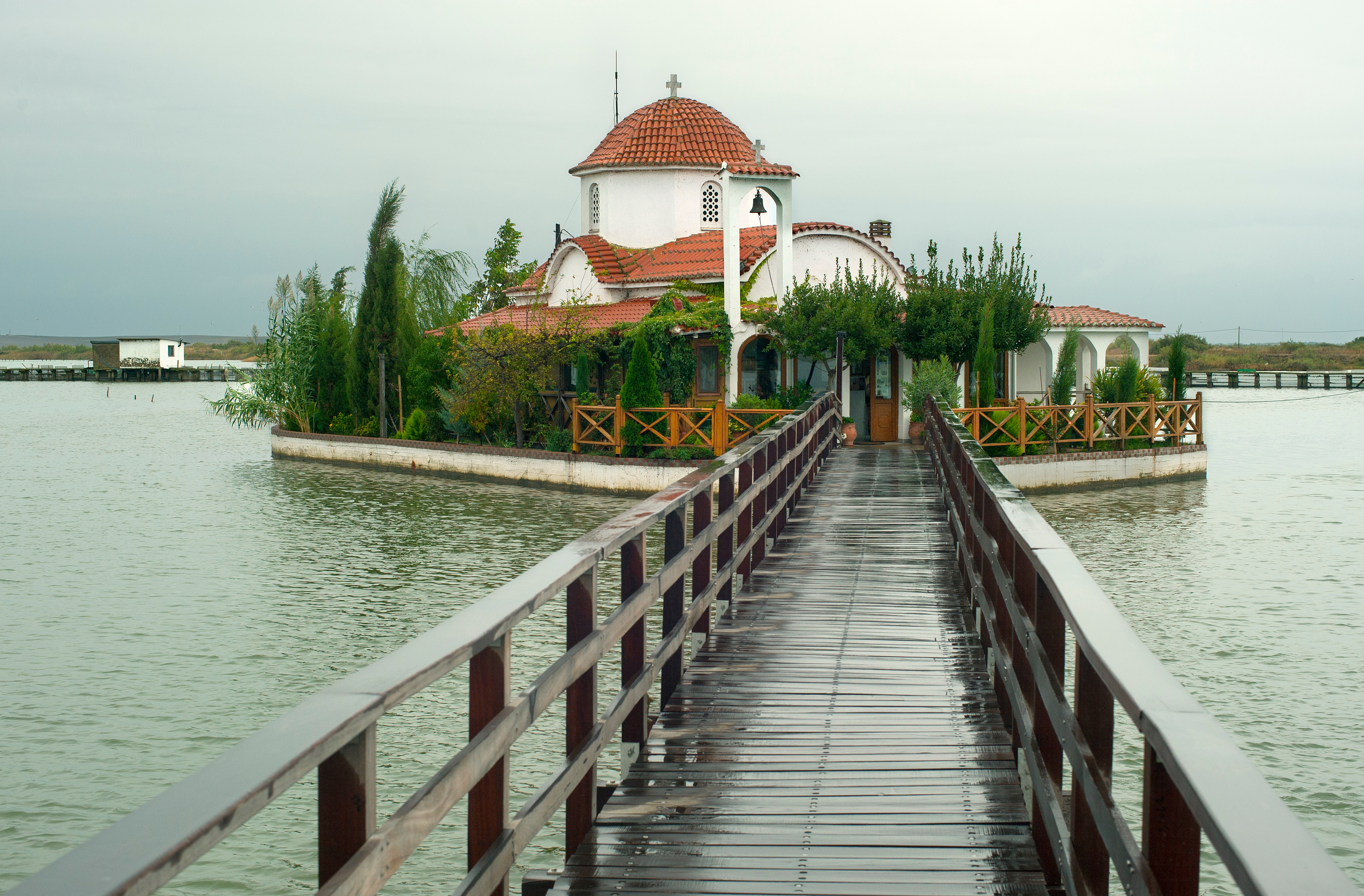
A footbridge to an orthodox church in Greece

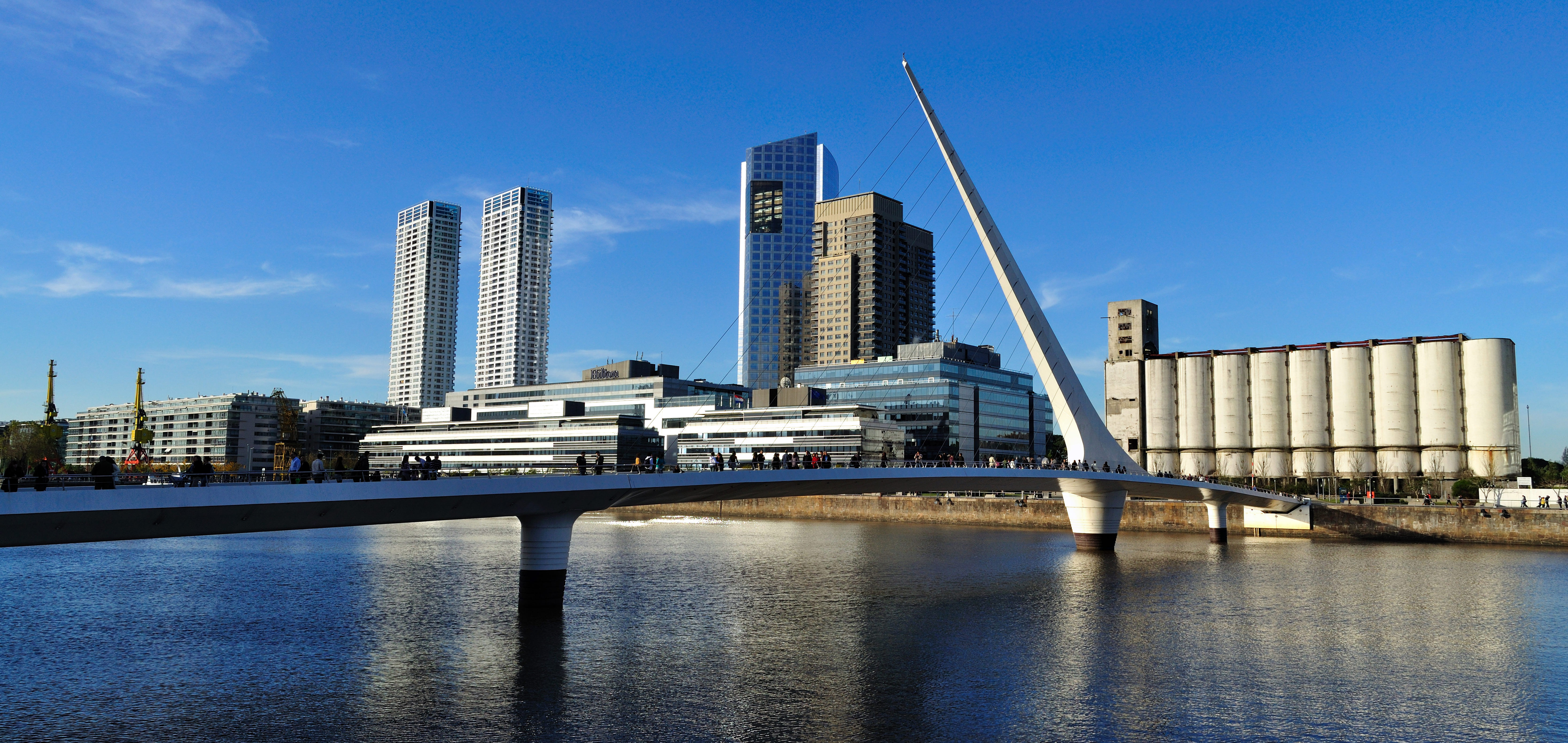
The Puente de la Mujer in Puerto Madero is a footbridge and swing bridge.

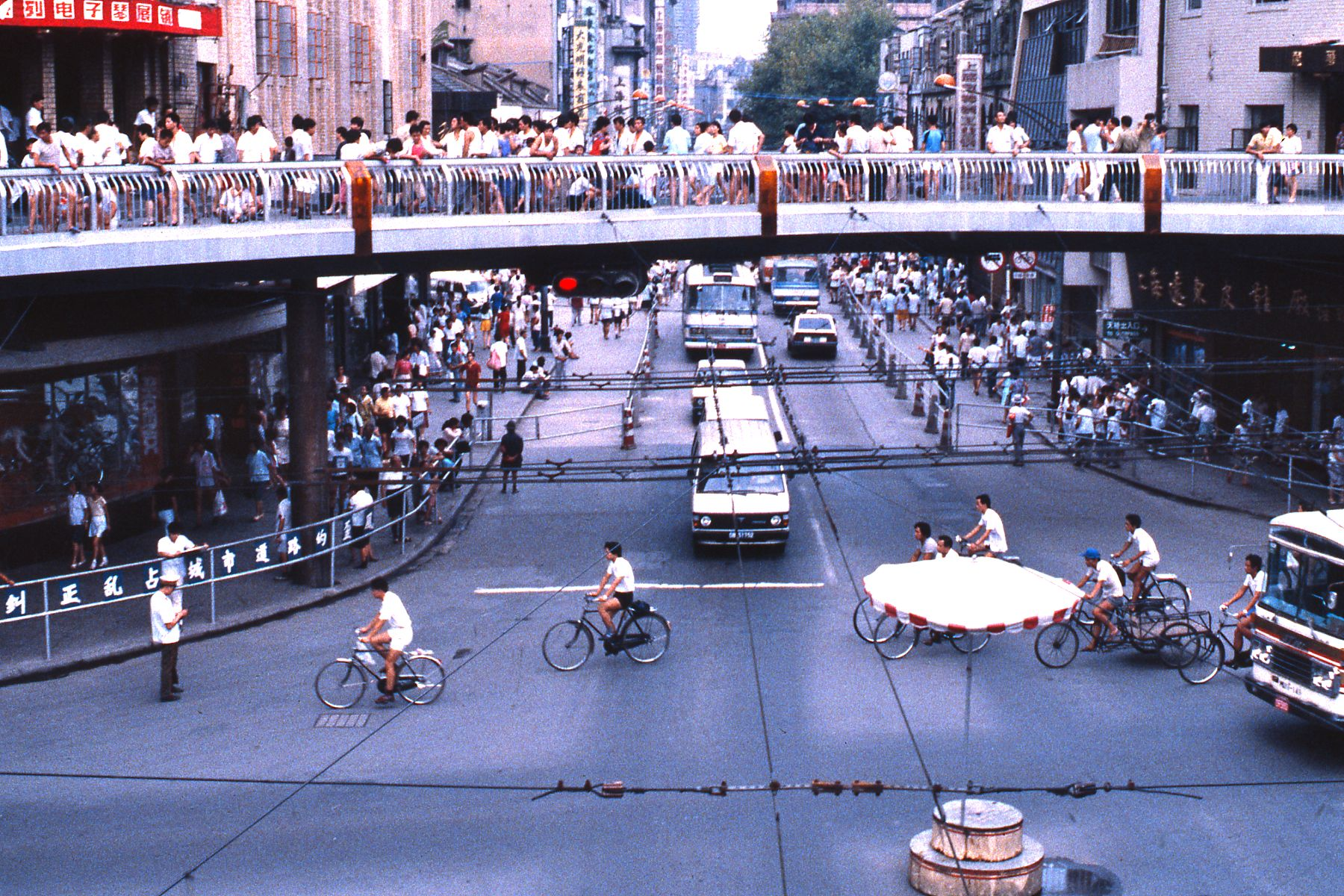
A pedestrian overcross,Nanjing Road, Shanghai

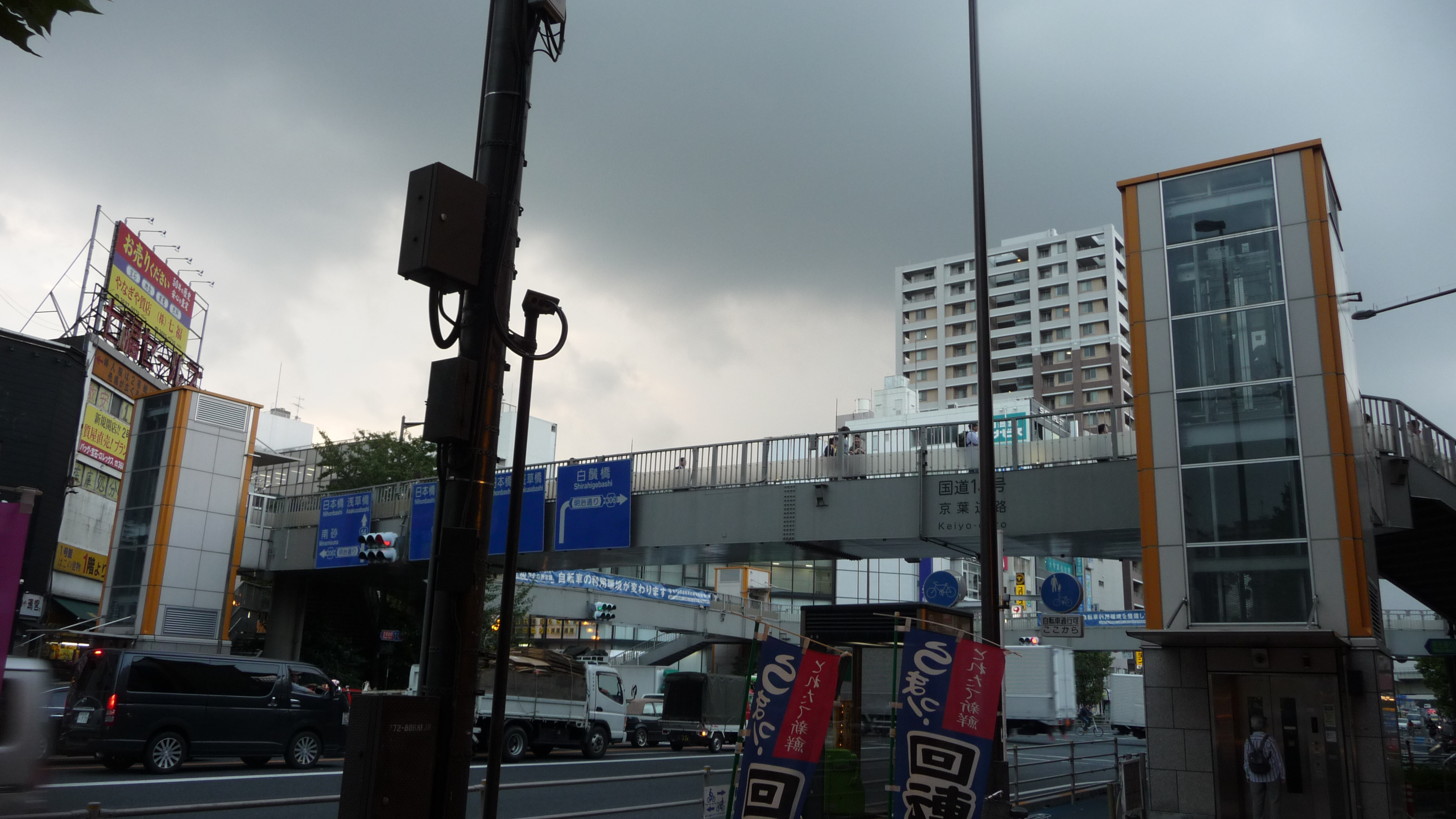
A footbridge with elevators on each corner of a four-way intersection in Tokyo

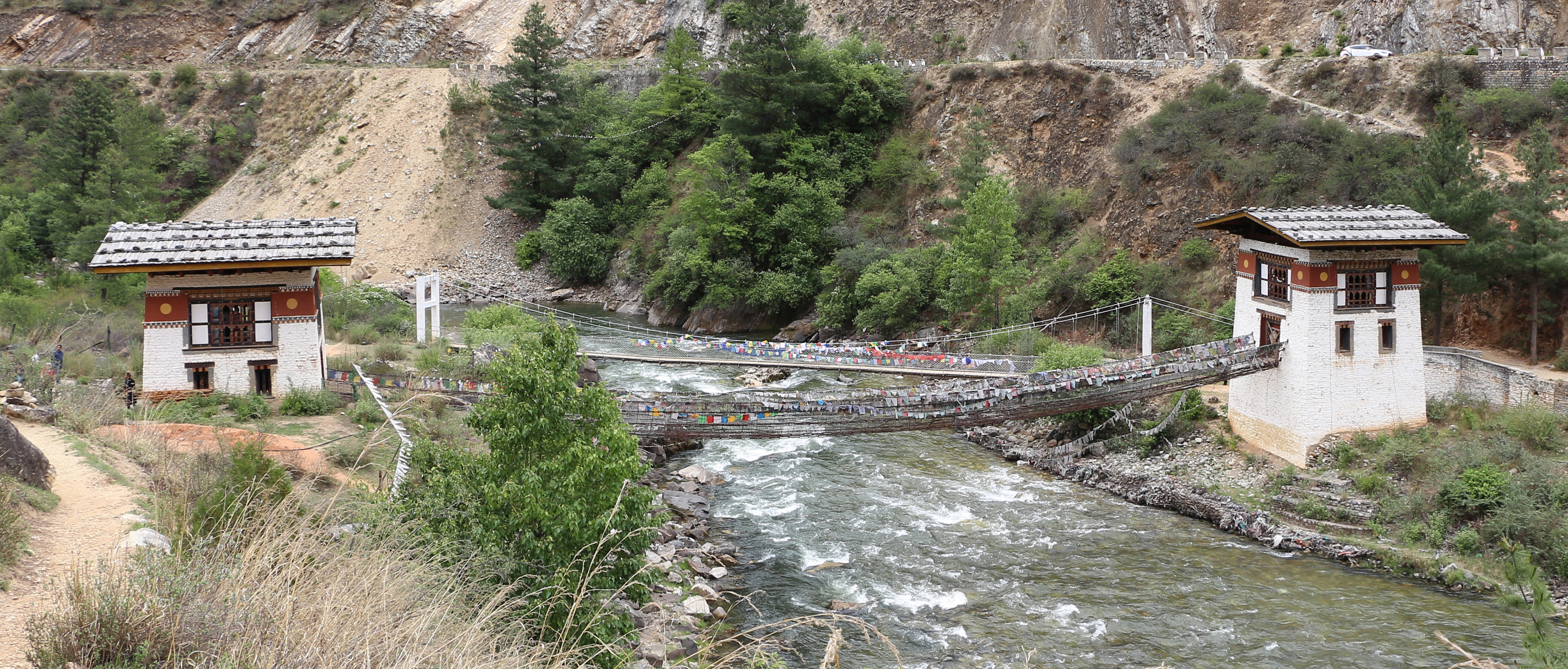
Tamchog Chakzam bridge, Bhutan

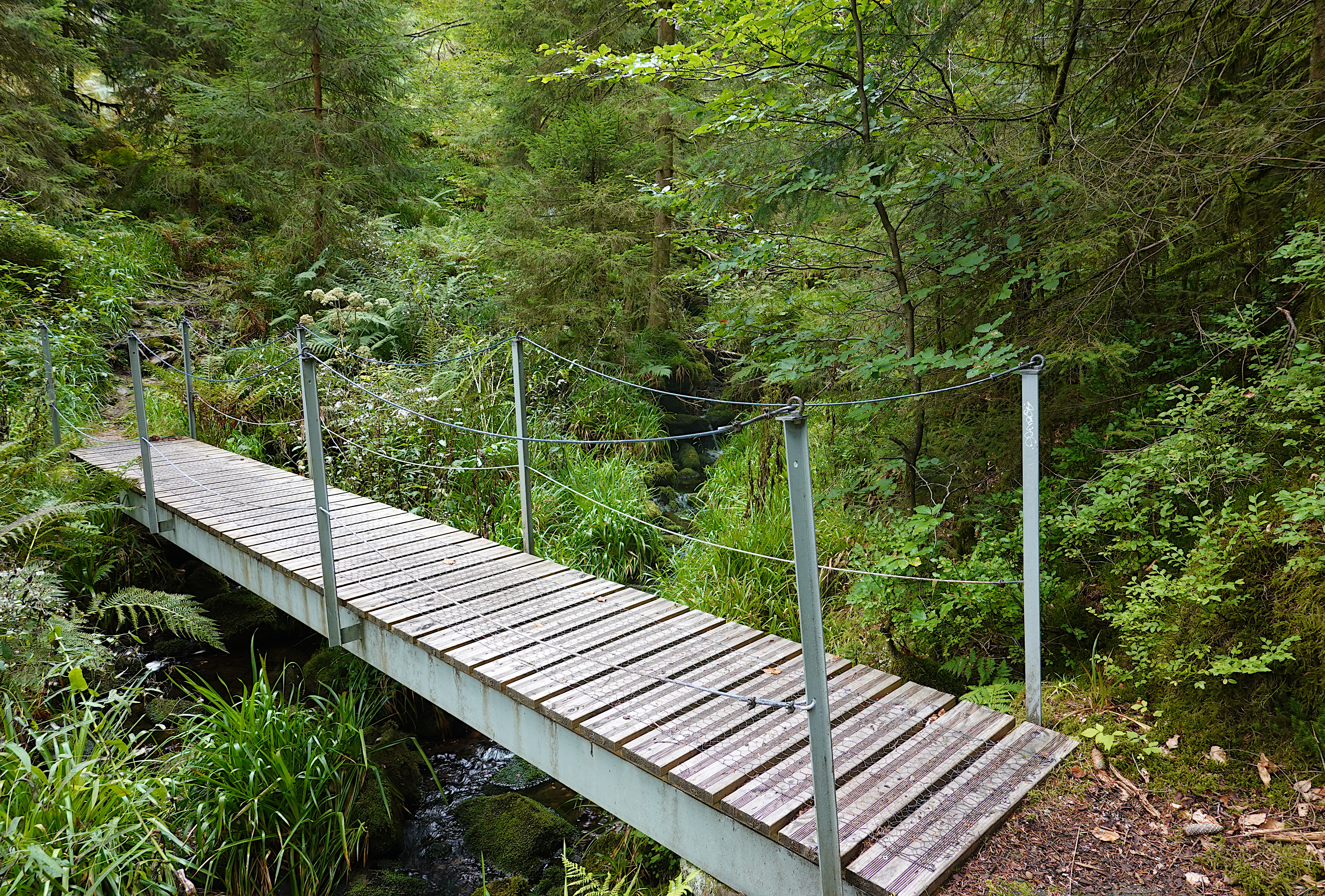
Steel footbridge over Böser Ellbach stream, Black Forest, Germany

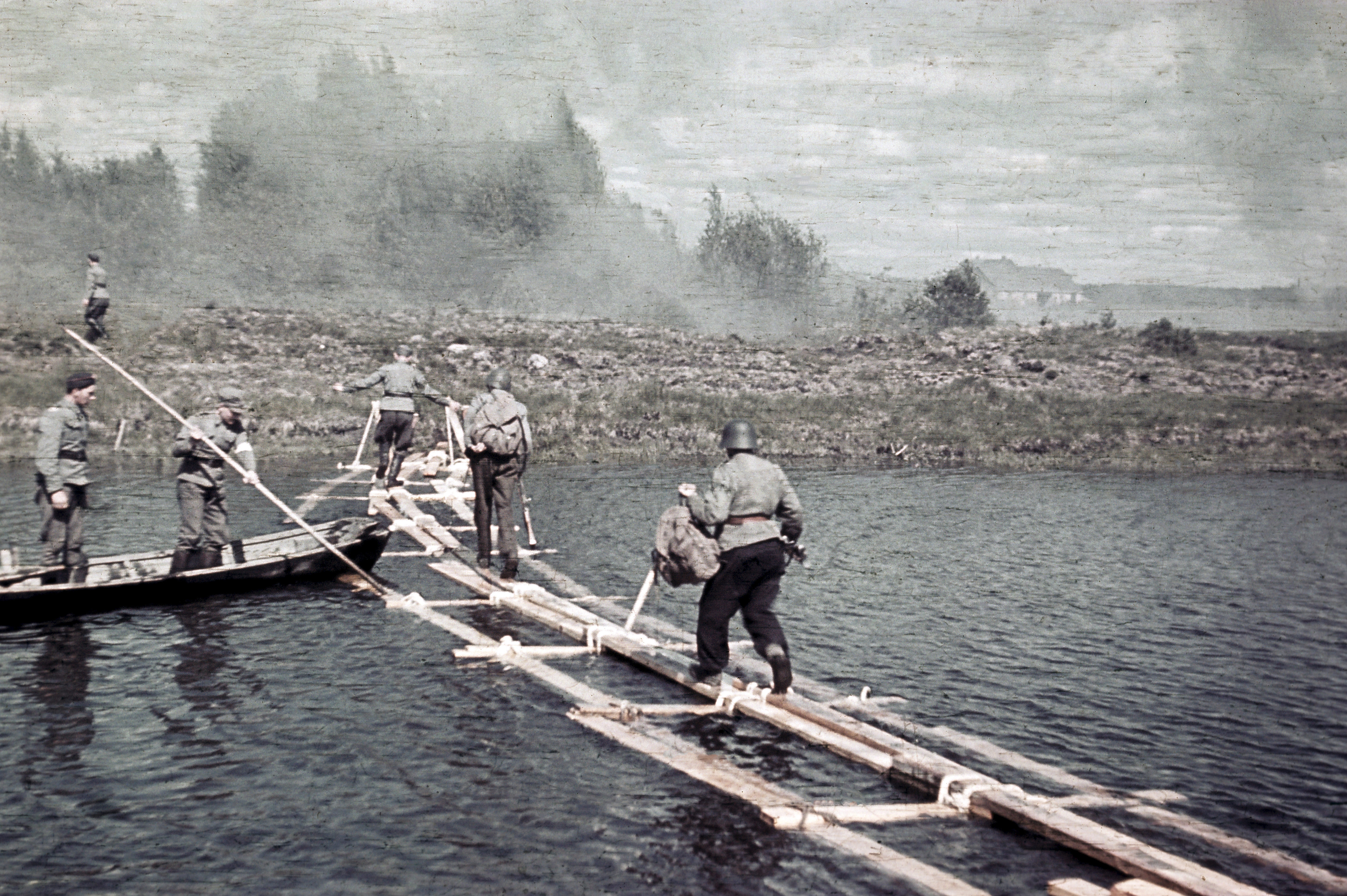
A floating foot bridge of the Iivari's quick bridge model, in use by Finnish soldiers during the Continuation War

== Bicycle bridge ==
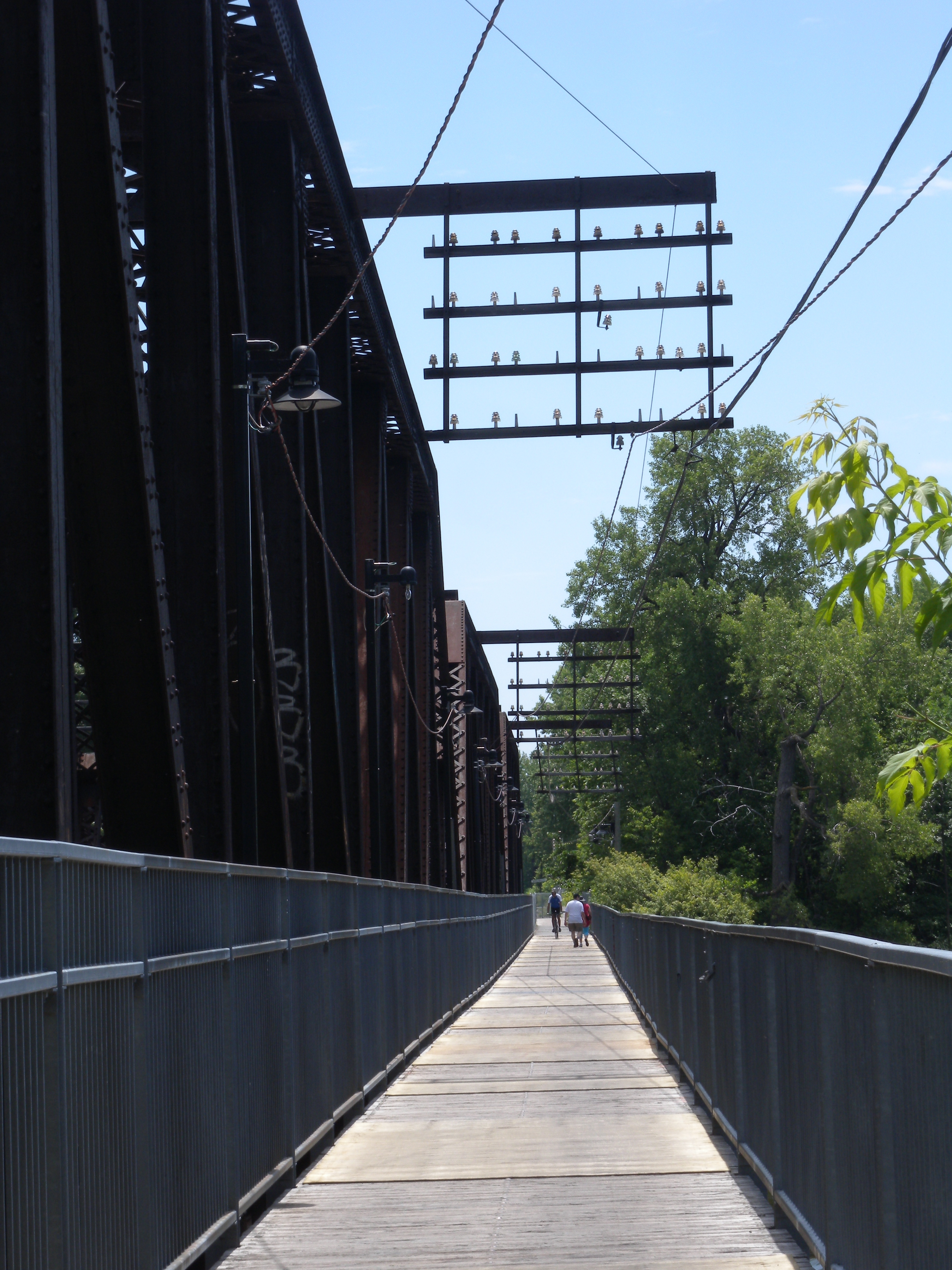
View, looking south, of the bicycle bridge attached to the Bordeaux Railway Bridge, France

A bicycle bridge is a bridge designed to be accessible to both bicycles and pedestrians or in some cases only to bicycles.

== See also ==
- Don Burnett Bicycle-Pedestrian Bridge
- Footpath
- Garden Bridge, London, England
- Hoogholtje bridge, Netherlands
- Pedestrian separation structure (overpass)
- Pedway
- Walkway and Canopy walkway
- Wildlife crossing
