= Mishima Skywalk =

Mishima Skywalk 三島スカイウォーク
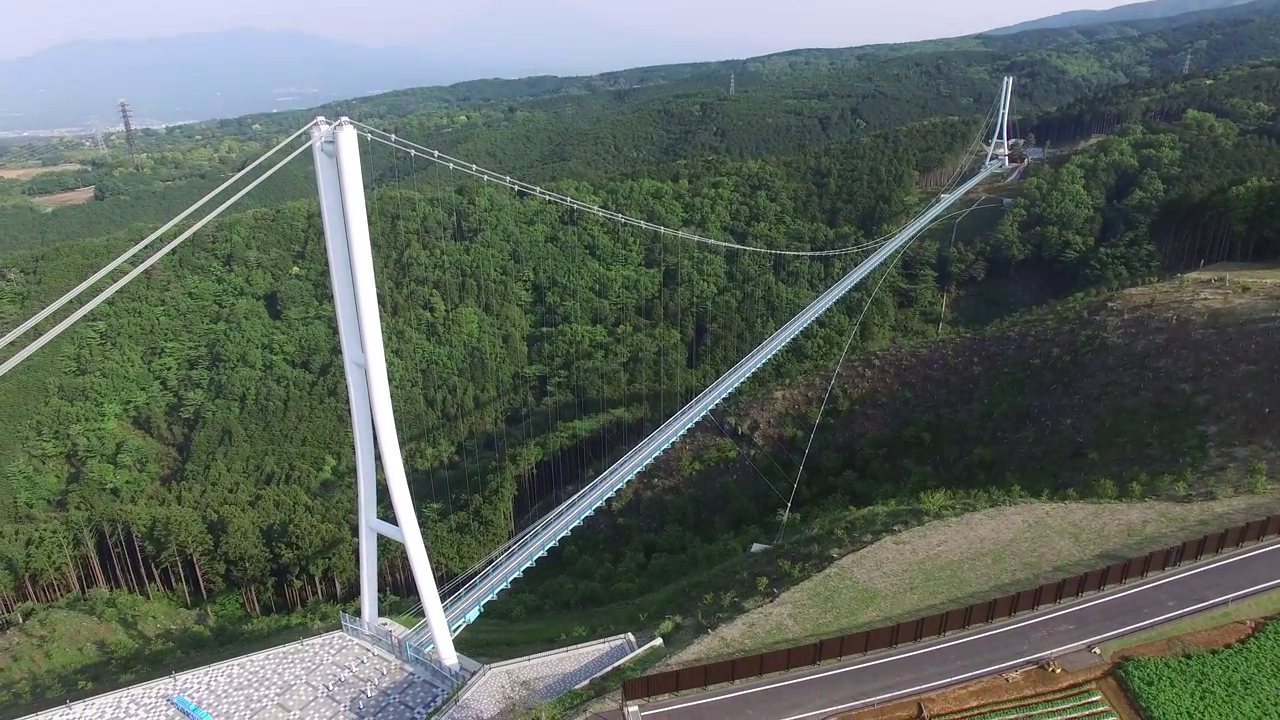
- Aerial view of the Mishima Skywalk in May 2016
- Coordinates: 35.151944°N 138.980556°E
- Carries: Pedestrian traffic
- Crosses: Mount Hakone
- Locale: Japan Mishima, Shizuoka
- Official name: Hakone Seiroku Mishima Suspension Bridge
- Owner: Fujiko Corporation
- Website: mishima-skywalk.jp

Characteristics
- Design: Suspension bridge
- Total length: 400 metres
- Width: 1.6 metres
- Height: 44 meters
- Longest span: 400 metres
- Clearance below: 70.6 meters at the maximum point

History
- Constructed by: Kawada Technologies, inc.
- Construction start: 2012
- Construction cost: 4 billion yen
- Opened: 14 December 2015

Statistics
- Toll: 1100 yen for adults, 500 for secondary school students, 200 for primary school students, younger than school age is free

Location
- Interactive map of Mishima Skywalk

Mishima Skywalk (三島スカイウォーク, Mishima Sukaiwooku) is a pedestrian bridge officially known as the Hakone Seiroku Mishima Suspension Bridge (箱根西麓・三島大吊橋, Hakone Seiroku・Mishima Ōtsuribashi) that spans a valley on the southwestern rim of the Mount Hakone caldera in Mishima, Shizuoka, Japan. The primary function of the bridge is to provide visitors with panoramic views of Mount Fuji and Suruga Bay. Measuring 400 metres (1,300 ft), it is the longest suspension footbridge in Japan, surpassing the 390 metres (1,280 ft) long Kokonoe Yume Suspension Bridge in Kokonoe, Ōita upon its completion in 2015.
