= Bridge over Foša in Trogir =

Bridge over Foša in Trogir Most preko Foše u Trogiru
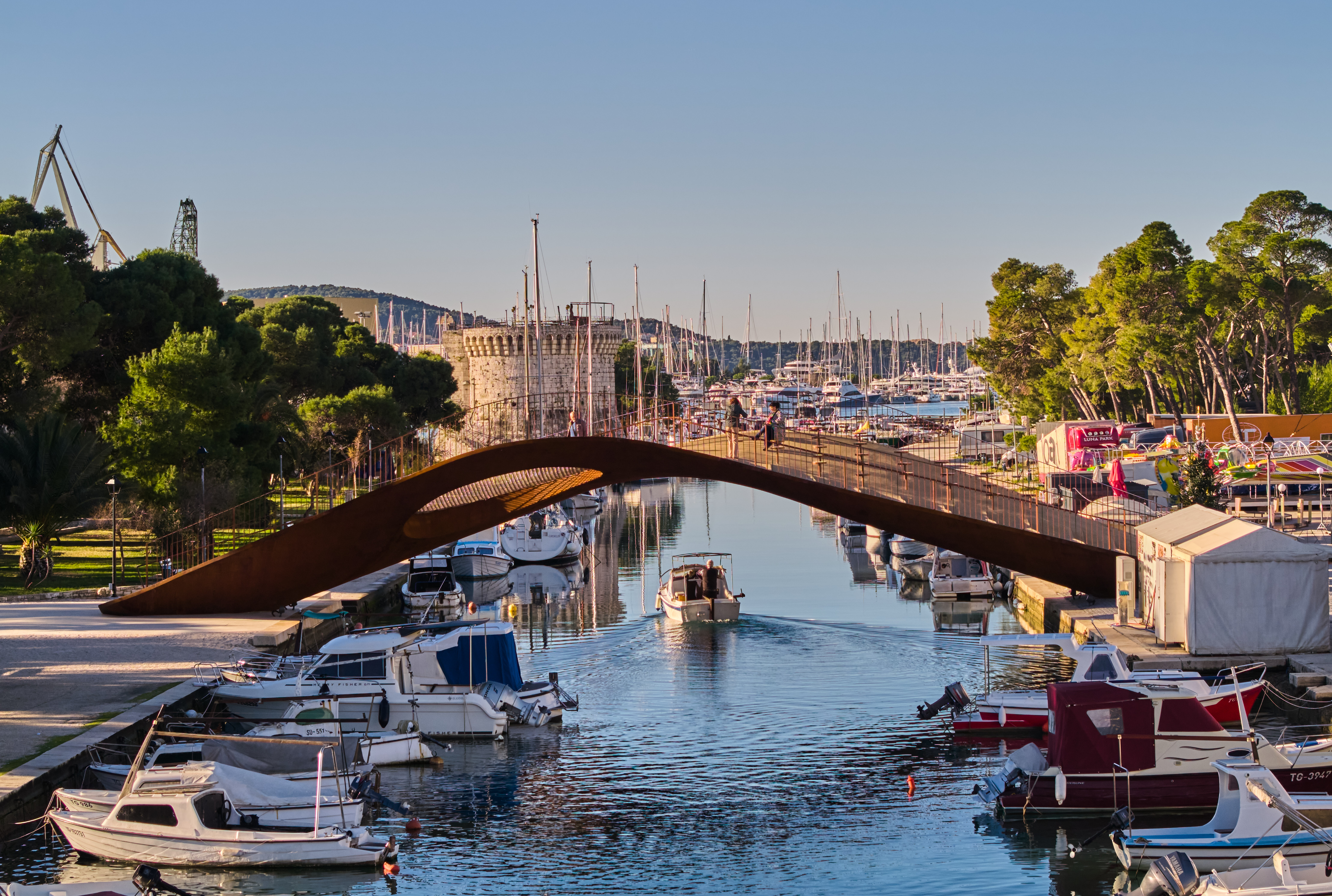
- Coordinates: 43°31′2″N 16°14′52″E
- Crosses: Foša Channel
- Locale: Trogir, Croatia

Characteristics
- Material: Rolled steel
- Total length: 31.80 m

History
- Architect: Luka Cvitan; Antonia Cvitan Vuletić

The Bridge over Foša is a pedestrian bridge in Trogir, Croatia, that connects the old town center with the coast across the narrow channel known as Foša. It was built as a replacement for a previous wooden bridge and represents a significant architectural contribution to the area.

The bridge is designed as a steel shell structure inspired by the shipbuilding heritage of Trogir, with an asymmetrical hyperbolic paraboloid shape that does not create a visual barrier within the UNESCO World Heritage Site. In addition to connecting the two sides of the canal, the bridge also serves as a social space, with stands and a perforated structure for pedestrian interaction and relaxation.

It was manufactured at the Vranjic shipyard and installed in one day. The construction cost was one million euros.

== History ==
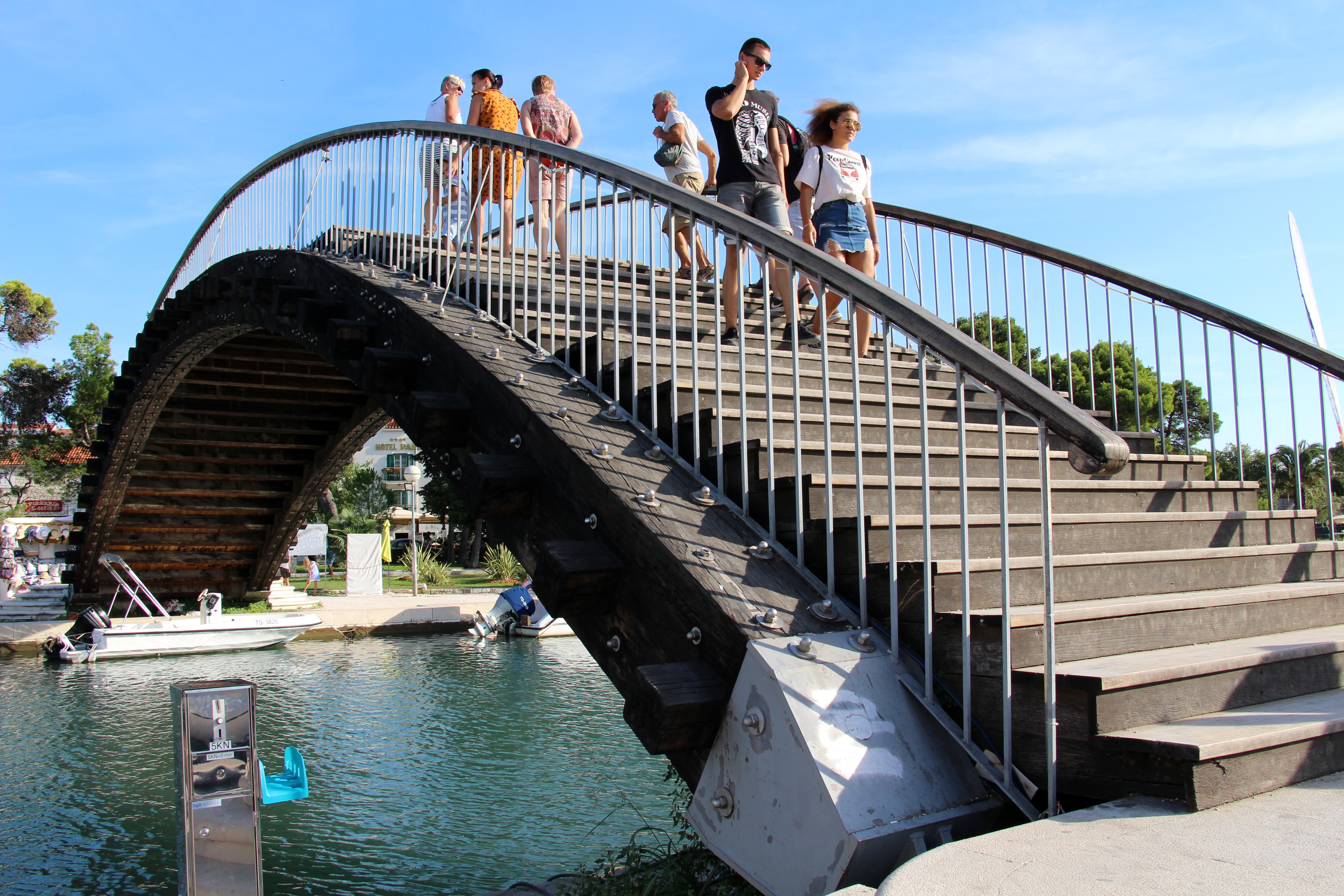
Former bridge over Foša

The former pedestrian bridge served as a link between the old city center and the coast across the narrow channel of Foša. It was installed in 2006 and was intended to be a temporary solution. Although functional, the wooden bridge became dilapidated over time, and its load-bearing capacity and durability no longer met the needs of pedestrian traffic. In addition, the wooden structure required frequent maintenance due to exposure to weather and seawater. The bridge was closed in November 2020.

The Split Architects Association announced an architectural and urban planning competition for a new bridge over the Foša River, which ran from February to April 2022. A total of 22 entries were submitted; on 22 July 2022, the jury, by a majority vote, awarded the first prize to the project of Luka Cvitan and Antonija Cvitan Vuletić from the company Prostorne taktike.

The competition was conducted in collaboration with the City of Trogir, with expert guidance and evaluation that included aspects of functionality, design and integration into the historical context of the city. The aim of the competition was to find a solution that would ensure a quality connection between the coast and the city center, while respecting the urban and cultural features of the UNESCO protected area.

== Design ==
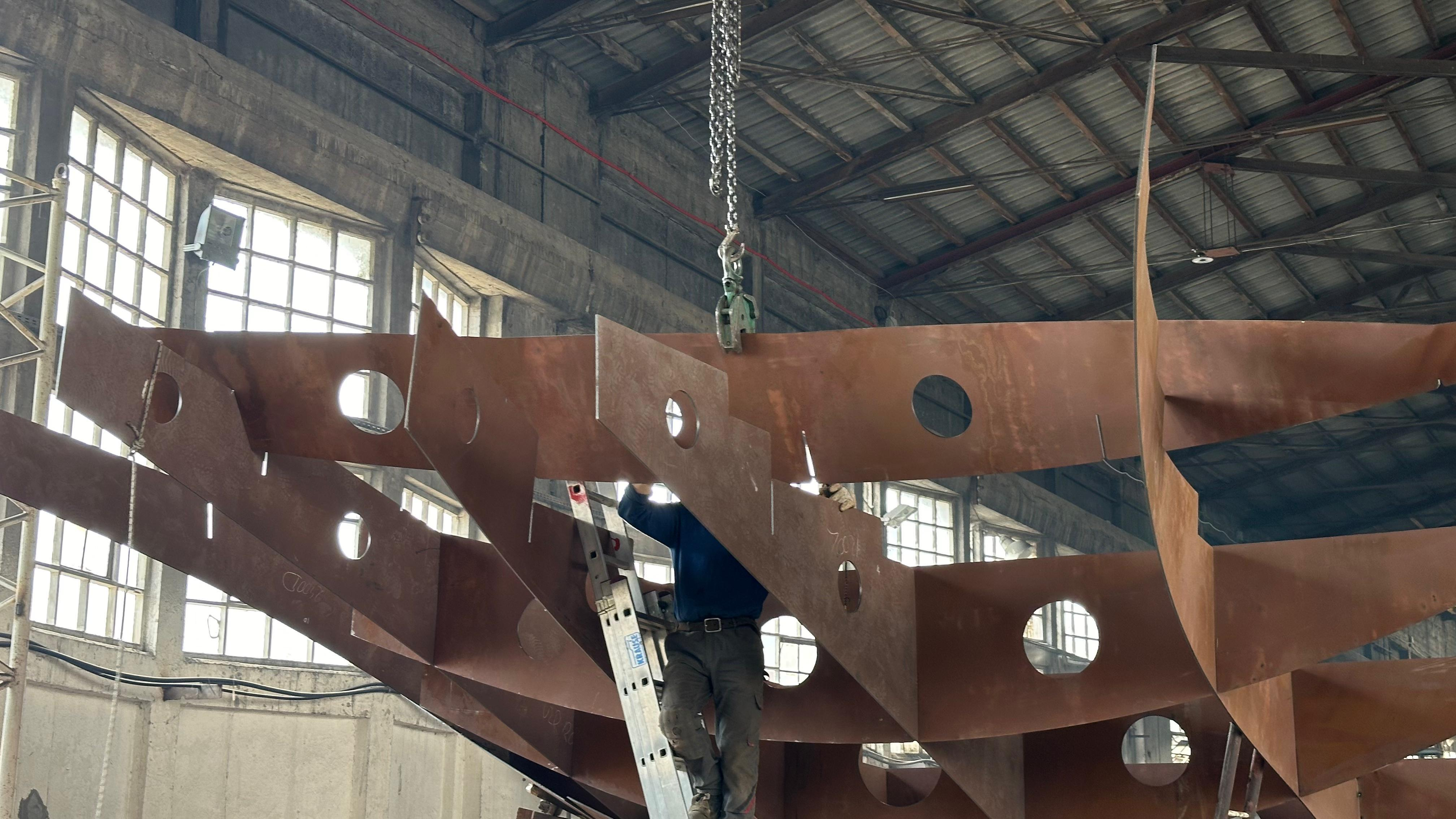
Early construction

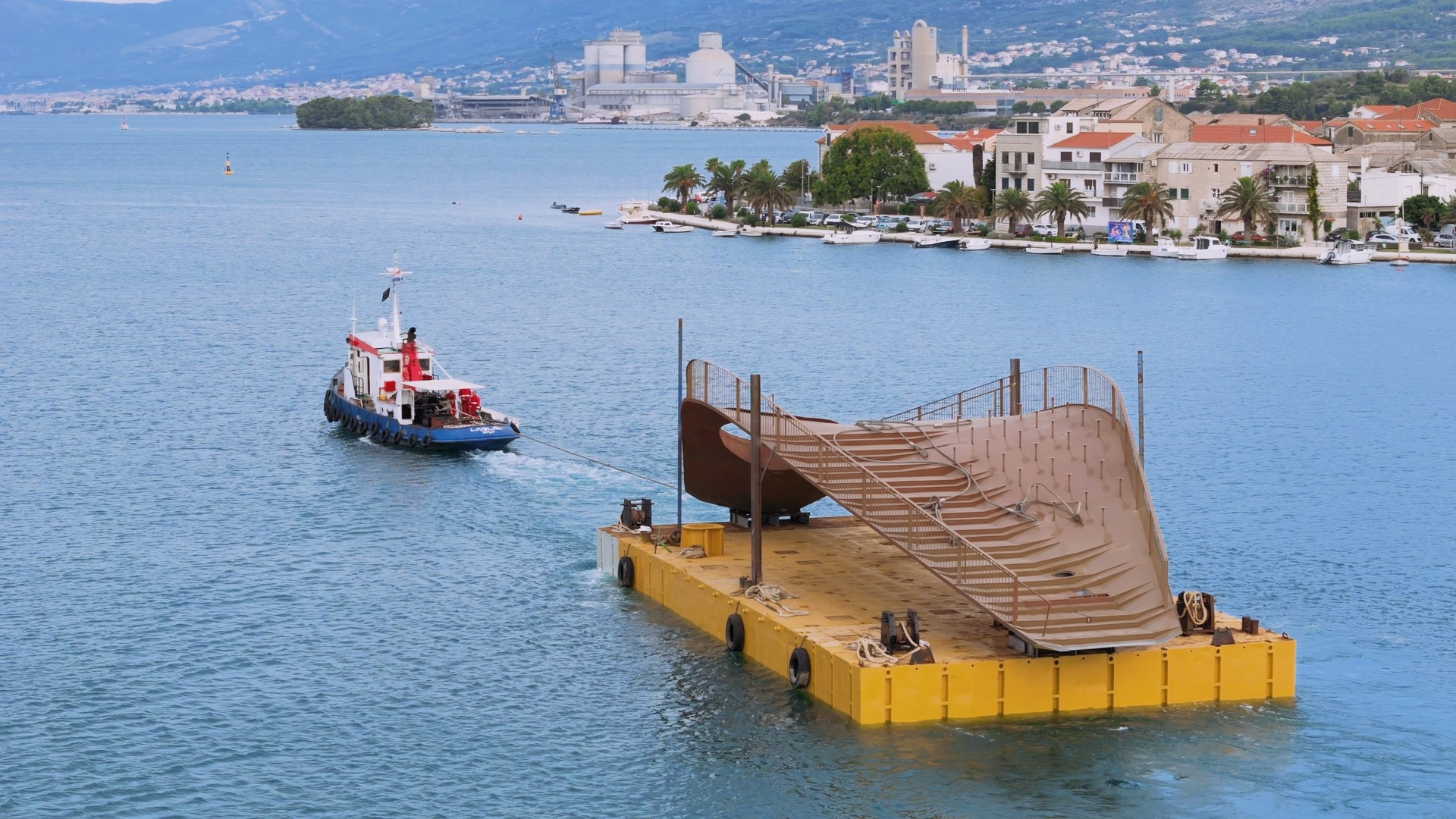
Transport from the shipyard

The bridge is designed as a steel shell structure of variable cross-section, shaped as an asymmetric hyperbolic paraboloid. According to the authors, the bridge refers to the rich shipbuilding tradition of Trogir.

The structural shell of the bridge consists of a cassette system of rolled steel, typical of ship structures. Visible parts of the bridge are coated with a three-component protective coating with metal powder that develops a rust patina over time, achieving an industrial aesthetic without compromising structural integrity.

The bridge's staircase is shaped along the line of the gentlest incline, with recycled rubber treads for added comfort and safety. Inside the staircase area, a combination of rubber and small stones provides a firm, stable surface, while outside the staircase, a soft rubber surface is used to facilitate movement. Stands are strategically placed on the steeper sections of the bridge. A perforated mesh structure creates space for sitting, lying and playing, emphasizing the bridge as a social gathering space.

== Exhibitions and awards ==
The bridge was presented at the 59th Zagreb Salon of Architecture and Urbanism.

In April 2025, the bridge was awarded the Medal for Contribution to the Culture of Construction by the jury of the Croatian Chamber of Architects.

== Gallery ==
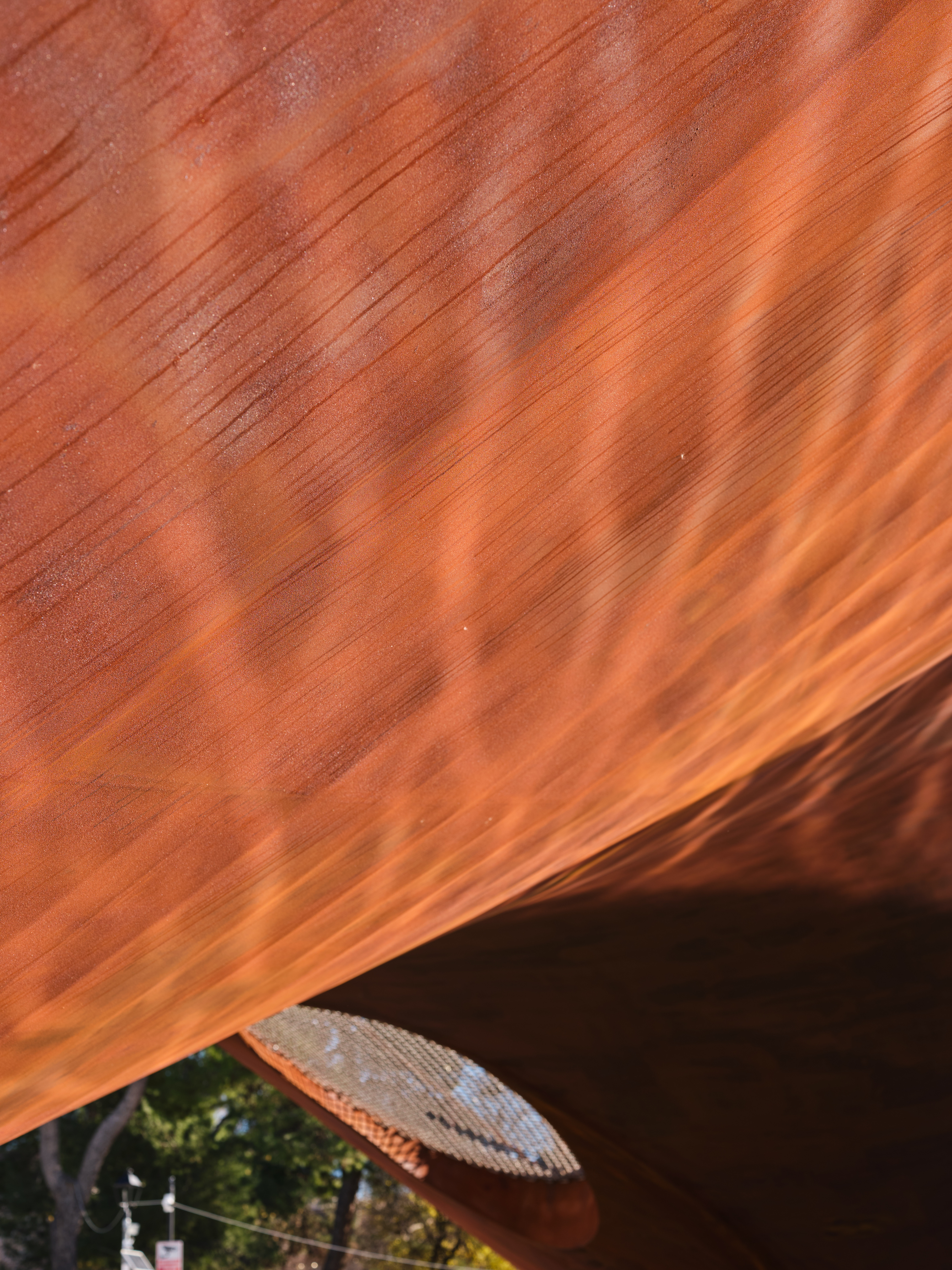
Paint detail

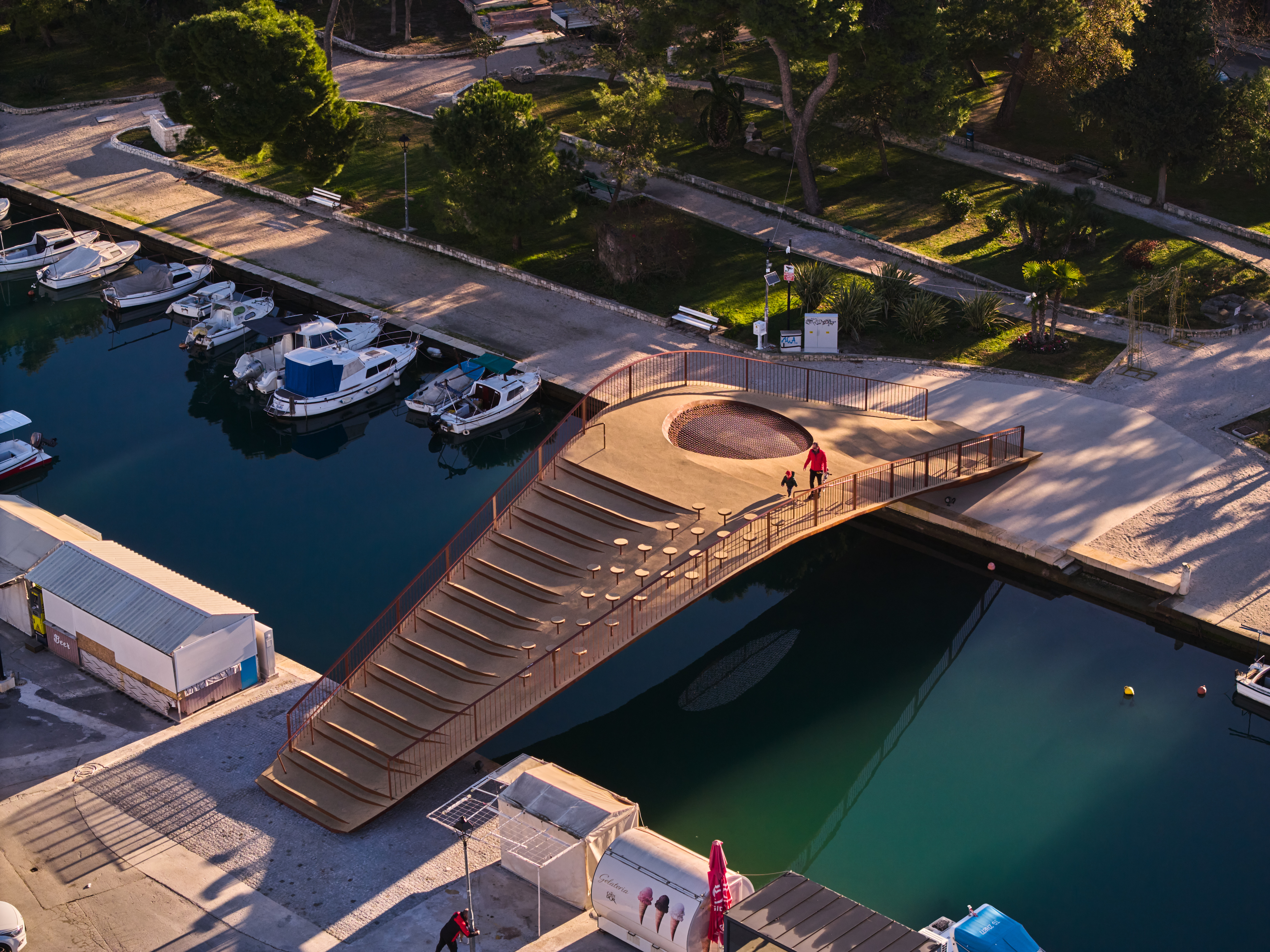
Aerial view

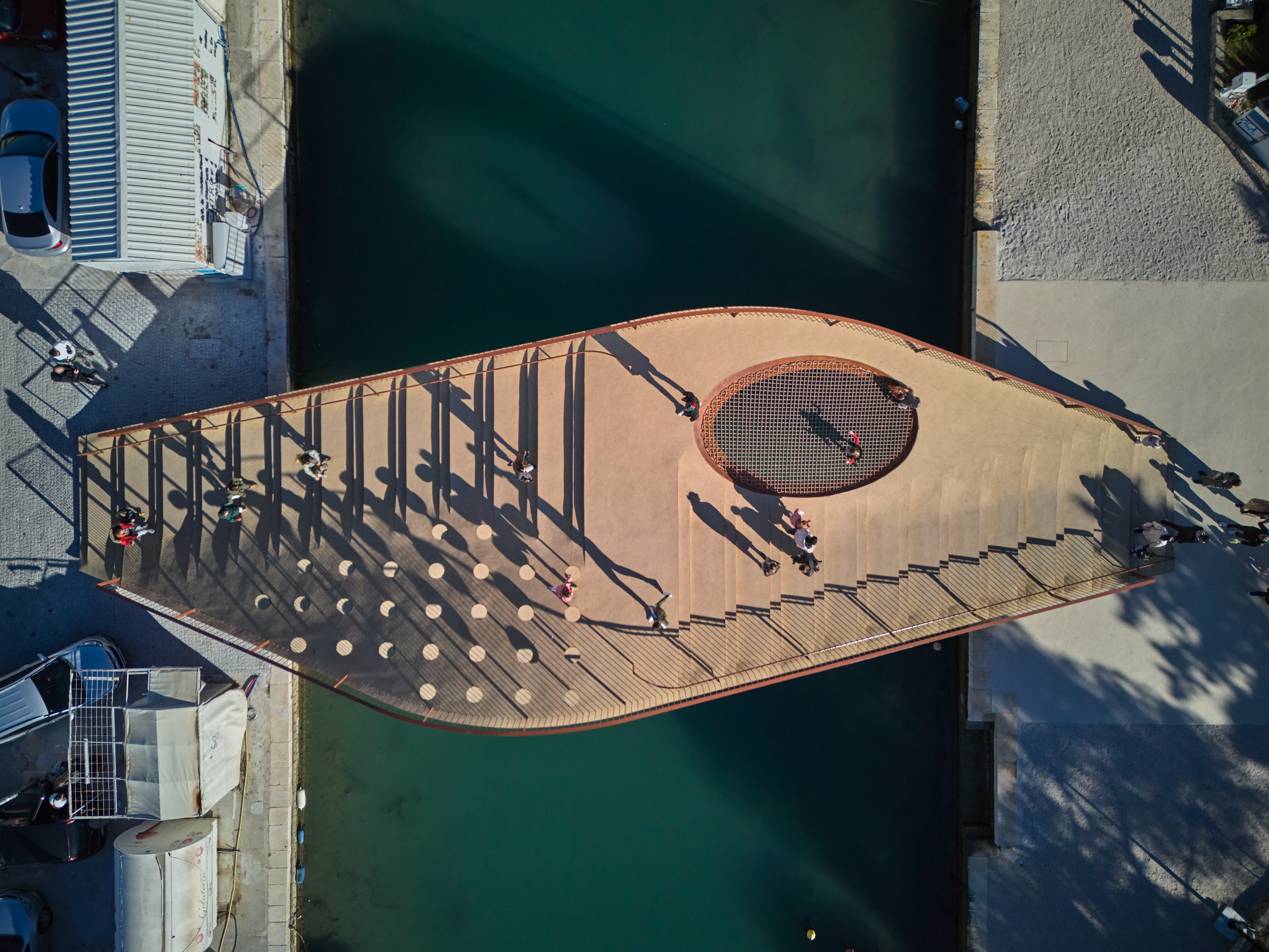
Aerial view

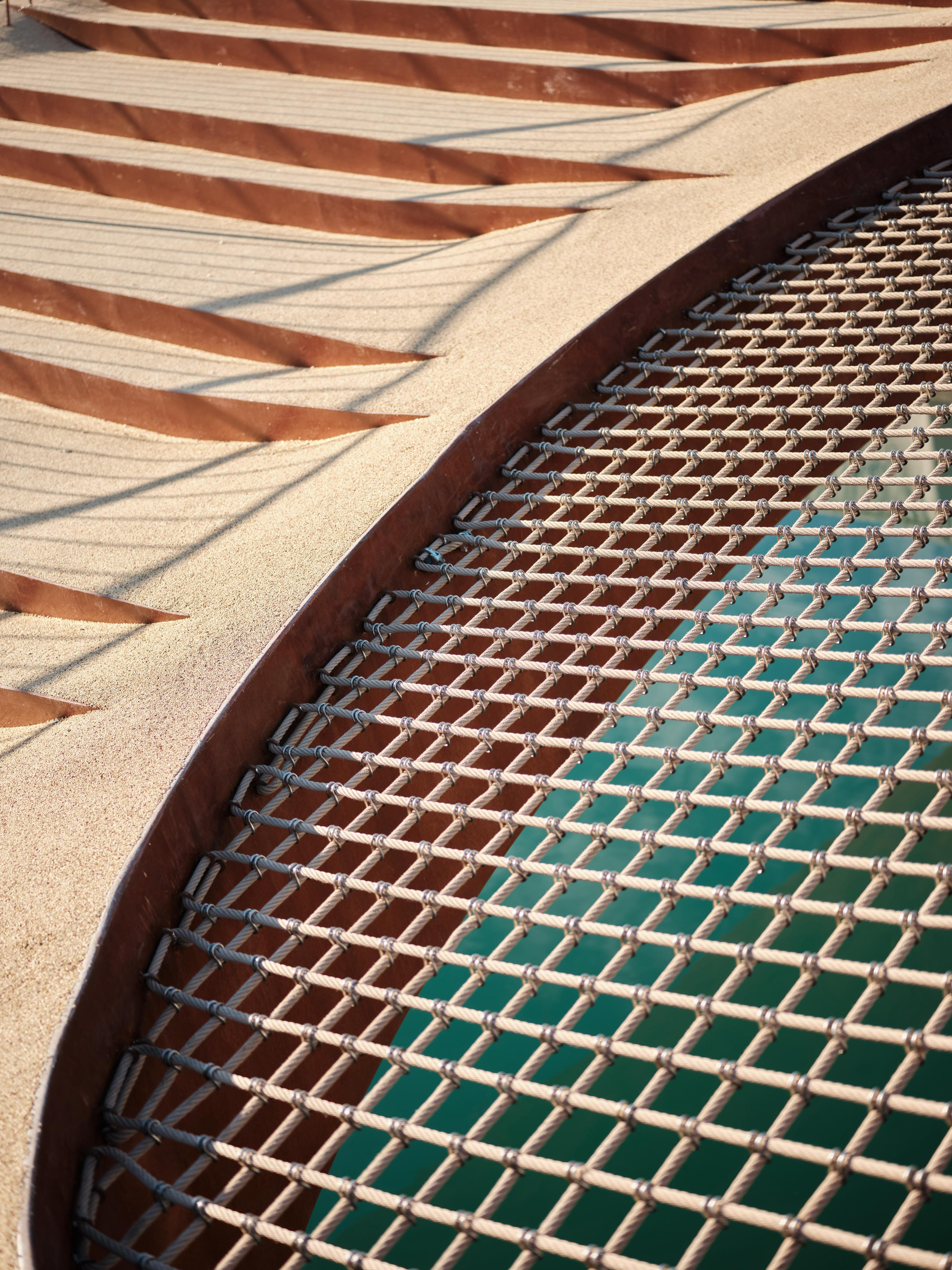
Details of the net and staircase
