= Big Dam Bridge =

Pulaski County Pedestrian and Bicycle Bridge
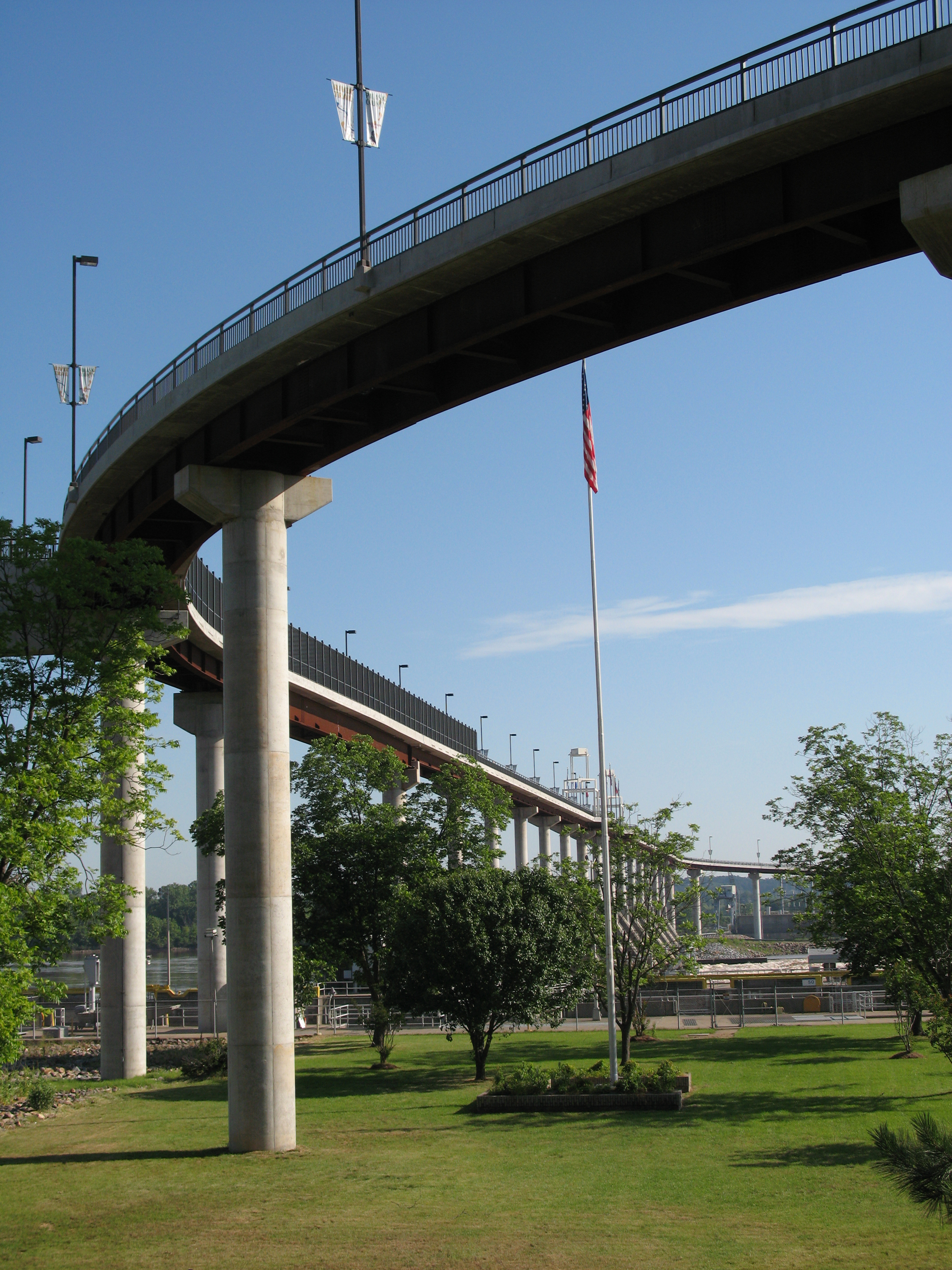
- The Big Dam Bridge as seen from the Arkansas River Trail in Little Rock
- Coordinates: 34°47′38″N 92°21′29″W
- Carries: Pedestrians and bicycles
- Crosses: Arkansas River
- Locale: Little Rock, Arkansas; North Little Rock, Arkansas
- Official name: Pulaski County Pedestrian and Bicycle Bridge
- Other name: Big Dam Bridge

Characteristics
- Total length: 4,226 feet (1,288 m)
- Width: 14 feet (4 m)

History
- Opened: September 30, 2006

Location
- Interactive map of Pulaski County Pedestrian and Bicycle Bridge

Originally intended to be called Murray Bridge, the Big Dam Bridge in Arkansas spans the Arkansas River and Murray Lock and Dam between Little Rock and North Little Rock and is open only to pedestrian and bicycle traffic. At 4,226 feet (1288 m) in length it is the longest pedestrian/bicycle bridge in North America that has never been used by trains or motor vehicles. It rises to 90 feet (27 m) over the Arkansas River and 30 feet (9.1 m) over the dam. The span over the river is 3,463 feet (1055 m), with the ramps on either side of the river accounting for the rest of the length. The southern end of the bridge is near Little Rock's Murray Park, while the northern end is at Cook's Landing Park in North Little Rock.

The nickname was given by Pulaski County Judge F.G. “Buddy” Villines, who was concerned about the financing needed and was quoted to say, "We're going to build that dam bridge." (He insisted he was referring to its location on a dam, and was not using the mild expletive.) The construction cost was $12.8 million.

The opening ceremony was held on Saturday, September 30, 2006. Local politicians boasted that the bridge will boost the local economy and contribute to the health of the population. The bridge and adjacent parks are used for several races including the Big Dam Bridge 100 cycling tour, the BDB Twilight 5k race, and the BDB Duathlon.

The Federal Highway Administration gave one of its first Exemplary Human Environment Initiative awards to the bridge, and Illuminating Engineer Society gave its Award of Merit at the international level to the bridge's LED lighting design.

== Gallery ==
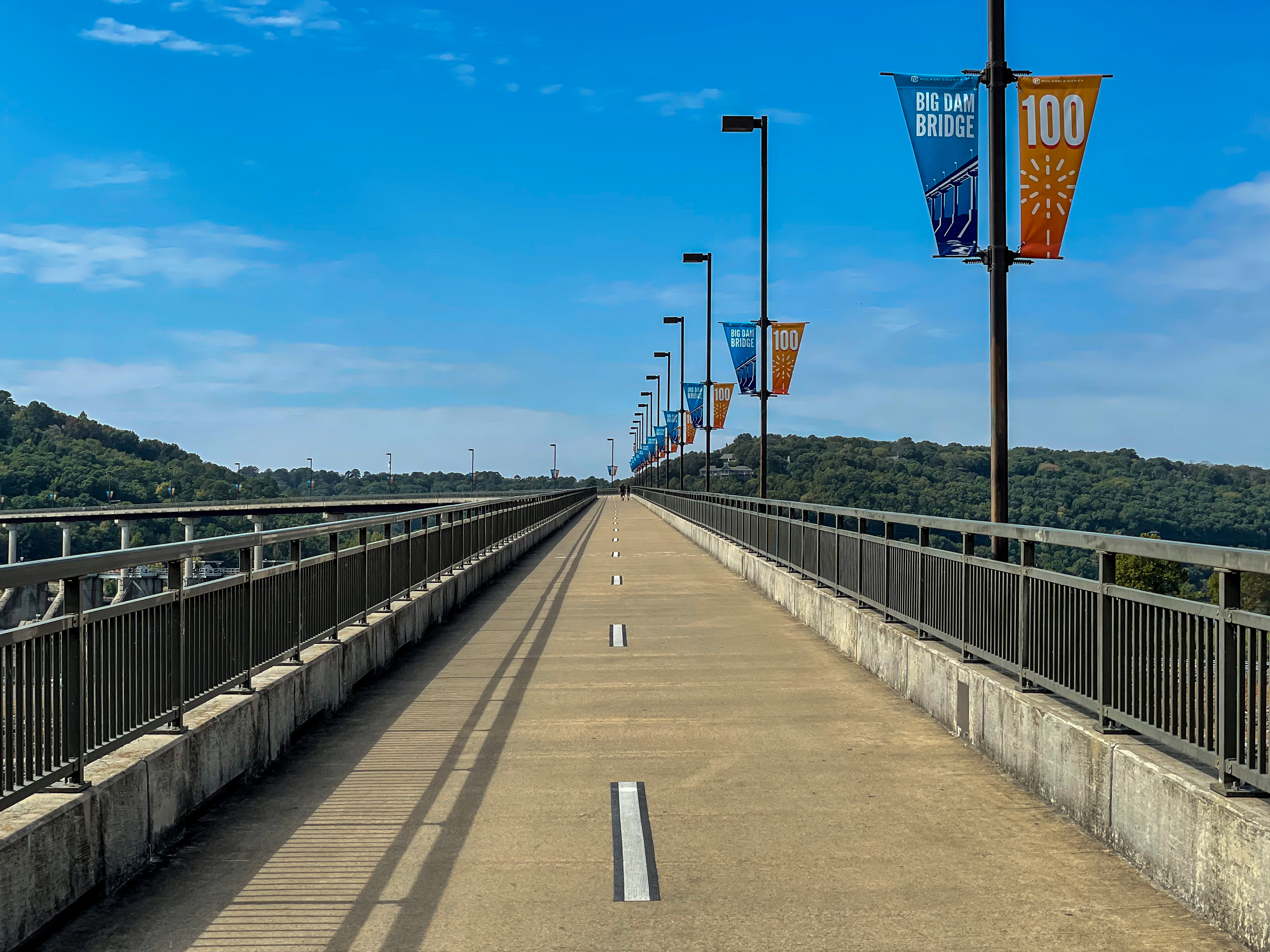
View from on the bridge

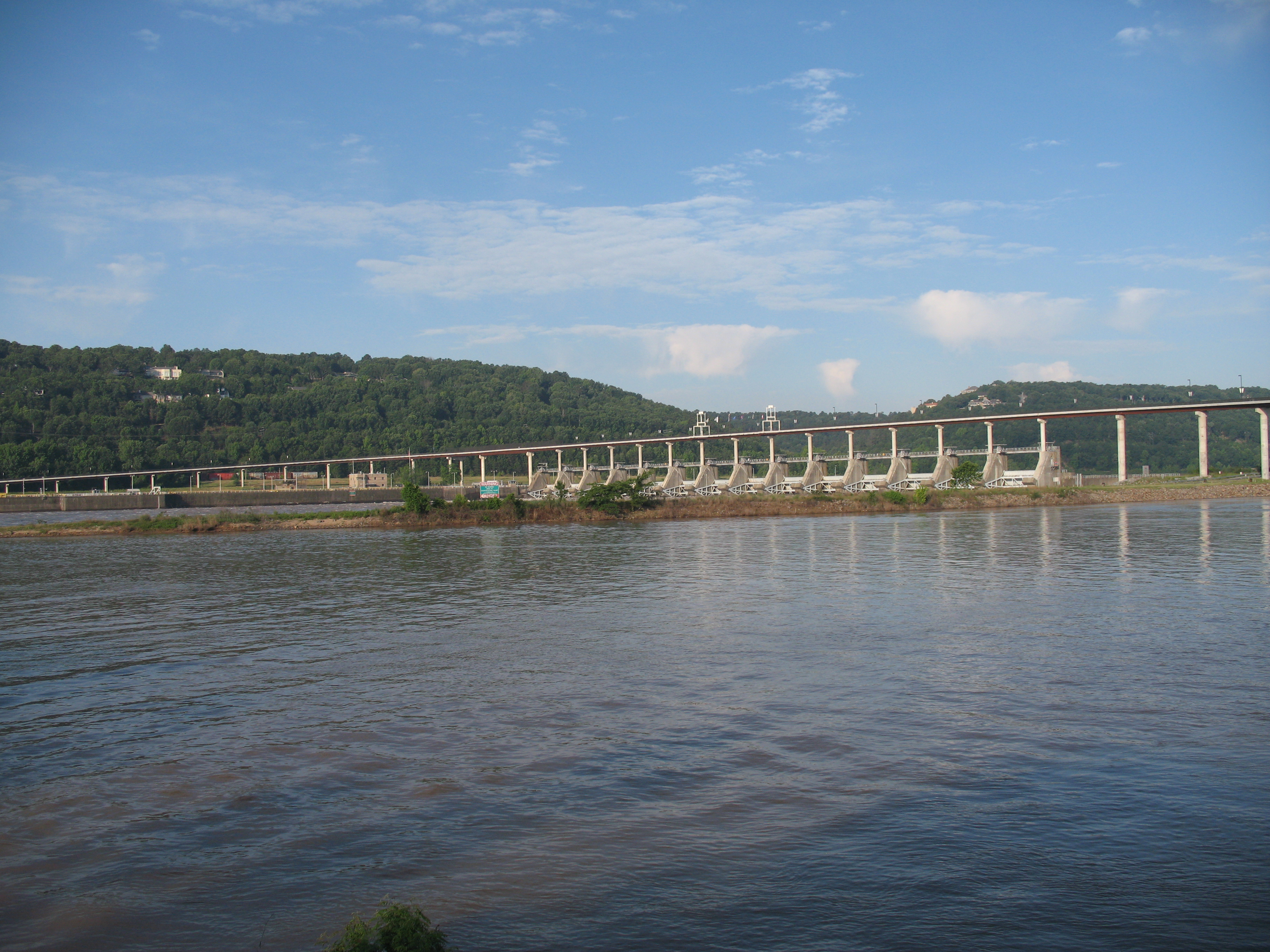
View from North Little Rock

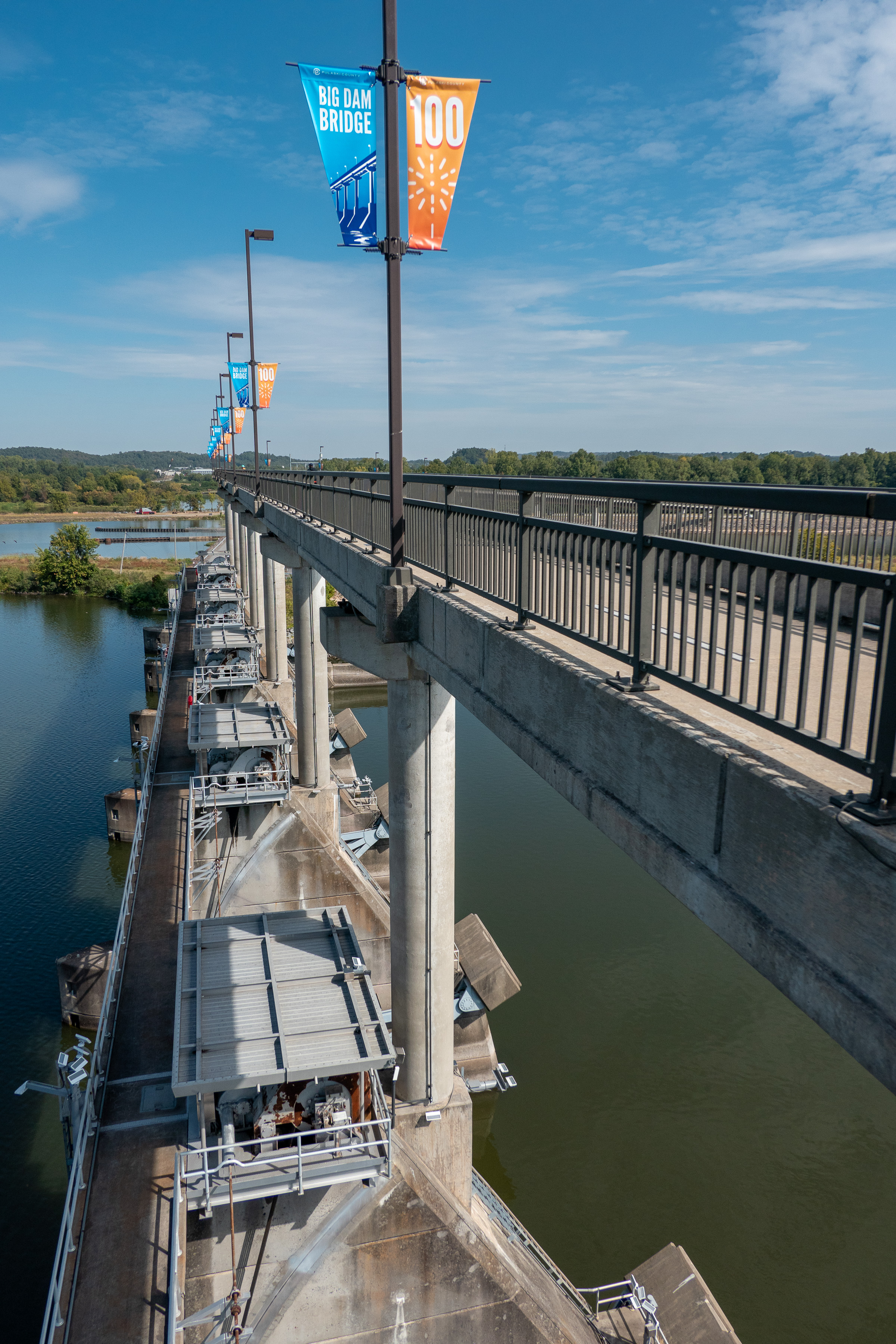
Looking down from the west side of the bridge
