= Rumyantsev Obelisk =

Monument in Saint Petersburg

- Румянцевский обелиск
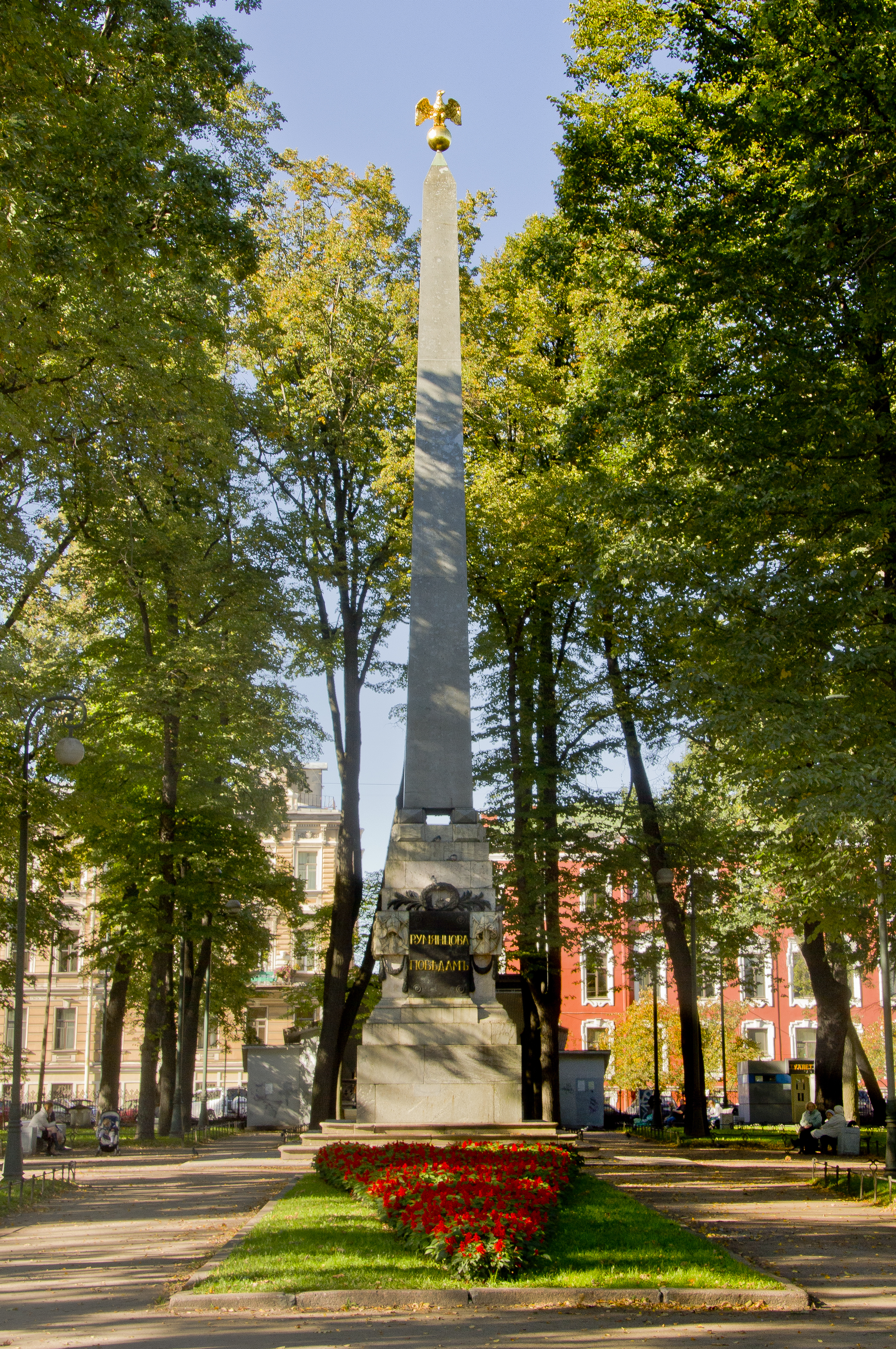
- Rumyantsev Obelisk, Rumyantsev Square
- Interactive map of Rumyantsev Obelisk
- Location: Saint Petersburg
- Coordinates: 59°56′18″N 30°17′33″E
- Designer: Vincenzo Brenna
- Type: Obelisk
- Material: Serdobolsky granite (obelisk and base); Pink Tivdia and Gray Raskolsky marble (pedestal); White Italian marble (bas-reliefs)
- Height: 21.3 metres (70 ft)
- Beginning date: 1798
- Completion date: 1799
- Opening date: 1799
- Dedicated to: Pyotr Rumyantsev

The Rumyantsev Obelisk (Russian: Румянцевский обелиск) is a granite obelisk located in Saint Petersburg. It is at the centre of Rumyantsev Square, on Vasilyevsky Island, between the Menshikov Palace and the Saint Petersburg Institute for Painting, Sculpture and Architecture. The obelisk commemorates the victories of Count Pyotr Rumyantsev during the Russo-Turkish War between 1768 and 1774, and his service in the Russo-Turkish War of 1787–1792.

The idea for a monument originated late in the reign of Empress Catherine the Great, and was realised by her son and successor, Emperor Paul I, in 1799. Paul had attempted to persuade Rumyantsev's heirs to accept the offer of a palace built at public expense in place of the monument, but was turned down. The monument was built to the design of Vincenzo Brenna and was initially sited on the Tsaritsyn Meadow, later the Field of Mars. It was moved twice over its existence, to a new site on the Tsaritsyn Meadow after the Suvorov Monument was unveiled there, and then to Vasilyevsky Island after 1818, where it remains. The square it sits on was landscaped with gardens after 1867, and after a period being renamed after Taras Shevchenko during the Soviet era, had its original name, Rumyantsev Square, restored in 2001.

== Conception ==
The concept for a monument to honour Rumyantsev's victories originated in 1795, towards the end of the reign of Empress Catherine the Great. Both the Empress and Rumyantsev died in 1796, though Rumyantsev's sons continued to press for the realisation of the monument. Catherine's successor, Emperor Paul I, tried to convince them to accept an offer of having a palace constructed at public expense instead, but they refused. Paul finally granted the request in February 1798, decreeing the construction of an obelisk "to commemorate the victories of Field Marshal Rumyantsev-Zadunaisky, which is to be sited on the square between the Summer Garden and the Lombard, and orders the amount of 82,441 rubles to be placed at the disposal of our official Marshal Tiesenhausen, to be available at his request." Architect Vincenzo Brenna was commissioned to design the monument.

== Design and construction ==
The monument was assembled over several months and installed on the Tsaritsyn Meadow in early 1799. As completed the monument stands 21.3 metres (70 ft) high, with the obelisk and base made of Serdobolsky granite, and the pedestal constructed from pink Tivdia and gray Raskolsky marble. The friezes and bas-reliefs are of white Italian marble, displaying military trophies and garlands of dark bronze. The obelisk is topped with a gilded ball surmounted by an eagle spreading its wings. The front of the pedestal displays a black marble plaque with the gilt inscription "Rumyantsev's victories" (Russian: Румянцова побѣдамъ). Initially sited towards the south of the meadow, close to the Moyka River, the obelisk was moved towards the northern end, closer to the Marble Palace and the River Neva, when Mikhail Kozlovsky's Suvorov Monument was erected nearby in 1801.

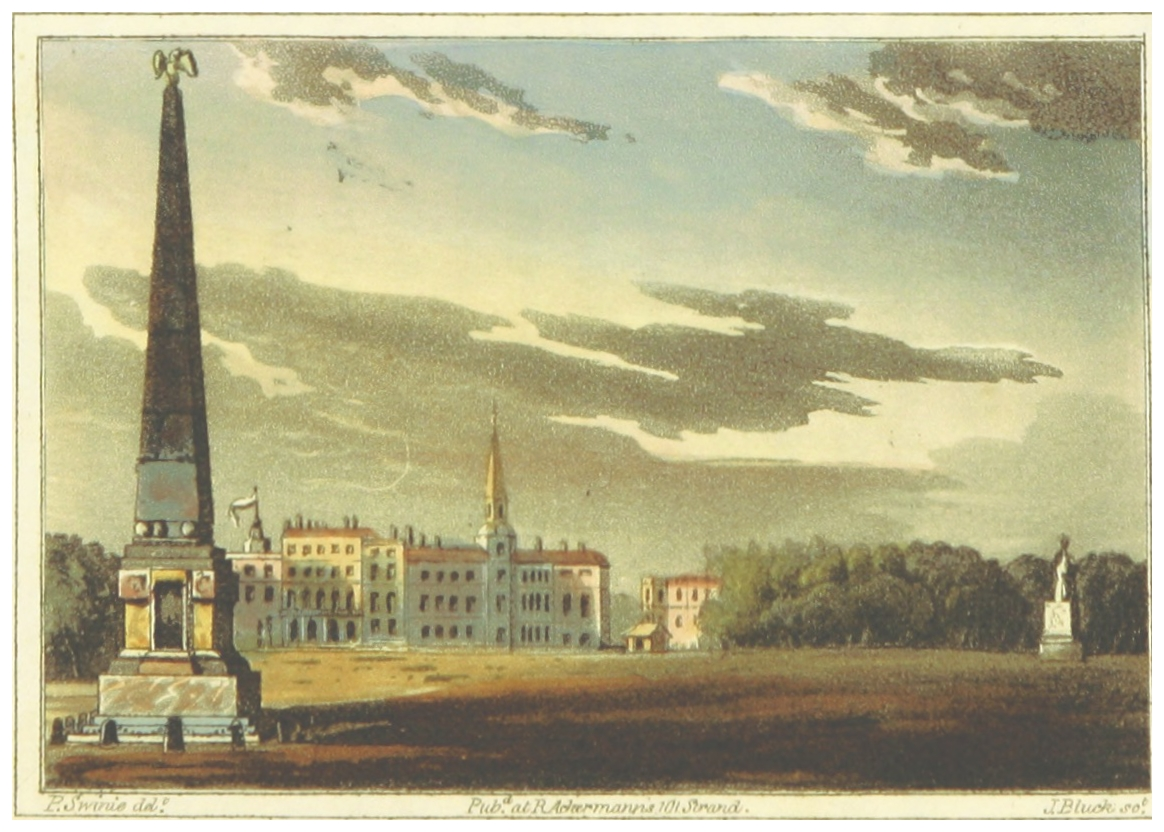
The monument on the Field of Mars in 1814. In the background to the right is the Suvorov Monument. Both were relocated in 1818.

The monument was moved again in 1818, as part of architect Carlo Rossi's redevelopment of the meadow, by now named the Field of Mars. With the approval of Emperor Alexander I it was installed on Vasilyevsky Island, on the parade ground between the Imperial Academy of Arts and the Menshikov Palace, home of the First Cadet Corps, where Rumyantsev himself had studied. In siting it in its new location Rossi placed the obelisk on a granite stepped stylobate. During its early years the monument suffered from damage, and the theft of some of its bronze ornaments. In 1809 Andrey Voronikhin restored the monument, with the missing parts being re-cast by Vasily Ekimov.

== Later developments ==
The setting of the monument was developed between 1866 and 1867 with the laying out of gardens on the square at the expense of city merchant S. F. Solovyov and to the design of Nikolai Kovrigin. The square was again redeveloped by Rudolf Katzer in 1927, and on 22 February 1939 it was renamed Shevchenko Square, commemorating poet Taras Shevchenko, who had lived and worked at the Academy of Arts. Its original name of Rumyantsev Square was restored on 21 May 2001.
