= Hakimi =

Hakimi may refer to:

- Hakimi (surname), list of people with the surname
- Hakimi, Tajikistan, a village in Nurobod District, Tajikistan

== See also ==
- Hakim
