= Akim (disambiguation) =

An akim is a mayor or governor in Kazakhstan or Kyrgyzstan.

Akim may also refer to:

- Akim (name)
- Akim (film) (2019), a Kazakh comedy film
- Akim (comics), an adventure comics series published between 1950 and 1983
- Angkatan Keadilan Insan Malaysia (AKIM), a Malaysian political party

== See also ==
- Achim (disambiguation)
- Akeem
- Akim Oda, a town in Ghana's Eastern Region
- Hakim (disambiguation)
