= Ekimov =

Ekimov, also romanized as Yekimov, feminine: Ekimova/Yekimova is a surname. Notable people with the surname include:

- Alexey Ekimov (born 1945), Russian physicist
- Dmitri Ekimov (born 1971), Belarusian-Russian footballer
- Leonid Yekimov (born 1987), Russian sport shooter
- Marfa Ekimova, Russian-born British rhythmic gymnast
- Vasily Ekimov (1756/1758–1837), Russian sculptor
- Viatcheslav Ekimov (born 1966), Russian cyclist

== See also ==
- Yakimov (disambiguation)
- Akimov
