= Akim (name) =

Akim is a given name, a variant of Akeem, Hakeem, or Hakim. Notable people with the name include:

- Akim Aliu (born 1989), Nigerian-born Canadian-Ukrainian professional ice hockey player
- Akim Galimov (born 1985), Ukrainian journalist, screenwriter, and producer
- Akim Isker, French film director and actor
- Akim Monet, Swiss-born American photographer
- Akim Sairinen (born 1994), Finnish footballer
- Akim Souab, the main character of French cartoon Wheel Squad
- Akim Tamiroff (1899–1972), Armenian-American actor
