= Hakim (name) =

- Pronunciation: Arabic: [ħakiːm] (حكيم); Arabic: [ħaːkɪm] (حاکم)
- Gender: Male
- Language: Arabic

Origin
- Meaning: wise (حكيم) ruler (حاکم)
- Region of origin: Arabia

Other names
- Alternative spelling: Hakeem, Hakiem, Hakime; Hakem, Hakam
- Variant form: Akeem
- Related names: Joachim

Hakim or Al-Hakim is a masculine given name from Arabic: حكيم ḥakīm "wise" or Arabic: حاکم ḥākem "ruler". Its Anglicized variant, especially in the United States, is Hakeem.

== Title ==
- Samir Geagea, known as al-Hakim, leader of the Lebanese Forces party
- George Habash, known as al-Hakim, founder of the Popular Front for the Liberation of Palestine

== Honorific ==
- Hakim Noor-ud-Din
- Hakim Abdul Aziz
- Hakim Habibur Rahman
- Hakim Mohammed Said
- Hakim Syed Karam Husain
- Hakim Syed Zillur Rahman

== Patronymic ==
- Abu Abdullah al-Hakim Nishapuri (933–1012), Sunni scholar and traditionist of Khorasan
- Abdel-Aziz al-Hakim (1953–2009), Iraqi cleric and politician
- Sulayman ibn al-Hakam (died 1016), Umayyad ruler of Córdoba
- Tawfiq al-Hakim (1898–1987), Egyptian dramatist, novelist and thinker

== Given name ==
- Al-Hakim al-Tirmidhi (c. 755 – 869), Sunni jurist and traditionist of Khorasan
- Al-Hakim bi-Amr Allah (985–1021), Fatimid caliph (r. 996–1021)
- Hakim (Egyptian singer) (born 1962), Egyptian sha'abi singer
- Al-Hakam I (died 822), Emir of Córdoba
- Al-Hakam II (915–976), Ruler of Córdoba
- Hakeem Adeniji (born 1997), American football player
- Hakim Adi (living), British historian and scholar
- Al-Hakam ibn Abi al-'As (c. 600), father of Umayyad caliph Marwan I and uncle of Uthman ibn Affan
- Hakim Bey, pseudonym of Peter Lamborn Wilson (1945–2022), American writer
- Abdul Hakim Sani Brown (born 1999), Japanese sprinter
- Hakim ibn Hizam (fl. 600s), Meccan merchant
- Hakeem Jeffries (born 1970), American Congressman
- Hakeem Nicks, (born 1988), American football player
- Hakeem Noor-ud-Din (c. 1841 – 1914), Ahmadiyya leader and companion of Mirza Ghulam Ahmad
- Hakeem Femi Gbajabiamila (born 1962), Nigerian politician
- Hakeem Olajuwon (born 1963), Nigerian-American retired basketball player
- Hakim Rawther (died 2013), Indian director and actor of Malayalam films
- Hakeem Seriki (born 1979), American rapper better known as Chamillionaire
- Hakim Toumi (born 1961), Algerian retired hammer thrower
- Hakim Abol Qasim Ferdowsi Tusi (940–1020), Persian poet and author of the epic Shahnameh better known as Ferdowsi
- Hakeem Valles, (born 1992), American football player
- Hakim Warrick (born 1982), American basketball player
- Hakim Ali Zardari (1930–2011), Pakistani tribal leader and father of former President Asif Ali Zardari
- Hakim Ziyech (born 1993), Moroccan-Dutch footballer

== Family name ==
- Abdo Hakim (born 1973), Lebanese actor and voice actor
- Ayala Hakim, director of the technology division of Mizrahi-Tefahot Bank, Israel, previously Brigadier-general of the Israeli Defence Forces
- Az-Zahir Hakim (born 1977), American football coach and former player, older brother of Saalim Hakim
- André Hakim (1915–1980), Egyptian-born film producer for 20th Century Fox, brother of Robert and Raymond Hakim
- Christine Hakim (born 1956), Indonesian actress, film producer, activist
- Imani Hakim (born 1993), American actress
- James Gita Hakim (1954–2021), South Sudanese-Ugandan internist, clinical epidemiologist, cardiologist, researcher
- Maximos II Hakim (c. 1689 – 1761), patriarch of the Melkite Greek Catholic Church from 1760 to 1761
- Maximos V Hakim (1908–2001), patriarch of the Melkite Greek Catholic Church from 1967 to 2000
- Nadey Hakim (born 1958), British surgeon
- Nasser Hakim (born 1960), Lebanese-born Curaçaoan businessman and politician
- Noel Hakim (born 1972), Franco-Lebanese Banker
- Naji Hakim (born 1955), the Lebanese-born composer and organist at the Église de la Sainte-Trinité, Paris
- Omar Hakim (born 1959), American drummer
- Peter Hakim, American economist of Lebanese descent
- Robert and Raymond Hakim (1907–1992) and (1909–1980), Egyptian-born, European film producers, brothers of André Hakim
- Saalim Hakim (born 1990), American football player, younger brother of Az-Zahir Hakim
- Weli-Ahmed Hakim, Finnish Tatar Imam
- Yalda Hakim, Australian journalist
- Hakim family of Iraqi Shiite clerics:
  - Muhsin al-Hakim (1889–1970), the spiritual leader of the Shia world between 1955 and 1970
  - Muhammad Saeed al-Hakim (born 1936), Shiite cleric
  - Mohammad Baqir al-Hakim (1939–2003), Shiite cleric
  - Abdul Aziz al-Hakim (1953–2009), Shiite cleric and politician
  - Ammar al-Hakim (born 1971), Shiite cleric and politician

== Fictional characters ==
- Doctor Hakim, a character in the 2021 video game It Takes Two

== See also ==
- Akim (disambiguation)
- Hakim (disambiguation)
- Al-Hakam (disambiguation)
