= Suvorov Square =

Suvorov Monument may refer to:

- Suvorov Square (Moscow)
- Suvorov Square (Saint Petersburg)
- Suvorov Square (Tiraspol)
