= Yakimov =

Yakimov or Yakimova (the feminine form of the surname) may refer to:

== People ==
- Aleksandar Yakimov (b. 1989), Bulgarian footballer (soccer player)
- Anastasiya Yakimova, Belarusian tennis player
- Andrey Yakimov (b. 1989), Belarusian footballer
- Anna Yakimova, Russian revolutionary
- Bogdan Yakimov, Russian ice hockey player
- Dimitar Yakimov (b. 1941), Bulgarian footballer
- Vyacheslav Yakimov, Russian footballer
- Yuriy Yakimov (b. 1953), Soviet and Russian rower

== Places ==
- Yakimov, Kursk Oblast, a khutor in Konyshyovsky District, Kursk Oblast (Russia)

== See also ==
- Yekimov
- Akimov
