= Achim (disambiguation) =

Achim may refer to:

== People ==
- Achim, descendant of David
- Achim (name), a short form for German given name Joachim and a Romanian surname

== Places ==
- Achim, also Achim bei Bremen, a town in the district of Verden, Lower Saxony, Germany
- Achim, Wolfenbüttel, a village in the district of Wolfenbüttel, Lower Saxony, Germany
- Achim District, a former kreis (district) of the Prussian Province of Hanover from 1885 to 1932

== See also ==
- Achim-Verden Geest, a nature preserve in Lower Saxony, Germany
- Akim (disambiguation)
- Hakim (disambiguation)
