= Suvorov Monument (Saint Petersburg) =

Monument in Saint Petersburg

- Памятник Суворову
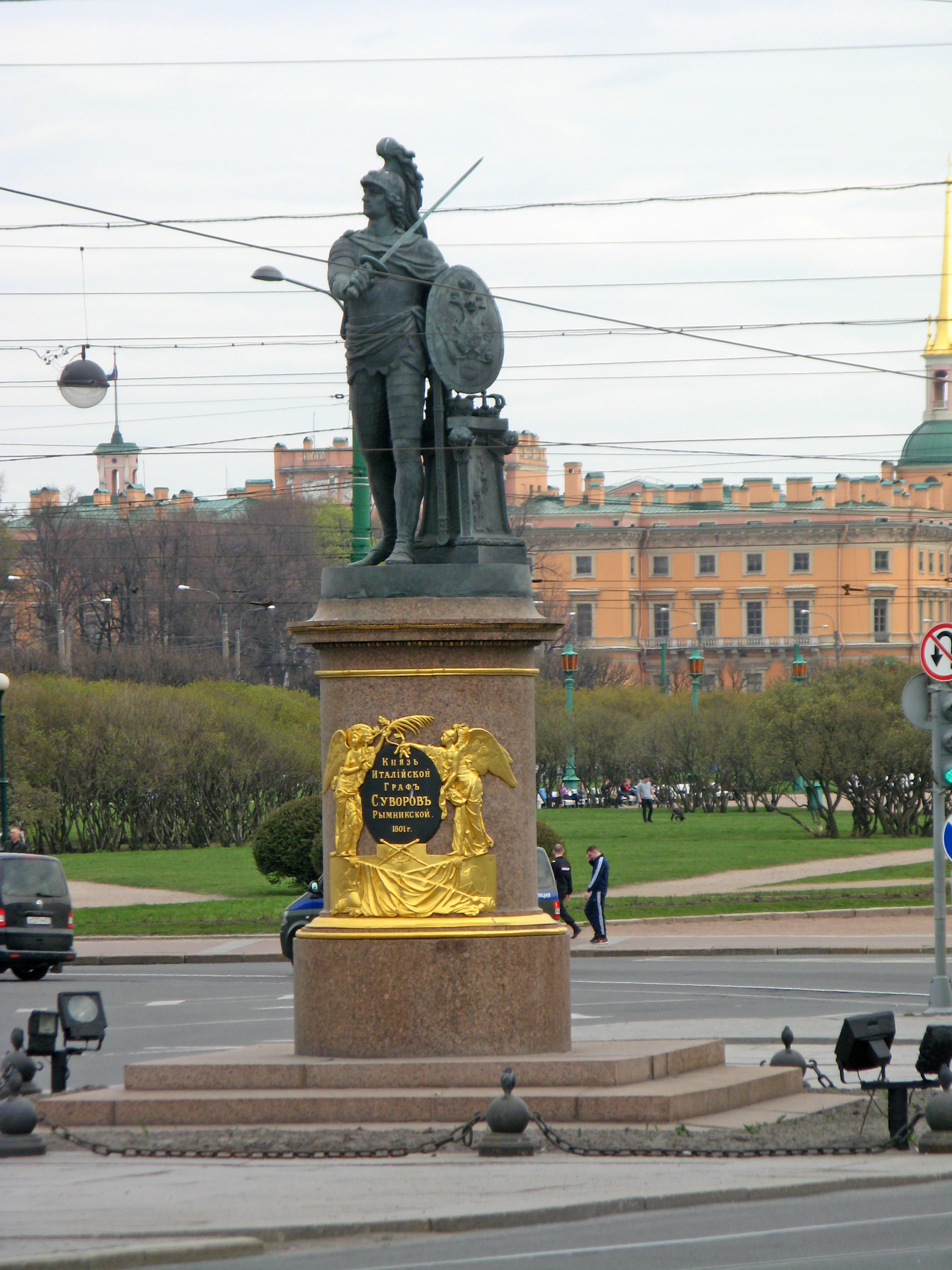
- Suvorov Monument, Suvorov Square
- Interactive map of Suvorov Monument
- Location: Saint Petersburg
- Coordinates: 59°56′45″N 30°19′47″E
- Designer: Mikhail Kozlovsky
- Type: Sculpture
- Material: Bronze (statue); Granite (pedestal)
- Height: 3.37 metres (11.1 ft) (statue); 4.05 metres (13.3 ft) (pedestal)
- Beginning date: 1799
- Completion date: 1801
- Opening date: 1801
- Dedicated to: Alexander Suvorov

The Suvorov Monument (Russian: Памятник Суворову) is a bronze sculpture of Generalissimo Alexander Suvorov located in Saint Petersburg. It is at the centre of Suvorov Square, opposite the Field of Mars and the Trinity Bridge, and between the Marble Palace and the Saltykov Mansion.

Commissioned in 1799 by Emperor Paul I to commemorate Suvorov's Italian expedition that year, the execution was entrusted to sculptor Mikhail Kozlovsky. His design was approved in early 1800, and depicted Suvorov in the allegorical guise of the god Mars. The sculpture was cast in bronze, but neither Paul nor Suvorov lived to see its unveiling, which took place in May 1801. The monument marked a number of firsts, it was the first monument in Russia to someone other than a member of the Imperial family, and the first time that a monument had been ordered during the subject's lifetime. It was also first major monument created entirely by Russian craftsmen.

The monument was originally planned to be located in Gatchina, though the site was changed to the Tsaritsyn Meadows, later the Field of Mars. It was unveiled in the presence of Emperor Alexander I, many of his generals, and Suvorov's son Arkadi. The monument was moved to its present location in 1818 as part of a general reconstruction of the area by architect Carlo Rossi. It now stands at the centre of Suvorov Square. Its pedestal was replaced in the 1830s, and it survived the siege of Leningrad undamaged.

== Commission ==
The monument was developed by order of Emperor Paul I, to commemorate Suvorov's 1799 Italian expedition, for which he received the victory title of "Prince of Italy". The granite pedestal bears the inscription: "The Prince of Italy, Count Suvorov-Rymniki. 1801."

== Design and execution ==
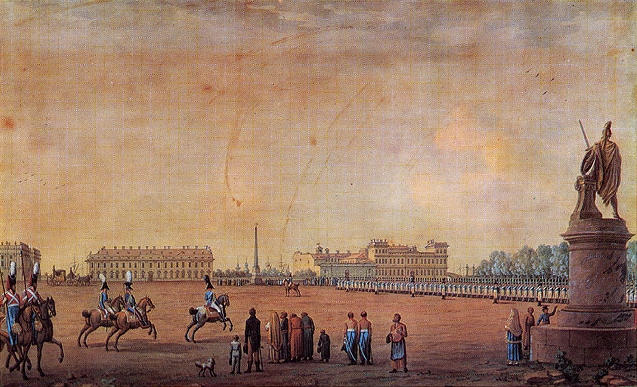
The monument, at right, in its original location in 1807, in the Field of Mars

The figure of Suvorov was sculpted in bronze by Mikhail Kozlovsky between 1799 and 1801, with his proposed design being approved in January 1800. Suvorov is depicted in the allegorical guise of the god Mars, with a raised sword in his right hand and with a shield in his left, in classical armour and helmet. The face of the figure does not exactly resemble Suvorov, but is intended to be symbolic of a "heroic" figure. The figure stands beside an altar with reliefs of Faith, Hope and Love, on which the papal tiara and crowns of Austria and the Kingdom of Sardinia are placed, protected by the figure's shield, which bears the Russian coat of arms. The cartouche on the pedestal is supported by figures representing the genius of Glory.

The monument was cast in bronze by Vasily Ekimov in the foundry workshop of the Imperial Academy of Arts, with the bronze bas-relief on the pedestal sculpted by Fyodor Gordeyev. In the agreement with Ekimov signed on 12 October 1800, it was arranged that the statue would be cast and polished by 1 April 1801. The foundry however was experiencing a particularly heavy workload, with the gates for the Mikhailovsky Castle, and statues, bowls and vases for the Grand Cascade at the Peterhof Palace being cast there, resulting in some delays for the monument. The pedestal was made of marble to the design of Andrey Voronikhin, using materials left over from the construction of Saint Isaac's Cathedral. Kozlovsky made several complaints against the contractors building the pedestal, accusing them of poor workmanship. As completed, the statue stands 3.37 metres (11.1 ft), with the pedestal 4.05 metres (13.3 ft) high. It was officially unveiled on 17 May [O.S. 5 May] 1801. It was the first monument in Russia to someone other than a member of the Imperial family or its earlier predecessors, and the first time that a monument had been ordered during the subject's lifetime. It was also first major monument created entirely by Russian craftsmen. In the event, neither Suvorov nor Paul lived to see its completion. Suvorov died in May 1800, while Paul was killed during a palace coup in March 1801. Instead the new emperor, Paul's son, Alexander I, attended the unveiling, along with many of his generals, and Suvorov's son Arkadi.

== Location ==
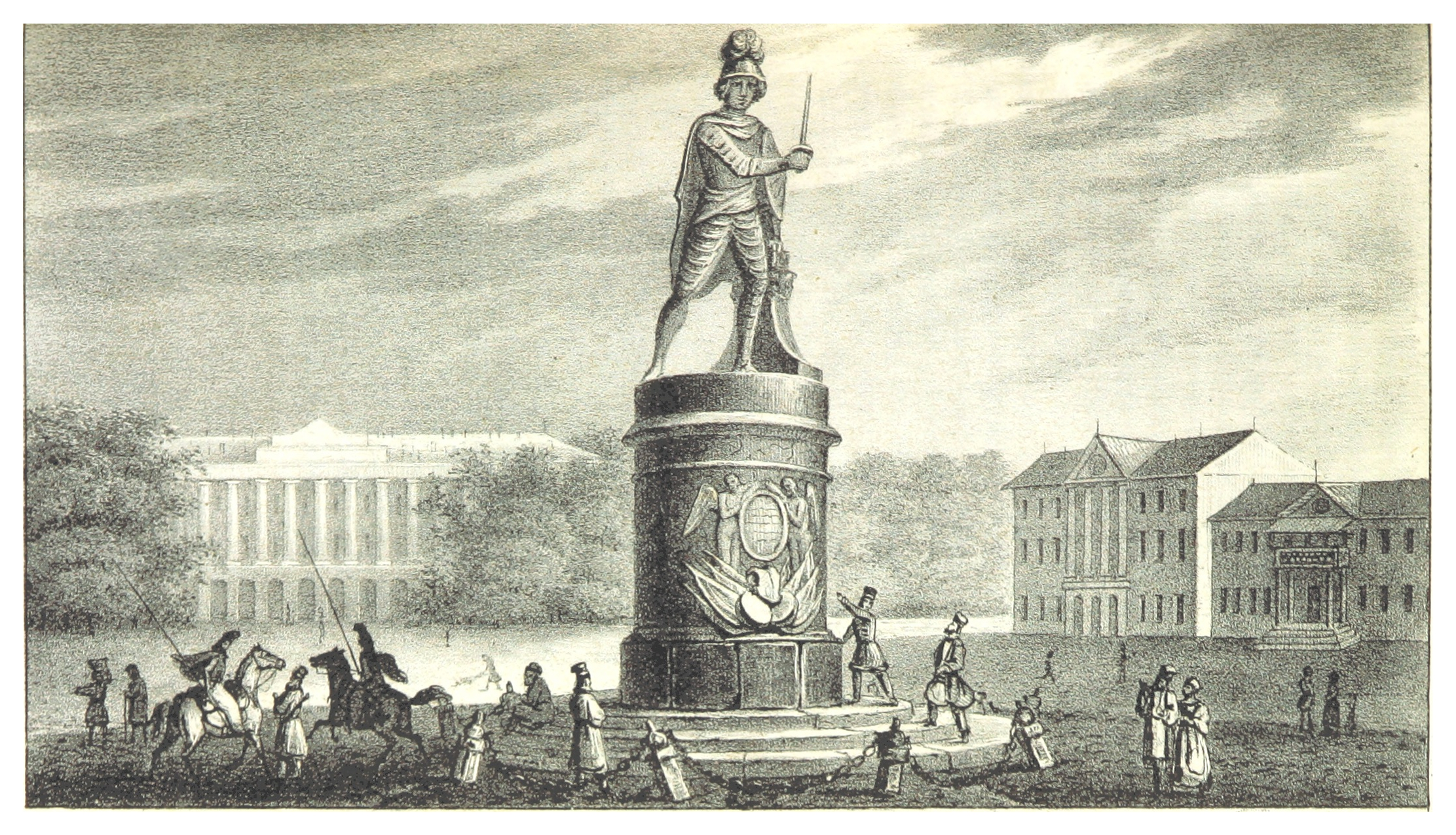
An 1836 depiction of the monument

The monument was initially to be placed in Gatchina, until Emperor Paul designated a new site so as to be close to his new residence at the Mikhailovsky Castle. The monument was originally located in the southern part of the Tsaritsyn Meadows, now the Field of Mars, close to the Moyka River. In 1818 the area around the Mikhailovsky Castle was redeveloped by architect Carlo Rossi, who suggested moving the monument to a newly created square facing the River Neva. Emperor Alexander I approved the suggestion, and the square became known as Suvorov Square. At some point between 1801 and 1818 a chain fence supported by cannon balls was erected around the monument. In 1834 the original marble pedestal was found to be suffering from cracking, and was replaced with a pink granite pedestal of the same design between 1836 and 1838.

During the siege of Leningrad plans were made to hide the monument in the cellar of a nearby house, but the window opening was too small and the plan to hide the monument was never carried out. A story arose that one of the numerous bombs dropped on the city narrowly missed the monument and instead struck the cellar of the house. The monument was the subject of a 1941 poem by Vsevolod Rozhdestvensky, "Suvorov Monument", with its opening lines

"Among the Baltic sunny spaces,

Over the wide open Neva,
As the god of war, rose bronze Suvorov

A vision of Russian battle glory."

The monument survived the siege of Leningrad undamaged.

Preliminary models of the monument are displayed in Moscow's Tretyakov Gallery and Saint Petersburg's Russian Museum.
