= Suvorov Square (Saint Petersburg) =

Square in Saint Petersburg

Coordinates: 59°56′45″N 30°19′47″E

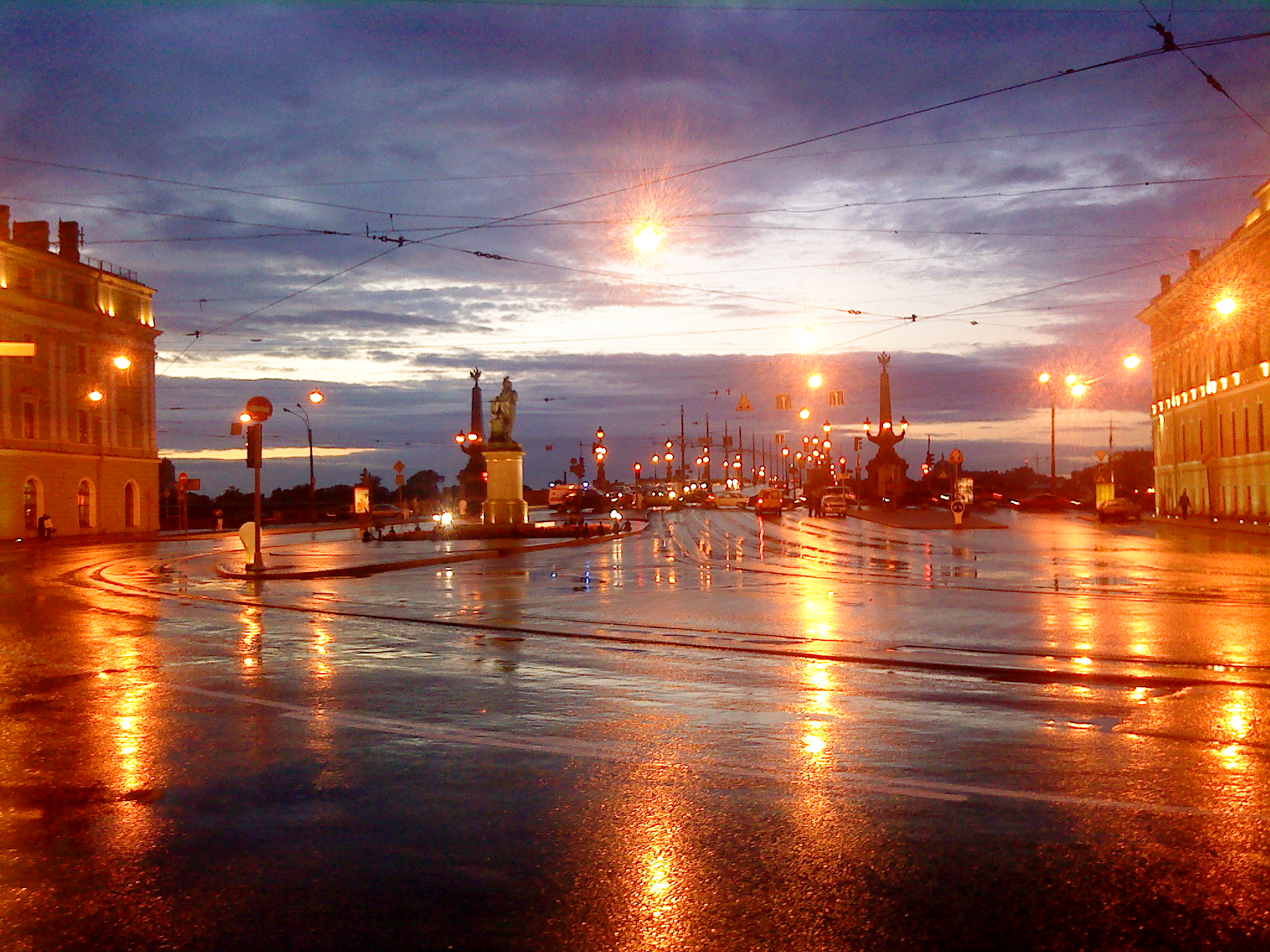
View of Suvorov Square by night from the Field of Mars

Suvorov Square (Russian: Суворовская площадь, romanized: Suvorovskaya Ploshchad) is a city square in Tsentralny District, Saint Petersburg. It is located between Palace Embankment and the junction of the embankment of the Swan Canal and Millionnaya Street, at the southern end of the Trinity Bridge and the northern end of the Field of Mars. It is bordered to the east by the Saltykov Mansion and to the west by the service wing of the Marble Palace.

== Location ==
Construction on the left bank of the Neva began in the early years of the city's foundation. The riverbank was strengthened with wooden embankments, and from the early 1760s, by stone ones. The embankment was rebuilt between the Summer Garden and the Winter Palace in the 1770s and the river frontage became a popular site for the palaces and townhouses of the wealthy and powerful. One plot, now occupied by the Saltykov Mansion, passed through a number of owners, before being gifted to Count Nikolai Saltykov by Empress Catherine the Great.

== Development ==
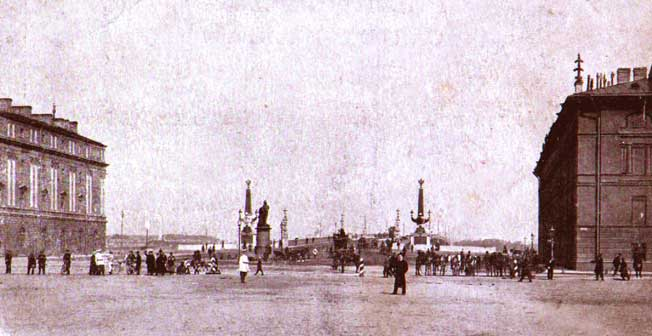
Suvorov Square at some point between 1903 and 1917

By the late eighteenth century, the plot of land to the west of the Saltykov Mansion was owned by Alexander Vorontsov. Vorontsov passed on the land and it became a garden for the Saltykov Mansion, stretching between the mansion and the Marble Palace, and separating the Tsaritsa Meadow from the bank of the Neva. In 1818, the garden was bought by the treasury and redeveloped into a square to the designs of architect Carlo Rossi. Mikhail Kozlovsky's monument to Alexander Suvorov was moved to the centre of the new square, and from 1823, it became known as Suvorov Square. Rossi reworked the facade of the Saltykov Mansion facing the square, adding new window openings to the previously blank walls, and creating a porch entrance onto the square. He also continued Sadovaya Street alongside the Field of Mars, connecting it with Millionnaya Street at the square. From 1824, a pontoon bridge across the Neva linked Suvorov Square with Trinity Square, becoming known as Trinity Bridge. The pontoon design was replaced by a permanent structure in 1903. During the winters from 1895 to 1910, a tramway was laid across the ice of the Neva from the square towards the Vyborg side of the river, and later to the Petersburg side.

The square today is crossed by the access roads for the Trinity Bridge, and those connecting from Swan Canal embankment and Millionnaya Streets to the Palace Embankment. The Suvorov Monument is on a traffic island at the centre of the square.
