= Al-Hakam =

Al-Hakam or Al-Hakum may refer to:

- Hakam, one of the names of God in Islam

== People ==
- Al-Hakam I (died 822), Córdoban emir
- Al-Hakam II (915–976), caliph of Córdoba
- Sulayman ibn al-Hakam (died 1016), caliph of Córdoba
- Al-Hakim bi-Amr Allah (985–1021), Fatimid caliph of Cairo
- Al-Hakam ibn Abi al-'As (c. 600), father of Umayyad caliph Marwan I and uncle of Uthman ibn Affan
- Ibn 'Abd al-Hakam (c. 800–c. 871), Egyptian historian

== Other ==
- Al Hakam (newspaper), English-language, Islamic newspaper, published weekly by the Ahmadiyya Muslim Jamaat
- Al Hakum (Iraq), former biological weapons factory, Iraq

== See also ==
- Hakim (disambiguation)
