= Hakimi (surname) =

Hakimi (Arabic: حكيمي, Persian: حکیمی), derived from the Arabic male given name and surname Hakim, is an Arabic (primarily Maghrebi) and Persian surname. Notable people with the surname include:

- Abdul Latif Hakimi, former Taliban spokesman
- Achraf Hakimi (born 1998), Moroccan footballer
- Ali Hakimi (born 1976), Tunisian Swiss middle distance runner
- Arezoo Hakimi (born 1995), Iranian kayaker
- Danial Hakimi (born 1963), Iranian film, stage, TV series and radio actor
- Ebrahim Hakimi (1871–1959), Iranian Azerbaijani politician
- Eklil Ahmad Hakimi (born 1968), Afghan diplomat
- Fardin Hakimi (born 1995), Afghan footballer
- Karim Hakimi (born 1933), Iranian Canadian entrepreneur and optician
- Hakimi Ismail (born 1991), Malaysian triple jumper
- S. L. Hakimi (1932–2005), Iranian-American mathematician
- Tehila Hakimi (born 1982), Israeli poet and author
- Hakimi Abdullah (born 1999), Malaysian professional footballer
