= Al Hakam (newspaper) =

English-language Islamic newspaper

- Al Hakam front page on 11 January 2019
- Type: Weekly newspaper
- Owner: Ahmadiyya Muslim Jama'at
- Founder: Sheikh Yaqub Ali Irfani
- Publisher: al-Sharikat al-Islamiyyah
- Founded: October 8, 1897 (in Urdu)
- Ceased publication: July 1943
- Relaunched: March 23, 2018; 8 years ago (in English)
- City: London
- Country: United Kingdom
- ISSN: 2754-7388 (print); 2754-7396 (web)
- Website: alhakam.org
- Free online archives: Print Edition

Al Hakam (Arabic: الحكم, romanized: al-ḥakam, IPA: [æl ħakam], literally "The Arbiter") is an English-language, Islamic newspaper, published weekly by the Ahmadiyya Muslim Jama'at.

== History ==
Al Hakam was the first newspaper and organ of the Ahmadiyya Muslim Jama'at. It was originally launched in 1897 by a companion of Mirza Ghulam Ahmad of Qadian. The companion, Sheikh Yaqub Ali Irfani, who lived in Amritsar, worked as a qualified and practising journalist. Talking about how Al Hakam began, he states:

In August 1897, Henry Martyn Clark filed a lawsuit against the Promised Messiah. I noted down the happenings of that court case with the title Doosra Jang-e-Muqaddas [the second holy war]. It was then that I felt the need for a newspaper of the Community to make necessary announcements and answer political and theological allegations.

Hence, he wrote a letter to Mirza Ghulam Ahmad seeking permission to start a newspaper in Urdu. Mirza Ghulam Ahmad wrote back:

I do not have any experience in this field. Our Community is in need of a newspaper but it consists of poor people and cannot bear the financial burden. If you can start it with your own expertise, then go ahead. May Allah bless it.

Sheikh Yaqub Ali Irfani thus began the weekly Urdu Al Hakam newspaper, with the first issue being published on 8 October 1897. Until the end of 1897, it was printed by Riyaz-e-Hind Press in Amritsar. Thereafter, it moved to the headquarters of the Ahmadiyya Jamaat in Qadian and, with brief intervals, continued publication until July 1943.

== Significance ==
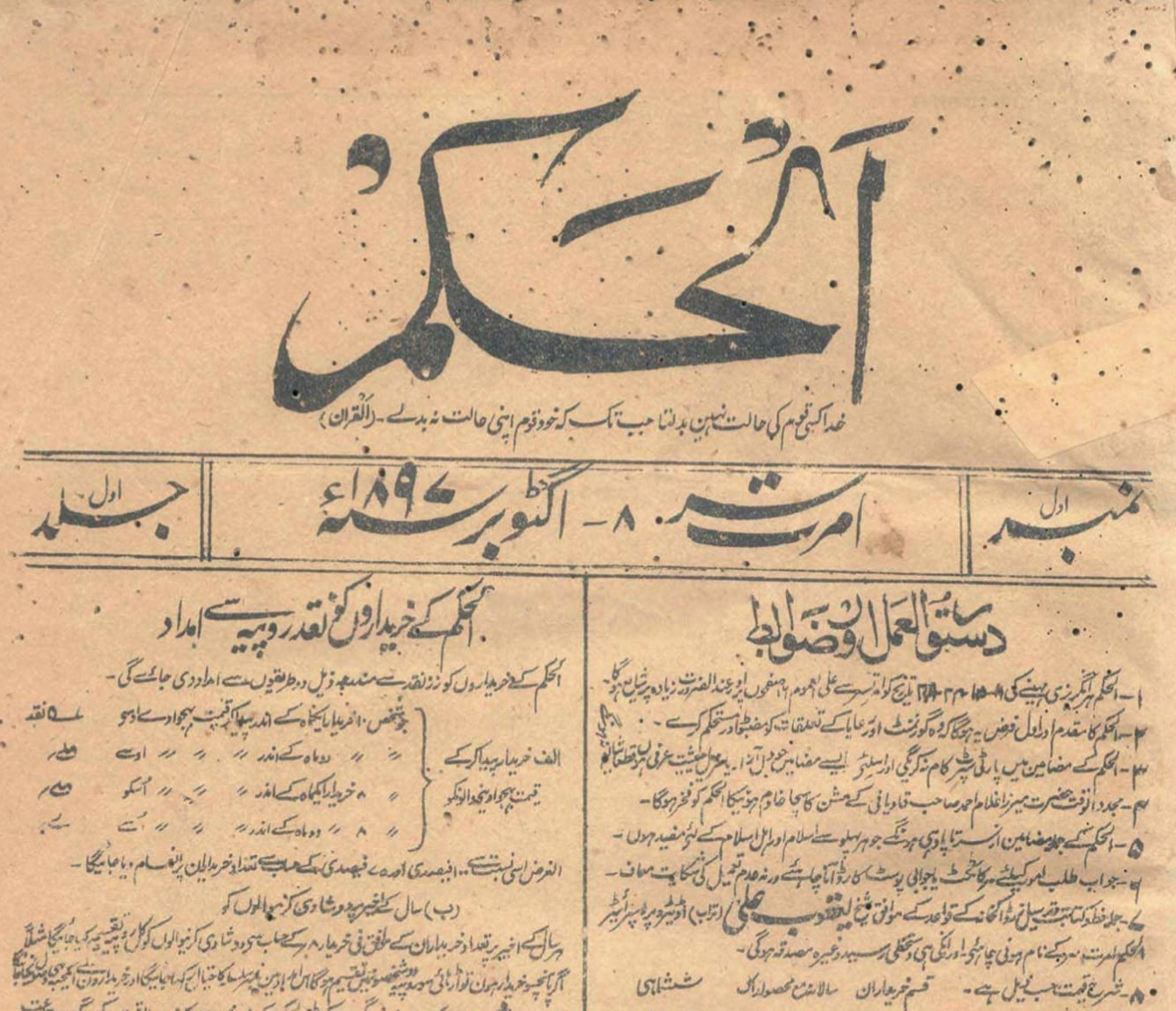
The first issue of Al Hakam (Urdu), dated 8 October 1897.

Prior to the launch of Al Hakam, the press coverage on the Ahmadiyya Muslim Community would only come from the external papers of India, not affiliated to the Community. However, as the late Rev. Dr Spencer Lavan of McGill University in Montreal noted,

The creation of Al Hakam... helped bridge the information gap... While the significance of the Panjab press in affecting public opinion during this period is only now being studied, the contribution which Ahmadi publications made, in spite of the limited number of copies per issue, must have been significant in spreading the Ahmadi position to the Urdu reading public.

In 1934, when Al Hakam relaunched after one of the intervals, Mirza Bashiruddin Mahmud Ahmad, the second worldwide head of the Ahmadiyya Muslim Jamaat, wrote a message:

Al Hakam is the very first newspaper of the Community. The service it was able to render, which Al Badr was also able to in the later years of the Promised Messiah's life, cannot be attained by any other newspaper, even if millions of rupees are spent in its pursuit. Whether Al Hakam survives in its physical form or not, I wish to say that its name shall live forever. No extraordinary task of the Community can be achieved without mentioning it as it contains the history of this Community.

Al Hakam played a significant role in recording the early history of the Ahmadiyya Community. Hence, wherever Mirza Ghulam Ahmad went or spoke, it would be recorded in Al Hakam. Al Hakam would also contain, what Ahmadis considered, the latest divine revelations, dreams and visions to Mirza Ghulam Ahmad. Many articles of the pioneers of the Community would be published, including articles written by Mirza Ghulam Ahmad. In 1901, the newspaper Al Badr also took on this responsibility.

== Relaunch as an English Weekly ==
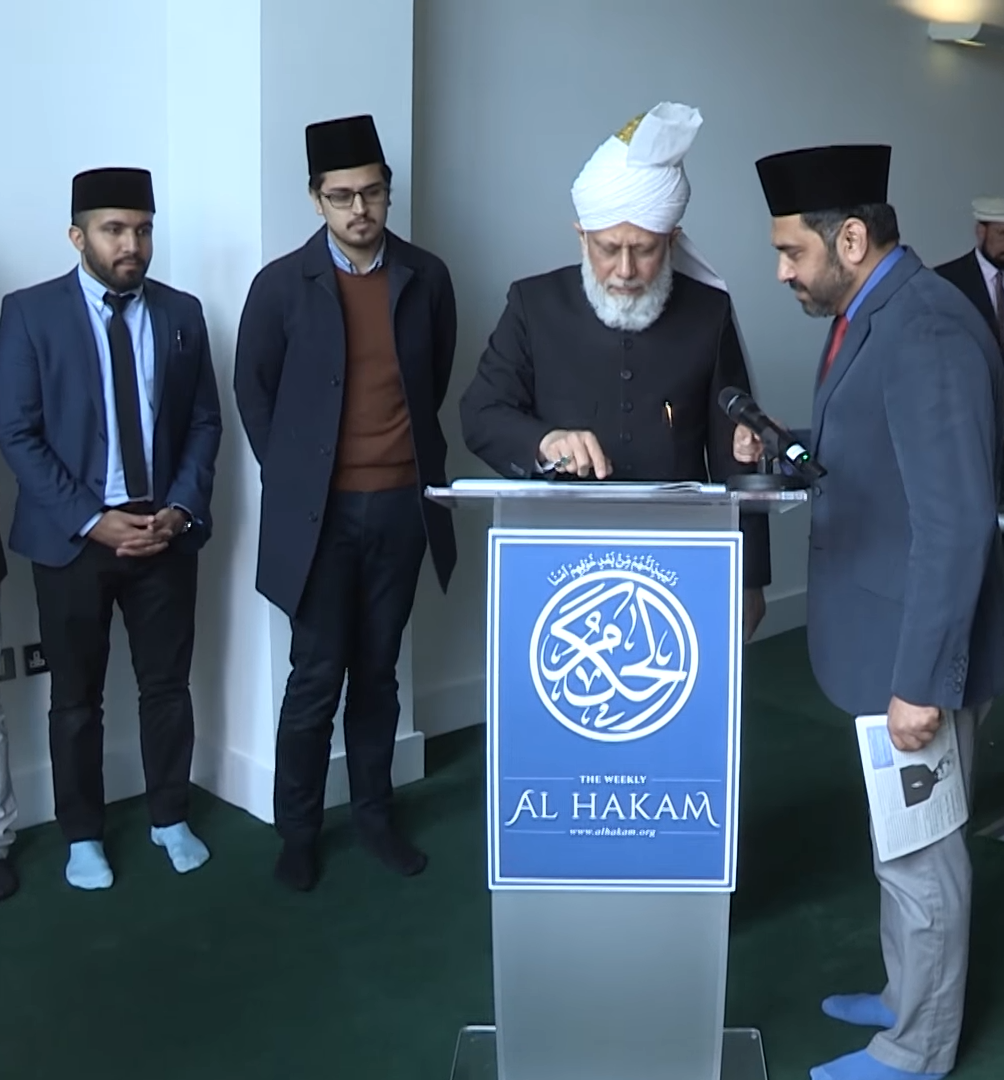
Hazrat Mirza Masroor Ahmad, at the launch of Al Hakam Weekly (English), Friday 23 March 2018, Baitul Futuh Mosque, Morden, UK.

Al Hakam was relaunched on 23 March 2018 as an English-language newspaper by Mirza Masroor Ahmad, the fifth worldwide head of the Ahmadiyya Muslim Jamaat, during his Friday sermon. Announcing the relaunch, he stated:

Today, there is also an announcement and a source of good news in that the Al Hakam newspaper that was once published in Qadian will now be published from here. In 1934 it began printing again but stopped soon after. Today, on the Promised Messiah Day it will be launched from here [UK] in the English language. This newspaper was the first newspaper published in the time of the Promised Messiah (as). It will be printed in a small quantity, however, immediately after this Friday Sermon it will be available on the internet on www.alhakam.org Similarly, there will be an app called “Al Hakam” for mobile phones and tablets from which one will be able to easily download the newspaper and read it. The app for the familiar mobile devices such as Apple and Android and will be available for download after this sermon. The first edition is a special feature for the Promised Messiah Day and in future, a new edition will be uploaded every Friday. Also there will be a few printed copies available. Nevertheless, people will be able to derive benefit from this. After this launch, may God Almighty enable it to continue incessantly. Since this newspaper will be in English, therefore the English speaking members should derive maximum benefit from this.

== Content ==
Al Hakam publishes the official English translation of the weekly sermons of Khalifatul Masih, the worldwide head of the Ahmadiyya Muslim Community as well as exclusive interviews with him. Answers to Everyday Issues is another feature wherein answers to questions given by Khalifatul Masih on various occasions in his written correspondence and during MTA International programmes are officially published.

There has also been a special emphasis on the preserving the history of the Ahmadiyya Muslim Community in Al Hakam with regular feature articles such as 100 Years Ago, This Week in History and From the Archives.

In addition to the above, Al Hakam also publishes news from the Ahmadiyya Muslim Community around the world, book reviews, special editorials commenting on contemporary affairs from the Islamic viewpoint and articles on the various aspects of the theology of Islam and the Ahmadiyya Muslim Community.
