= Akimov =

Akimov (Russian: Акимов, masculine) and Akimova (Russian: Акимова, feminine) is a Russian surname derived from the given name Akim. It is shared by the following people:

- Alexander Ivanovich Akimov (1895–1965), Soviet general
- Aleksandr Fyodorovich Akimov (1953–1986), the shift supervisor at the Chernobyl Nuclear Power Plant
- Aleksandr Yevgenyevich Akimov (b. 1972), a Russian football manager and former player
- Aleksandra Akimova (5 May 1922–29 December 2012), navigator during World War II and Hero of the Russian Federation
- Andrey Akimov (b. 1953), a Russian businessman
- Dmitri Akimov (1980–2026), Russian footballer
- Iryna Akimova (b. 1960), a Ukrainian politician
- Ivan Akimov (1754–1814), a Russian Neoclassical painter
- Maxim Akimov (b. 1970), a Russian politician
- Nikolay Akimov (1901–1968), a Russian theater director
- Olga Akimova (b. 1983), an Uzbekistani ice dancer
