= Trinity Bridge, Saint Petersburg =

Bridge over Neva river in Saint Petersburg, Russia

Trinity Bridge Тро́ицкий мост
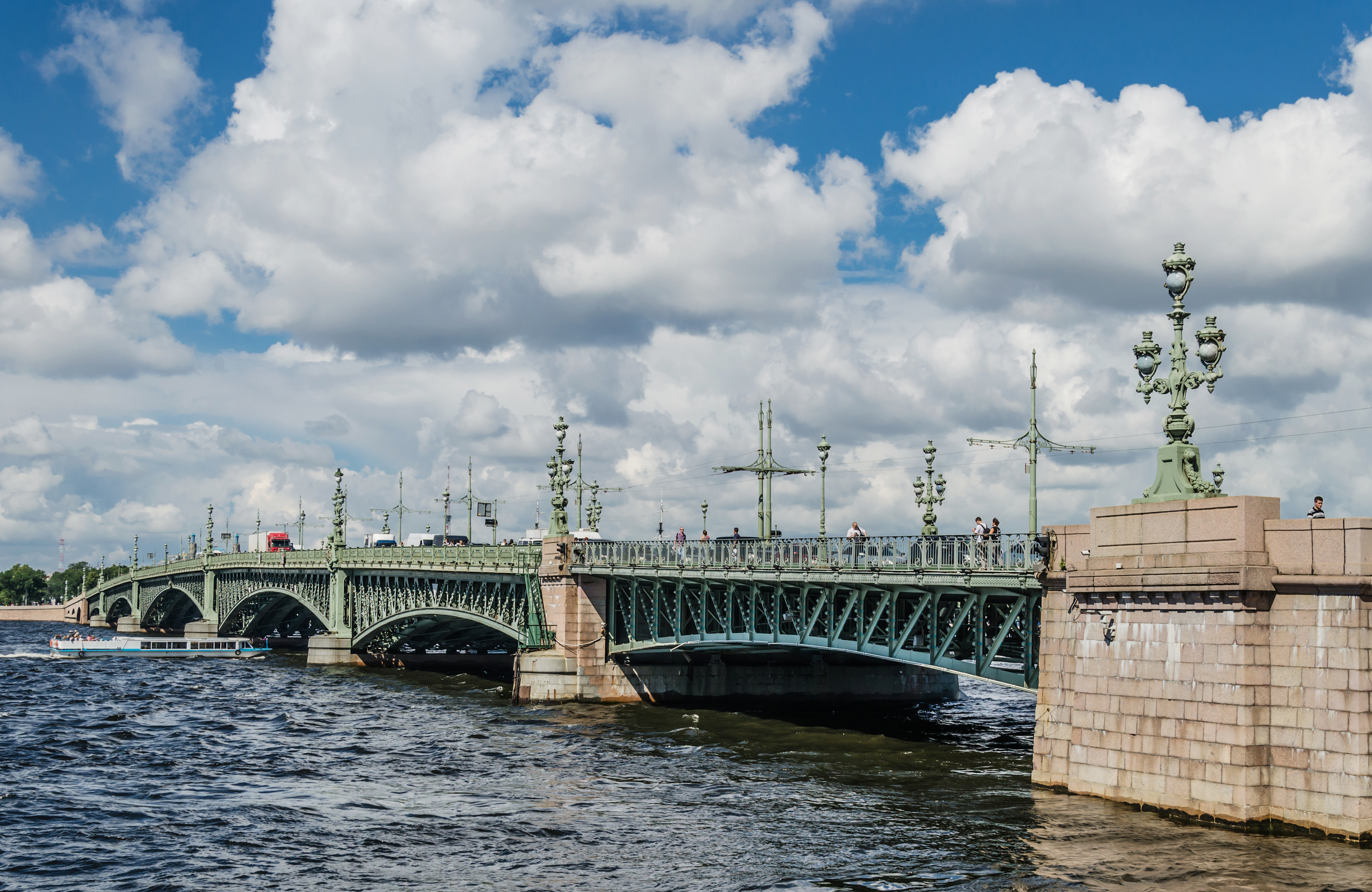
- Coordinates: 59°56′55.51″N 30°19′38.66″E
- Carries: 4 lanes of roadway, tram lines
- Crosses: Neva River
- Locale: Saint Petersburg

Characteristics
- Design: Segmental bridge, bascule bridge
- Total length: 582 meters
- Width: 24 meters
- Longest span: 43 meters

History
- Opened: 1903, first half

Location
- Interactive map of Trinity Bridge; Тро́ицкий мост

Trinity Bridge (Russian: Тро́ицкий мост, Troitskiy Most) is a bascule bridge across the Neva in Saint Petersburg, Russia. It connects Kamennoostrovsky Prospect with Suvorov Square. It was the third permanent bridge across the Neva, built between 1897 and 1903 by the French firm Société de Construction des Batignolles. It is 582 meters (1,909 ft) long and 23.6 meters (77 ft) wide.

The bridge takes its name from the Old Trinity Cathedral which used to stand at its northern end. In the 20th century, it was known as Equality Bridge (Russian: мост Ра́венства, 1918–1934) and Kirovsky Bridge (Russian: Ки́ровский мост, 1934–1999)

== History and construction ==
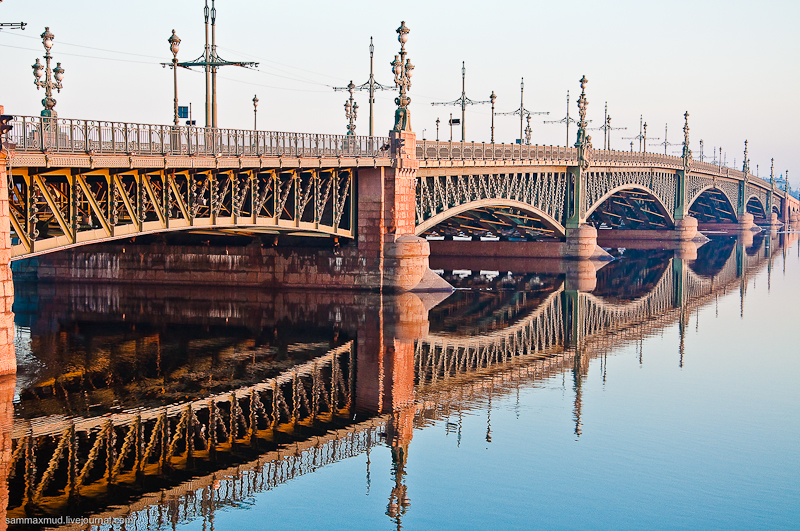
The Trinity Bridge is a landmark of Art Nouveau design

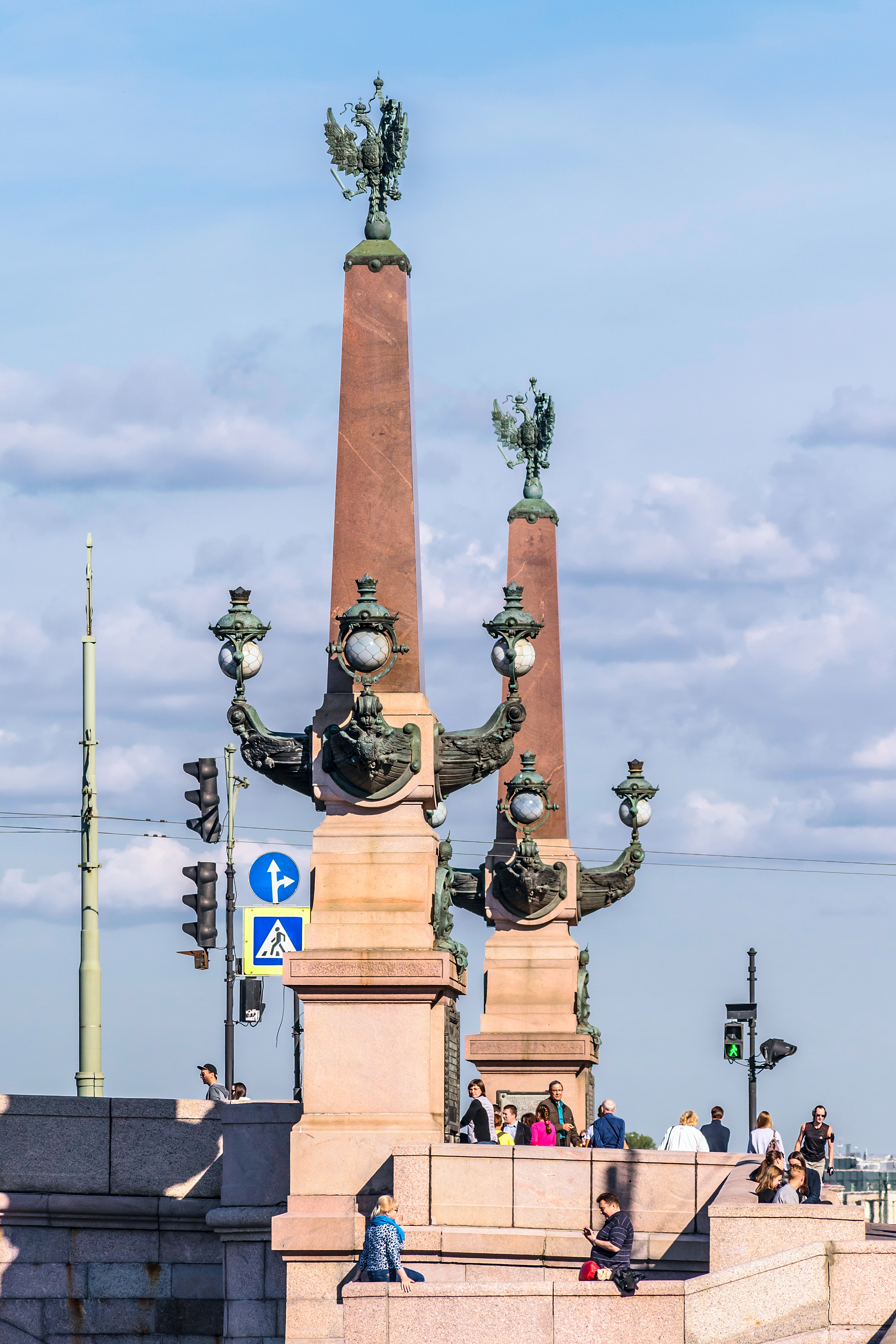
Rostral Сolumns of Trinity Bridge

In 1803, the Voskresensky ponton bridge, which was built in 1786 near Voskresensky Prospect (now Chernyshevsky Prospect), was moved to the Summer Garden. In 1825, the pontoon Suvorovsky Bridge was built to link Suvorov Square with Troitskaya (Trinity) Square.

In 1892, a contest for constructing a permanent Troitsky Bridge was announced. There were 16 entrants from Russian and European engineers, including one from the French engineer Gustave Eiffel, the creator of the famous Eiffel Tower in Paris. The winner was the out-of-competition conception by Paul-Joseph Bodin aided by Arthur Flachet, Vincent Chabrol, and Claude Patouillard from the French Société de Construction des Batignolles. Some contributions to their proposal were provided by a team of Russian engineers. A special commission from the Imperial Academy of Arts, including Leon Benois also participated in the project.

Construction began on 12 August 1897. Félix Faure, the president of France was present at the ceremony. In the same political spirit, Nicholas II of Russia laid the foundation stone for the Pont Alexandre III in Paris, another memorial to the Franco-Russian Alliance. The bridge was completed in 1903, in time for the 200-year anniversary of Saint Petersburg.

Originally the bridge had nine spans. Five of these were permanent metallic riveted spans, with novel console-arch-beam systems and gradually increasing span length from banks to the middle of the river. A three-arch granite viaduct linked the metallic central section to the right bank, and a two-winged bascule span joined it to the left bank. The design of the central spans, in which single uncut girders bridge more than one span, significantly relieves the stress on the central part of the arches, decreasing the support required in the river and giving the span structures a gentle arch shape. The bridge is decorated with cast iron gratings with artistic casting, granite pylons with lanterns and metallic three-colour lanterns in the Art Nouveau style.

The obelisks flanking the entrance to the bridge from Suvorov Square were remodeled in 1955. In 1965–1967 the bascule span was rebuilt as a one-winged, lifting design. Its length was extended to 43 meters (141 ft) and its appearance modelled on the other metal spans. A granite arch slope was set on the left bank. During the reconstruction water slopes were enlarged and granite benches were set along left bank abutment.

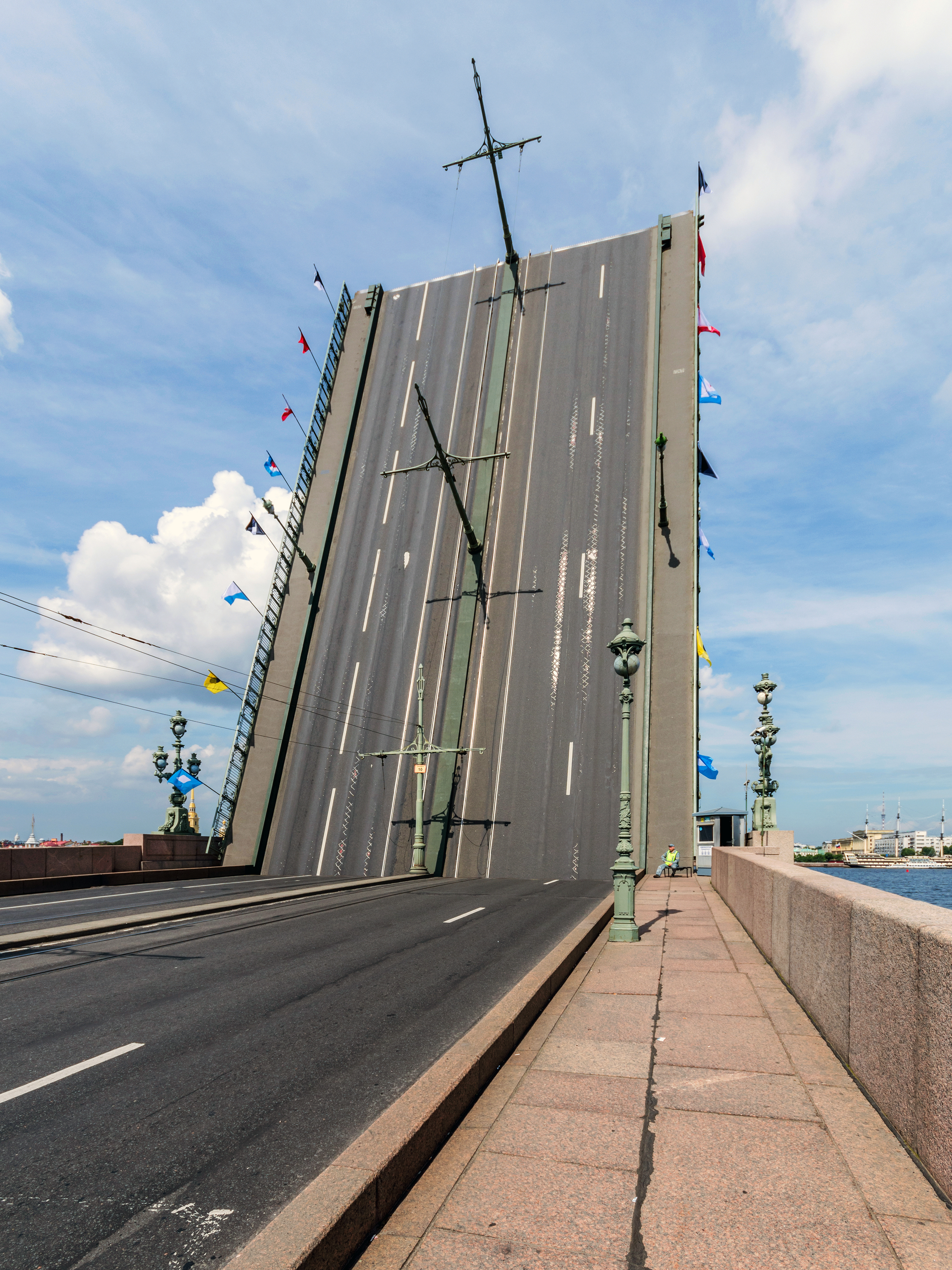
Raised Span of Trinity Bridge

It is believed that the Soviet pilot Valery Chkalov flew his plane under the Trinity Bridge in the 1930s – while there is no documentary proof of this event, his wife has confirmed it. In 1940, Evgeny Borisenko repeated this feat several times during the filming of Valery Chkalov. Chkalov's feat is referenced by Boris Grebenshchikov in his song "Under the Bridge, like Chkalov" ("Под мостом как Чкалов").

== See also ==
- List of bridges in Saint Petersburg
