= Spencer Lavan =

American scholar and minister (1937–2016)

- Born: December 31, 1937
- Died: September 26, 2016 (aged 78)

Academic background
- Education: McGill University

Spencer Lavan (December 31, 1937 – September 29, 2016) was an American scholar of comparative religion and a Unitarian Universalist minister.

== Biography ==
Lavan was a graduate of Tufts University, Harvard Divinity School, and McGill University (M.A .in Islamic Studies and Ph.D. in Comparative Religion). He received three honorary degrees: from the Protestant Theological Institute of Cluj/Kolosvar, Romania, the school preparing Hungarian-speaking Unitarian ministers for pulpits in Transylvania, 1995; from Meadville/Lombard Theological School, 1997; and from the University of New England, 1999.

Since his ordination in 1962, Spencer Lavan served as a Unitarian Universalist minister mostly by teaching in higher education. He taught "Religions of Islam and India" and was a dean to undergraduates at Tufts University (1969–79). He organized and chaired the Department of Medical Humanities at the University of New England College of Osteopathic Medicine in Maine (1982–88). Finally, he served as the Dean and Chief Executive of the Meadville Lombard Theological School at the University of Chicago (1988–96). From 1984-88 he was editor of the Journal of Medical Humanities and Bio-Ethics. He served as a co-editor for the Dictionary of Unitarian Universalist Biography. Lavan was the author of several books on religious subjects, served as the president of the Unitarian Universalist Historical Society, and founded the Collegium: Liberal Religious Studies.

Spencer Lavan died September 29, 2016. He had been married to Susan for over fifty years. They are the parents of four adult children, Jonathan, Daniel, Timothy and Joanna and have six grandchildren, Charles, Peter, Anna, Isaac, Lucia and Malcolm.

Lavan died on September 29, 2016, at the age of 78.

== Works ==
- The Ahmadiyah Movement: a History and Perspective (Delhi: Monohar Book Service, 1974),
- Unitarians and India: A Study in Encounter and Response (Boston: Beacon Press, 1977)
