= Vasily Ekimov =

Russian sculptor (1758-1837)

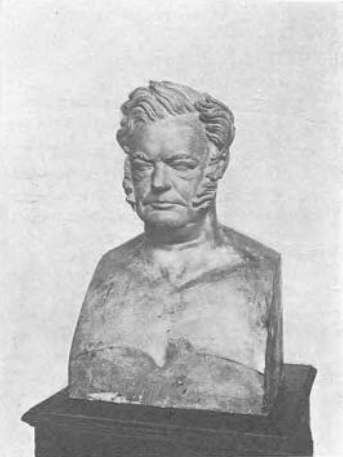
Ekimov

Vasily Petrovich Ekimov (Russian: Василий Петрович Екимов; 1756 or 1758 – 1837), sometimes spelled as Yekimov (Russian: Екимов) or Yakimov (Russian: Якимов), was a Russian Empire master founder.

== Life ==
Of Turkish origin, Ekimov's precise date and place of birth are unknown; however, he was captured in Ottoman Turkey aged 12 and taken to Russia. There he became a pupil at the Imperial Academy of Arts in 1764, specialising in copperwork and chased work in 1776 and casting a miniature copy of the Peter the Great Monument in 1777. That copy won a 100 ruble prize from the Academy's Council and he left the Academy as a second-class apprentice in 1779.

He became a master craftsman in 1798 and returned to the Academy to teach casting. Alexander I of Russia put him in charge of casting the Suvorov Monument to designs by Mikhail Kozlovsky in 1799. He was in charge of the Academy's foundry from 1805 to 1837 as professor and academician. In 1805 he also taught bronze-casting and in 1831 he received the title of master founder and chaser.

== Works ==
- Bronze Horseman, St Petersburg - to designs by Étienne Maurice Falconet
- Samson Fountain, Peterhof Palace - to designs by Mikhail Kozlovsky
- Gates of Paradise, copies after Lorenzo Ghiberti, Kazan Cathedral, St Petersburg
- Statues of generals Mikhail Kutuzov and Barclay de Tolly near the Kazan Cathedral, Nevsky Prospect, St Petersburg - to designs by Boris Orlovsky and Samson Sukhanov
- Monument to Minin and Pozharsky, Moscow - to designs by Ivan Martos
