= Akim Monet =

American and Swiss photographer

Akim Monet is an American and Swiss photographer who lives and works in New York and Berlin, Germany. Monet has been showing his work publicly since 2002. He has had several solo exhibitions, including Passage to India in New York and Mexico City, Homage to Gaudi in Geneva and Belgium, and Pergamon in Paris.

== Early life and education ==
Akim Monet was born in Geneva, Switzerland, and studied comparative literature and art history at Cornell University, New York State. The subject of his thesis was "Reading of Camus' L'Etranger across the work of Yves Klein".

== Career ==
It was in India, in 1992, that Monet began his photographic investigation of historical treasures. Absorbing the particulars of the region, he was deeply affected by the power of the ancient temples and monuments that are still a vital part of daily life there.

He used photography as a way of processing what he was feeling. Having accumulated a trove of images, he found looking at the negative strips more akin to his actual experience of the places and became obsessed with the instant when the shutter clicks open and the emulsion on the celluloid reacts to the sudden onslaught of light; with the magic that occurs at that micro-moment around 1/100 of a second when light hits the negative. The tiny images on the negative strips seemed to burn: stone was transformed into molten lava and shadow became light.

With no formal training in photography, Monet developed a process by which the final prints match the original negatives. In New York, seven years after India, he learned how to use digital printing technology to achieve glorious high-resolution prints of his negatives at a grand scale.

All the details in a scene are imprinted on a negative. Monet sees a positive print as a reproduction, and a negative as the imprint of reality, the testimony of a microsecond. He is fascinated by the manner in which negatives reveal what the eye cannot see, the complement of what the eye does see. He marvels how black is the absence of light and white the sum of all colors. He tries to see how light travels through space and hits an object: some rays are absorbed and others reflected. The latter are those that allow us to see color; it is those that affect the emulsion on the celluloid.

In India, he discovered the “space between”: that space between the Ying and the Yang, that space between the sum of all colors and its absence. He saw this space in his negatives and found a way to enlarge them in order to explore this enchanted gap. Monet used the same rendering process for the following projects and, in 2003, he published a book entitled The space between including three different body of works: “Passage to India”, “Homage to Gaudí” and “Exotic Flowers”.”

Liz Christensen, Curator at the Deutsche Bank Fine Art Program said about his work: "Fascinated by the moment captured by the opening and closing of the shutter – creating what the artist calls the “burn” of the image – Monet's photographs conjure a mystery and beauty akin to alchemy."

== Photographic Projects ==
1992 Passage to India

“My fellow artist Akim Monet invited me to lunch at his home in New York City. As I entered his dining room, I was immediately struck by several large scale photographs of India. Their saturated colors emanating ethereal light beckoned me to look closer. I felt the spirituality of India, standing there with the afternoon light streaming through the windows, highlighting the details in Monet’s images. The solarized effect of the print adds to the sense of otherworldliness and reminds me of an x-ray—allowing the viewer a view within and an understanding of a Passage to India. Akim Monet is a true visionary in more ways than one”. (Andres Serrano, Artist).

"One of the strongest images was the Taj Mahal (1992). The building, shot from a distance and mirrored in the long reflecting pool before it, is pale and ghostly, seeming to hover like a mirage against a moody burnt orange sky. Only after trying to make sense of the pictorial space does it become clear that Monet actually turned the picture upside down, further playing with the idea of negative and positive. He seems drawn to the dual nature of India, finding the spiritual and carnal at its roots". (Hilarie M. Sheets)

In addition to being review in ARTnews by Hilarie M. Sheets (excerpt above), the 1992 exhibition "Passage to India" was also short-listed by Vince Aletti in The Village Voice.

2000 Homage to Gaudí

"Homage to Gaudí" explores the interface of architecture and nature, inside and outside. The architect’s undulating, flourishing edifices -walls, caves, gates, towers- are so organic, it’s hard to tell where the manmade stops and nature takes up, particularly when rendered in Monet’s inside-out palette. Monet also focuses more here on the kind of cropping and composing devices inherent in photography, making two towers shot from above seem so reduced in scale they look like side-by-side bowling pins, and framing them inside a rugged vertical opening in an image he says is an homage to a Barnett Newman "zip" painting. Another in the series shows a pigeon sitting on a balcony encrusted with dazzling floral mosaics, juxtaposed with actual nature beyond that has the ethereal quality of an Impressionist landscape dissolving into dappled paint.

2001 Exotic Flowers

The idea with "Exotic Flowers", as Monet explains, was to go back to square one, and just as a painter learns the rudiments of making still lifes and portraits, so too would he return to the basics. Again dichotomy plays a powerful role in Monet's gorgeous pictures taken in Bali of wild growth not seen on this side of the equator as well as of transvestites negating their gender in New York’s yearly Wigstock festival. Conceptually, the two subjects hold together both in their fragility and lavish statement, and the same colors echo in each -the deep purple of the sunflower in one drag queen’s hair, for instance, is laced throughout the tropical plants. The hothouse effect of Monet's pictures speaks to a moment when the world feels on the verge of boiling over, where the same Balinese paradise that he photographed was subsequently bombed by terrorists. Part of the beauty and intensity of these photographs has to do with the convergence of opposites, of past and present. They stand sublimely poised in the space between.

2004 Pergamon

"To look at Akim Monet's photographs of Greek sculptures is to experience these familiar objects of near perfection in an unexpected light. Cropped from the context of the Pergamon Museum in Berlin and delivered to a pictorial world of lush blue tonalities, these stone gods and humans enacting their timeless postures take on a taut psychological currency. Monet's signature process of printing directly what is on his negatives rather than inverting them into positive images is what gives all his photographs their saturated, heightened palette. In the "Pergamon" series, his technique renders hard, cold stone fluid and aqueous. Whether by highlighting elements of abstraction or teasing out moments of human drama, Monet's images bring into relief a contemporary relevancy he finds in these classical sculptures. The idea of duality plays out even in the presentation of these Ilfochrome prints, which are two dimensional but assume the heft of stone under their boxlike lamination of thick polished Plexiglas, a nod to minimalist sculpture. In a subtle dialogue among mediums, Monet approaches his three-dimensional subjects from a painterly sensibility and returns the traces of light stolen with his camera back to the object world.

In a subtle dialogue among mediums, Monet approaches his three-dimensional subjects from a painterly sensibility and returns the traces of light stolen with his camera back to the object world."

2004 Domus Adriani

The series Domvs Adriani was captured in 2004 at Hadrian's Villa, Tivoli, Italy, a UNESCO World Heritage Site that has inspired many artists including Italian master engraver Giovanni Battista Piranesi. The complex of over 30 buildings was created as a retreat from Rome for Emperor Hadrian early in the 2nd century AD.

Hadrian's Villa was the greatest Roman example of an Alexandrian garden, the recreation of a sacred landscape. It included a pool and an artificial grotto that were named Canopus and Serapeum. Canopus was an Egyptian city where a temple (Serapeum) was dedicated to the god Serapi. The architecture is Greek influenced (typical in Roman architecture of the High and Late Empire) as seen in the Corinthian columns and the copies of famous Greek statues that surround the pools.

2006 In the Vatican Gardens

″Beauty, forever analyzed, theorized and above all experienced by who loves art, acquires a new expression and a personal dimension through the works of Akim Monet. The traces of our past are promoted by Monet: works, sculptures, buildings, environments of the Italian artistic culture are exalted through the strength of forms and dynamics of individual gestures, which projected in the future, seem to resist indelibly to time. Delicate and elegant chromatics, plays of light, colors and shadows induce the viewer to ponder about the meaning of beauty, giving a new light to antiquities, through which knowledge merges with artistic consciousness″. (Claudio Fortugno).

2009 Rodin. A photographic engagement

″Early in 2009 I was invited to take photographs at the Musée Rodin on a Monday when the museum is closed to the public. I was allowed to wander freely through the rooms and I became engulfed in the world of the master. I discovered a medieval Rodin; gothic, but strangely inviting because the emotions that are played out are familiar, as much on the faces as in the postures, because they belong to humanity – Rodin appropriates them and gives them back to us; he defies time in a vertiginous manner. I discovered his love scenes, or rather the carnal encounters so dear to Rodin. I was stunned when I exited the museum.

On that day I was invited to commune with the work of the sculptor who for me incarnates the notion of engagement – in the past, but also in the future – in life and in the yonder, in brief the engagement in the study of the human condition″. Akim Monet

== Selected exhibitions ==
Monet had his first solo show: Passage to India (2002) at Carosso, LLC Fine Arts, New York; two years later two solo exhibitions: 'Homage to Gaudi' at 5, rue de la Muse Gallery, Geneva and at Maruani & Noirhomme Gallery, Knokke, Belgium. In 2005 Monet had another solo exhibition, 'Pergamon' at the Galerie du XXe Siècle in Paris, France.

Between 2002 and 2007, the artist took part in several group shows in Mexico City, Brussels, Paris and Milan.

== Artist residency ==
In 2005, Monet was invited by the University of Maine New Media Program to be their artist in residence. They commissioned him to make a multimedia "video installation", 'Caves a meditation' with the students there. The artist chose to make a film based on a photographic series he shot the previous year "The Caves". These are a group of photographs taken in one of the most beautiful ancient grottoes in Europe. During millions of years, a powerful river eroded strata of limestone into a surrealist landscape. The Stalactites and stalagmites inhabit this space; they stand in time like actors in the set of nature. Although there are no images of water among the photos of "The Caves”, the grottoes were carved by water. Water for the grottoes acts as the negatives do for images; water is the catalyst for the carvings. Because the pictures are rendered in negative they have a marvelous blue watery hue. Monet "saw" a projected piece made of the images, accompanied by different sounds of water.

== Writing ==
Monet also writes about art.

== Public Collection ==
In 2004 Deutsche Bank Collection in New York acquired three of Monet's large-scale works.

== Berlin Gallery ==
In 2011 Monet opened a gallery in Berlin at Potsdamer Str. 81b. The first Exhibition Fertility ended by November 26, 2011.

== See also ==
- Pictorialism
