= Marble Palace =

Building in Saint Petersburg, Russia

- Мраморный дворец
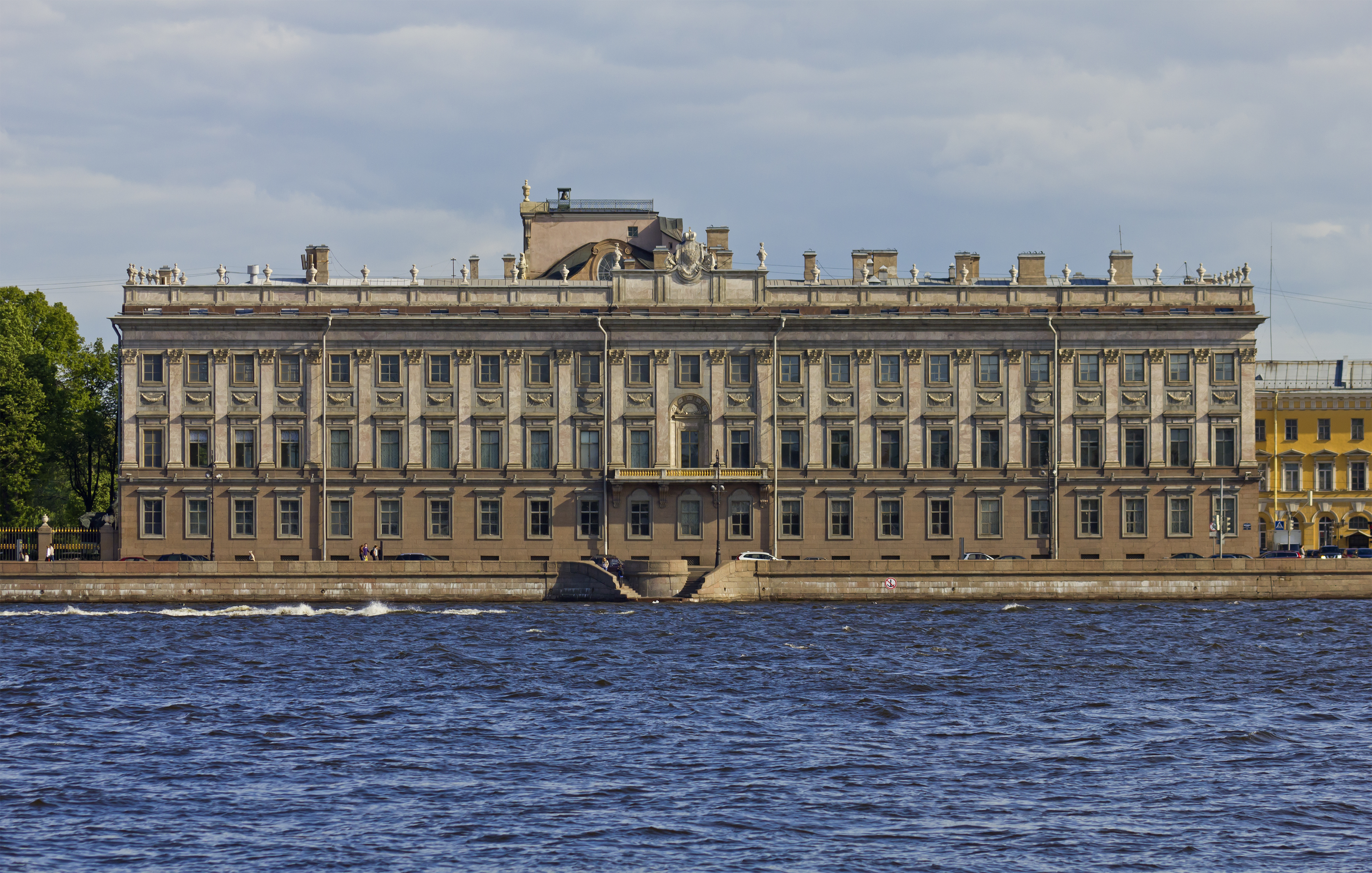
- Marble Palace

- Location within Central Saint Petersburg

General information
- Location: St. Petersburg, Russia
- Coordinates: 59°56′42.64″N 30°19′36.47″E
- Completed: 1785

The Marble Palace (Russian: Мраморный дворец) is one of the first Neoclassical palaces in Saint Petersburg, Russia. It is situated between the Field of Mars and Palace Quay, slightly to the east from New Michael Palace.

== Design and pre-1917 owners ==
The palace was built as a gift from Empress Catherine the Great for Count Grigory Orlov, her favourite and the most powerful Russian nobleman of the 1760s. Construction started in 1768 to designs by Antonio Rinaldi, who previously had helped decorate the grand palace at Caserta near Naples, and lasted for 17 years.

The palace takes its name from its opulent decoration in a wide variety of polychrome marbles. A rough-grained Finnish granite on the ground floor is in subtle contrast to polished pink Karelian marble of the pilasters and white Urals marble of capitals and festoons. Panels of veined bluish gray Urals marble separate the floors, while Tallinn dolomite was employed for ornamental urns. In all, 32 disparate shades of marble were used to decorate the palace.

The plan of the edifice is trapezoidal. Each of its four facades, though strictly symmetrical, has a different design. One of the facades conceals a recessed courtyard, where an armored car employed by Lenin during the October Revolution used to be mounted on display between 1937 and 1992. Nowadays, the court is dominated by a sturdy equestrian statue of Alexander III of Russia, the most famous work of sculptor Paolo Troubetzkoy; formerly it graced a square before the Moscow Railway Station.

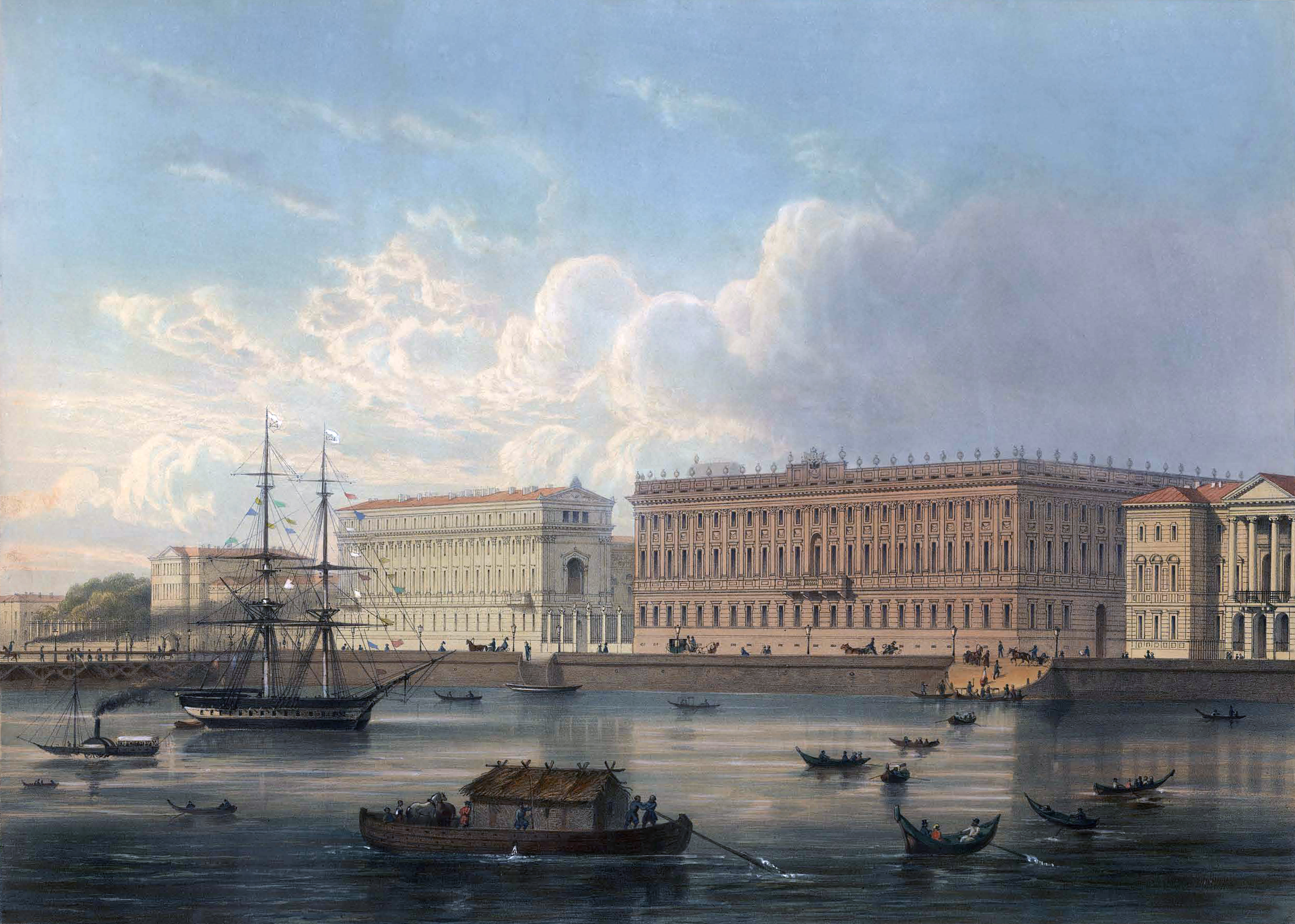
Marble Palace by Iosif Charlemagne, 1860

Fedot Shubin, Mikhail Kozlovsky, Stefano Torelli and other Russian and foreign craftsmen decorated the interior. In 1797–1798 the structure was leased to Stanisław II Augustus, the last king of Poland. Thereafter the palace belonged to Grand Duke Constantine Pavlovich and his heirs from the Konstantinovichi branch of the House of Romanov.

In 1843, Grand Duke Constantine Nikolayevich decided to redecorate the edifice, renaming it Constantine Palace and engaging Alexander Brullov as the architect. Only the main staircase and the Marble Hall survived that refacing.

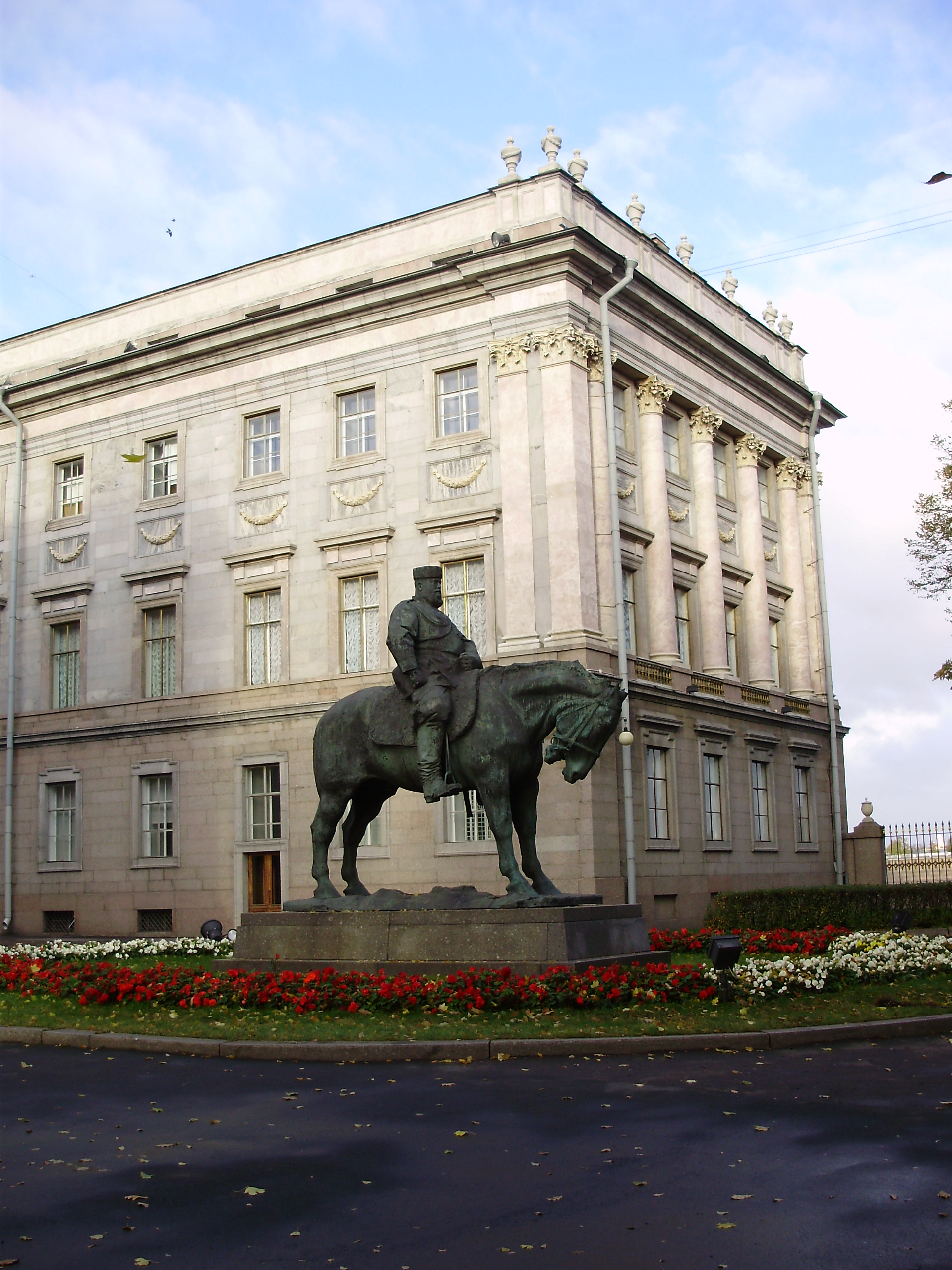
Equestrian statue of Alexander III from Vosstaniya Square

== Usage during Soviet times ==
During the Soviet era, the palace successively housed the Ministry of Labour (1917–19), the Academy of Material Culture (1919–36), and, most notably, the main local branch of the Moscow-based Central (i.e. National) Lenin Museum (1937–91) with sub-branches across Leningrad in Lenin's memorial apartments all over the city - the places where he lived or stayed during his various periods in what was then Saint Petersburg.

== Present state: a branch of Russian Museum ==
Currently, the palace accommodates permanent exhibitions of the Russian State Museum.

=== Interior ===
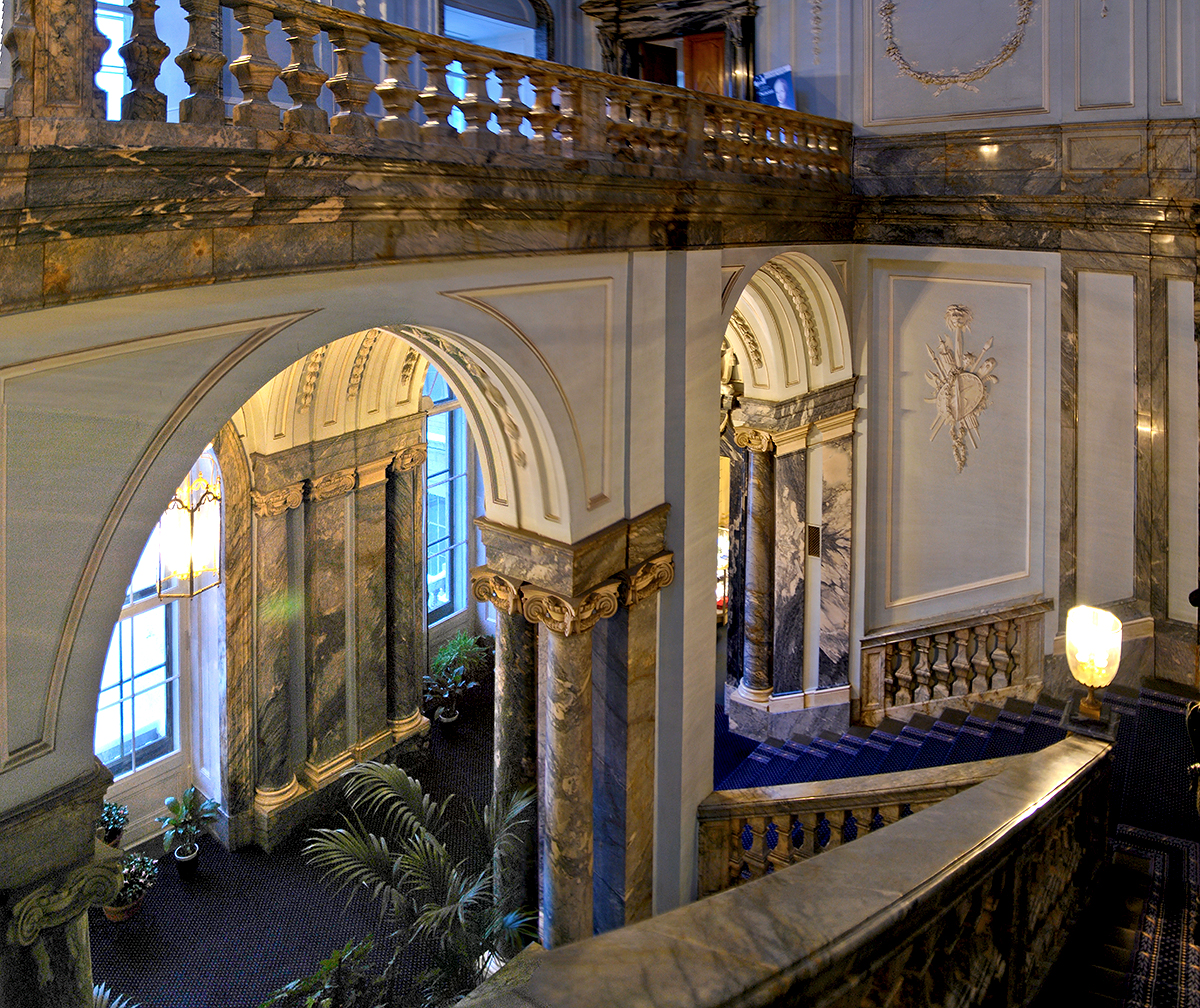

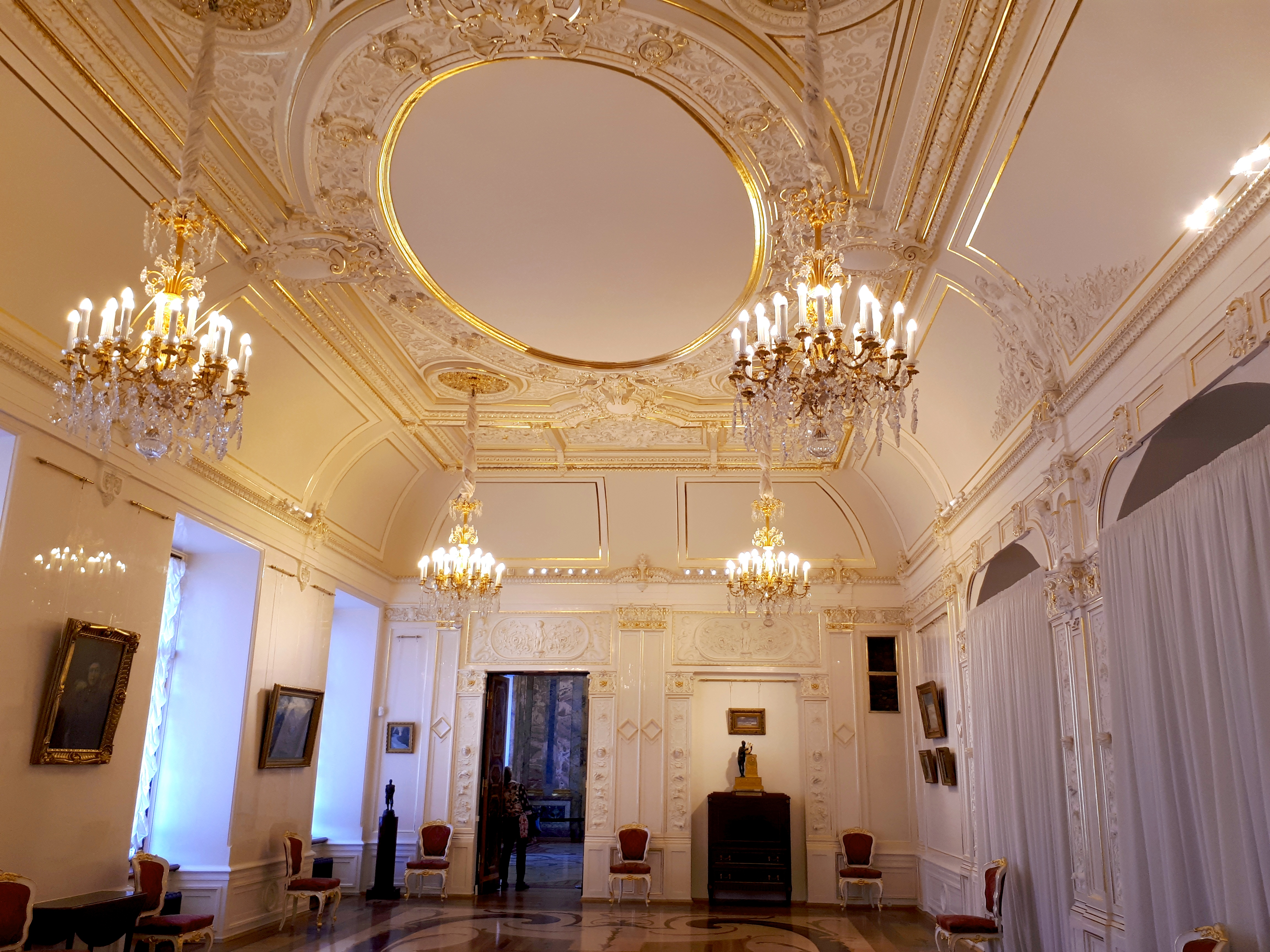

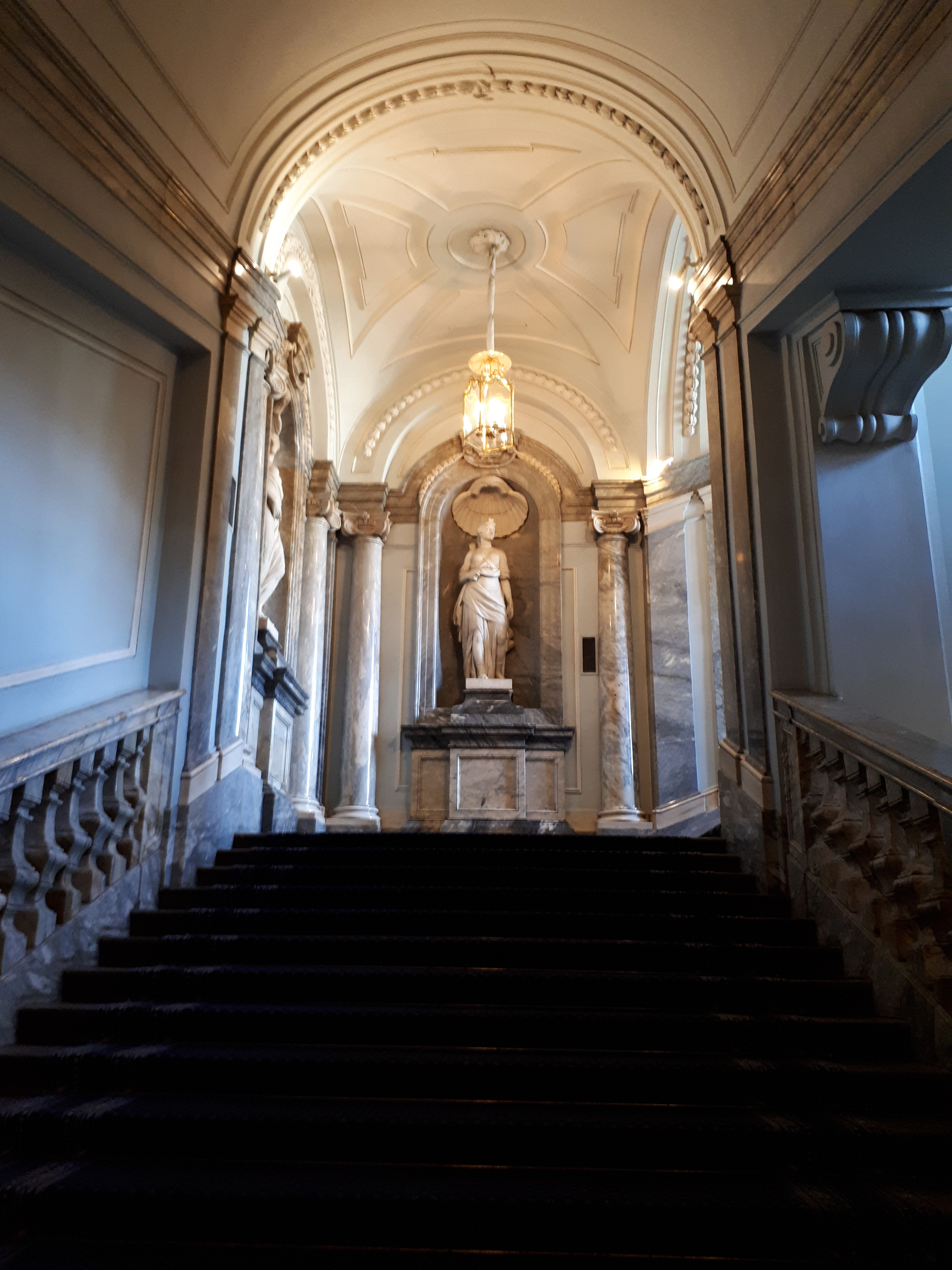

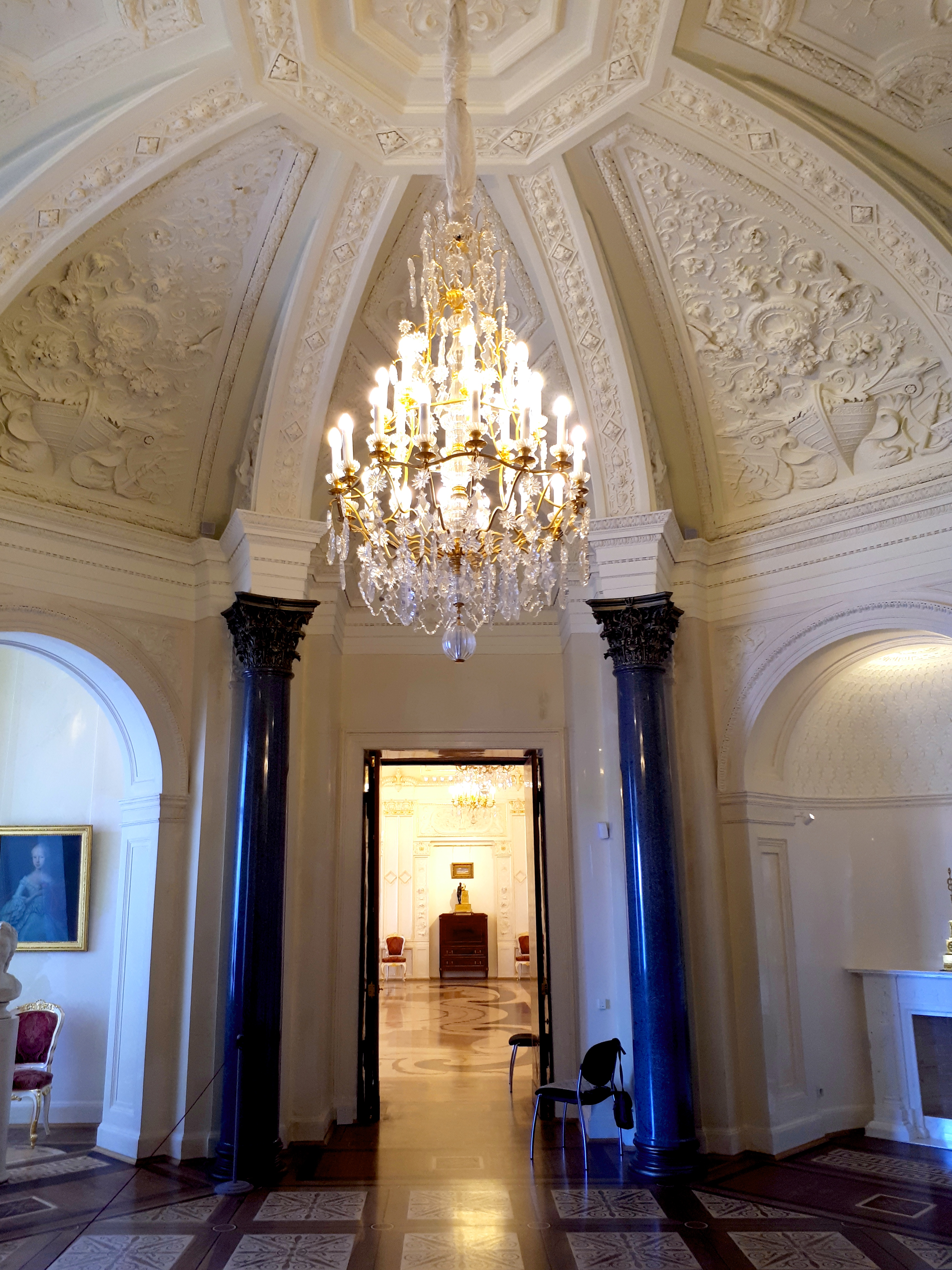

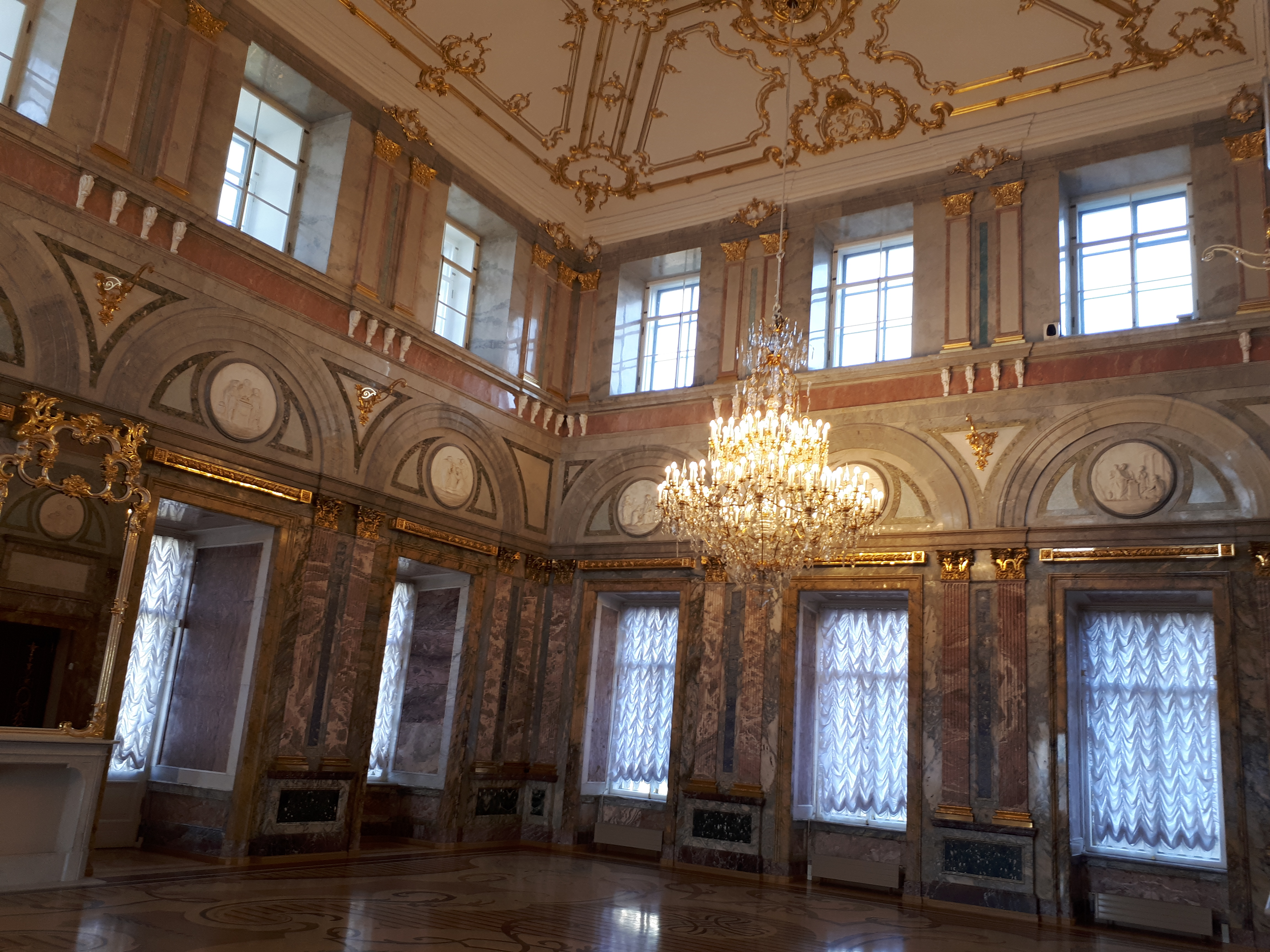

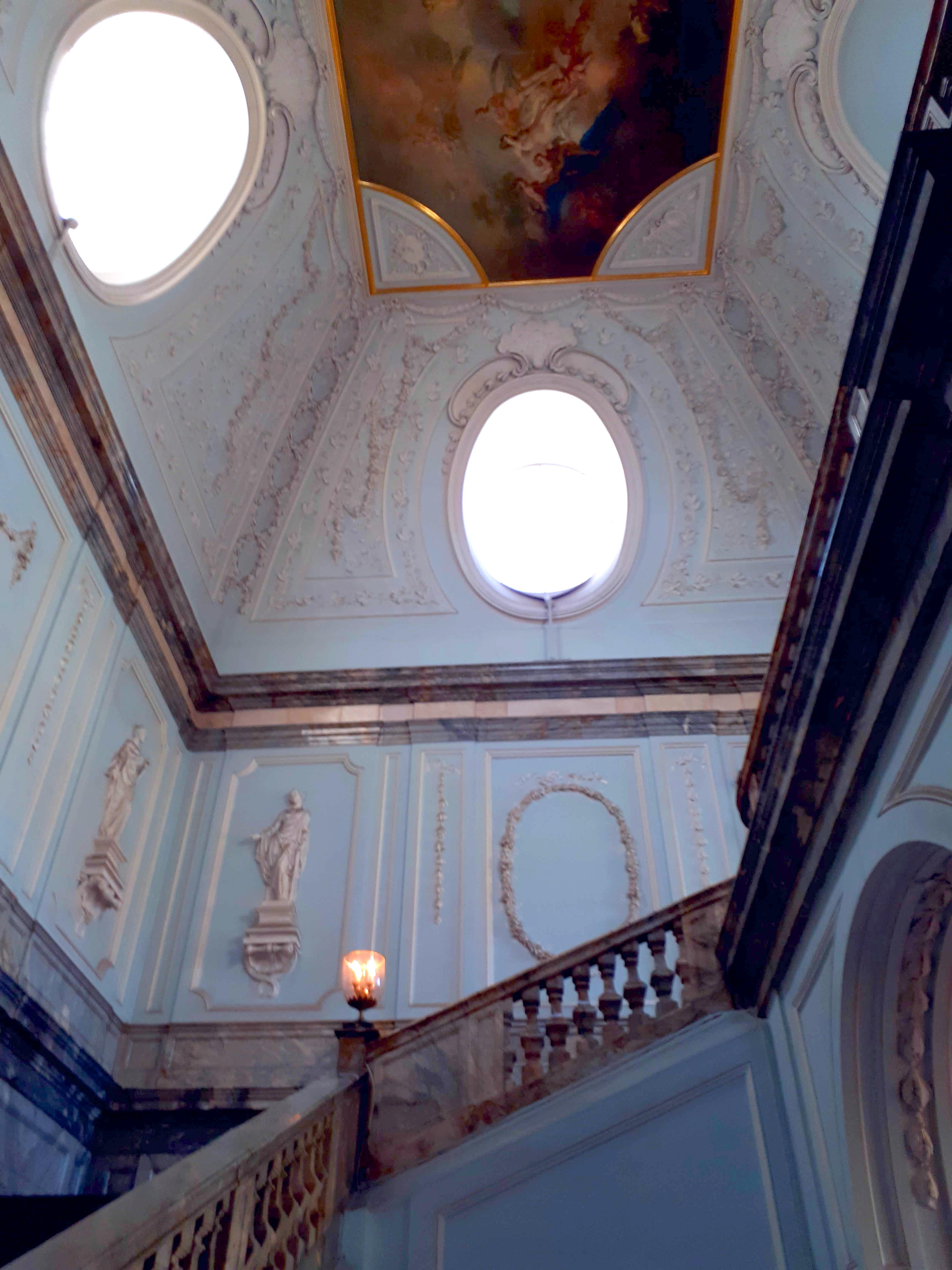

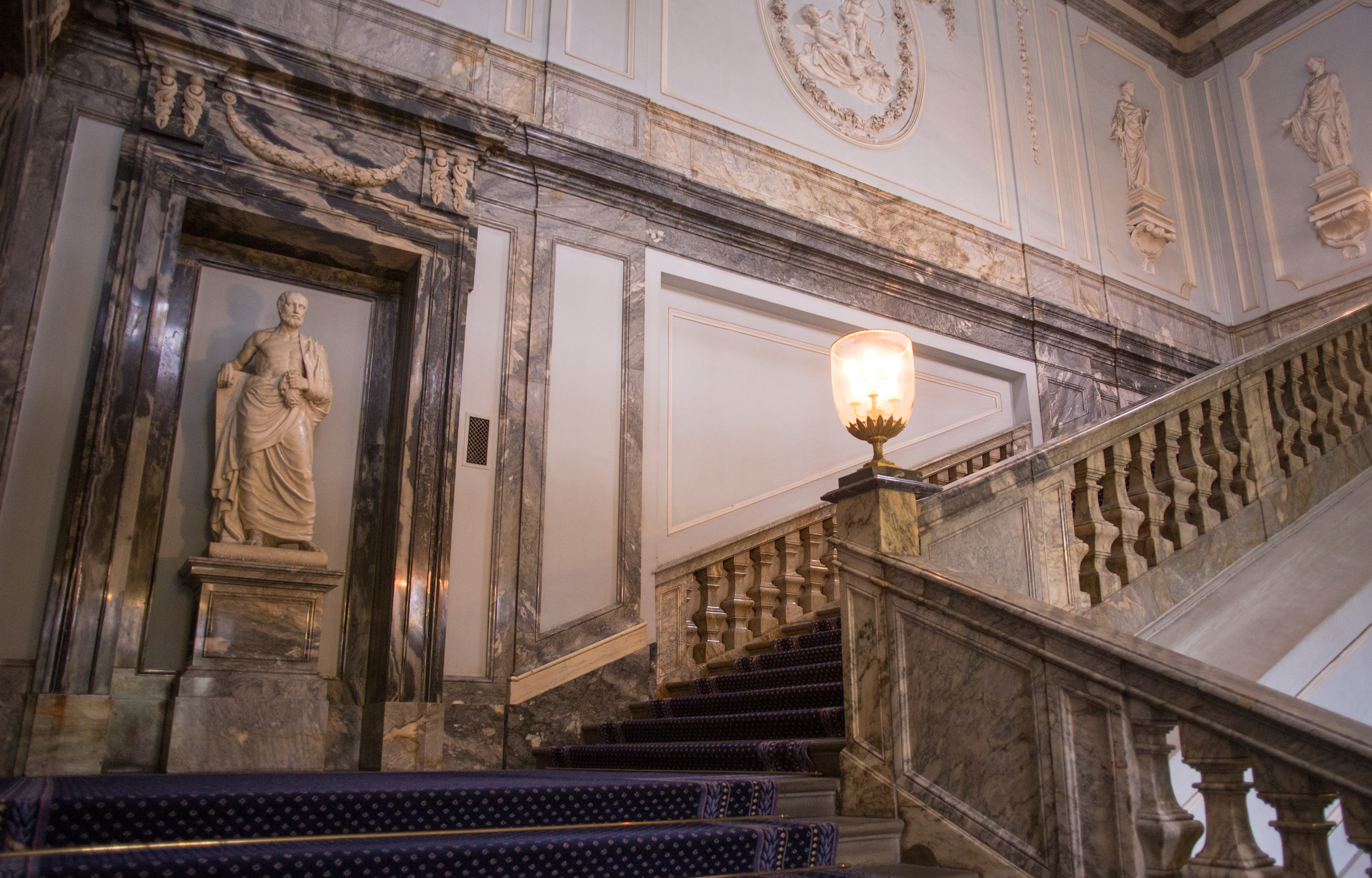
