= Hakeem =

Hakeem is an Arabic-language given name, a romanization variant of Hakim. It is also used as a surname. Notable people with the name include:

== Given name ==
- Hakeem Abdul-Saboor
- Hakeem Abdul-Shaheed
- Hakeem Adeniji
- Hakeem al-Araibi
- Hakeem Ali Mohammad
- Hakeem Achour
- Hakeem Araba
- Hakeem Belo-Osagie
- Hakeem Butler
- Hakeem Dawodu
- Hakeem Fateh Mohammad Sehwani
- Hakeem Femi Gbajabiamila
- Hakeem Jeffries
- Hakeem Kae-Kazim
- Hakeem Kashama
- Hakeem Khaaliq
- Hakeem Manzoor
- Hakeem Muhammad Akhtar
- Hakeem Muhammad Saeed
- Hakeem Muri-Okunola
- Hakeem Nicks
- Hakeem Noor-ud-Din
- Hakeem Odoffin
- Hakeem Olajuwon
- Hakeem Oluseyi
- Hakeem Rizwan Hafeez Malik
- Hakeem Shaker
- Hakeem Valles
- Hakeem Yasin

== Surname ==
- Amer Hakeem
- Ayman Hakeem
- Rauff Hakeem
- Yusuf Hakeem
- Zayn Hakeem

== Fictional characters ==
- Hakeem Lyon

== See also ==
- Hakim (disambiguation)
- Abdul Hakim
