= Akeem =

Akeem is a name of Arabic origin, being a variation of Hakeem, and commonly used in Africa and among the African diaspora. Persons with the name Akeem include:

- Akeem Adams (1991–2013), Trinidadian footballer
- Akeem Anifowoshe (1968–1994), Nigerian boxer
- Akeem Auguste (born 1989), American football player
- Akeem Ayers (born 1989), American football player
- Akeem Bostick (born 1995), American baseball player
- Akeem Davis (born 1989), American football player
- Akeem Davis-Gaither (born 1997), American football player
- Akeem Dent (born 1987), American football player
- Akeem Dodson (born 1987), American cricketer
- Akeem Foster (born 1987), Canadian football player
- Akeem Garcia (born 1996), Trinidadian footballer
- Akeem Haynes (born 1992), Canadian sprinter
- Akeem Hunt (born 1993), American football player
- Akeem Jordan (born 1985), American football player
- Akeem Latifu (born 1989), Nigerian footballer
- Akeem Omolade (born 1983), Nigerian footballer
- Akeem Priestley (born 1985), Jamaican footballer
- Akeem Richmond (born 1991), American basketball player
- Akeem Shavers (born 1990), American football player
- Akeem Spence (born 1991), American football player
- Akeem Thomas (born 1990), Antiguan footballer
- Akeem Vargas (born 1990), German basketball player
- Hakeem Olajuwon (born 1963), Nigerian-American basketball player born Akeem Olajuwon
- One Man Gang (born 1960), American professional wrestler, also appearing as "Akeem the African Dream"

== Fictional characters ==
- Akeem Joffer, the protagonist of the films Coming to America and its sequel, played by Eddie Murphy

== See also ==
- Akim
