= Mikhail Kozlovsky =

Russian sculptor (1753–1802)

- Михаил Иванович Козловский
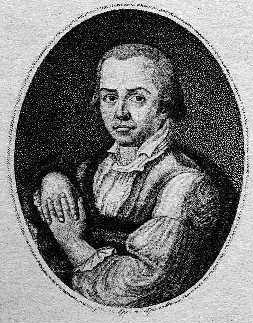
- Mikhail Kozlovsky (1790-1800s)
- Born: October 26, 1753; Saint Petersburg, Russian Empire
- Died: September 18, 1802 (aged 48); Saint Petersburg, Russian Empire
- Education: Member Academy of Arts (1794); Professor by rank (1799)
- Alma mater: Imperial Academy of Arts (1773)
- Known for: Sculpture
- Awards: Big Gold Medal of the Imperial Academy of Arts (1773)

Mikhail Ivanovich Kozlovsky (Russian: Михаил Иванович Козловский; 6 November 1753 – 30 September 1802) was a Russian Neoclassical sculptor active during the Age of Enlightenment.

== Biography ==
Beginning his training at the Imperial Academy of Arts with Anton Losenko in 1764, he went to Rome in 1774 and then to Paris in 1779. Although his early works harked back to the Baroque sensibility, Kozlovsky eventually succeeded in adapting his manner to Neoclassical monumentality. In 1788, he returned to Paris with the task of superintending Russian students abroad. He was appointed a professor at the Academy of Arts in 1794 and instructed young sculptors in St Petersburg until his death.

Among his classicizing works was the awesome gilt bronze statue of Samson Rending the Lion's Jaws (1800–1802), a central piece of the Grand Cascade at Peterhof Palace, symbolizing Russia's victory over Sweden in the Great Northern War. After it was looted by the invading Germans, a replacement statue was installed in 1947. Another masterpiece is the Suvorov Monument, an expressive bronze sculpture of Generalissimo Alexander Suvorov in the guise of youthful Mars. It was unveiled in the Field of Mars (Saint Petersburg) a year before the sculptor's death.

== Works ==
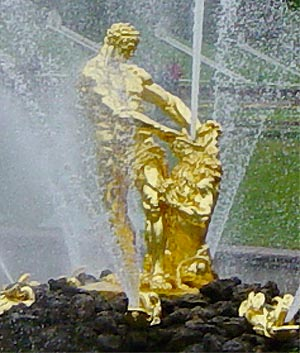
The sculpture of Samson in the central fountain of Peterhof Park

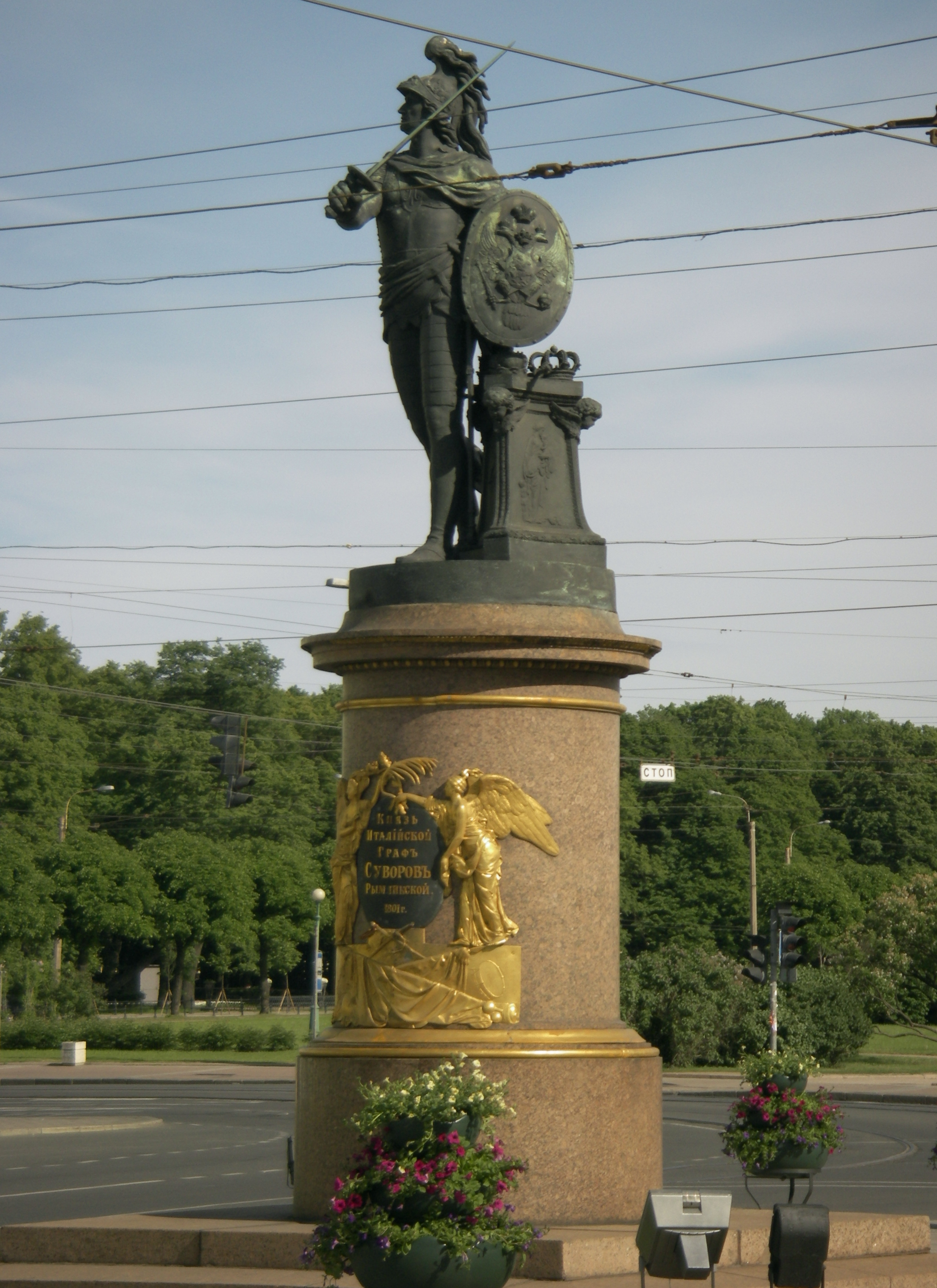
Suvorov Monument: Alexander Suvorov as youthful Mars, Saint Petersburg (1799—1801)

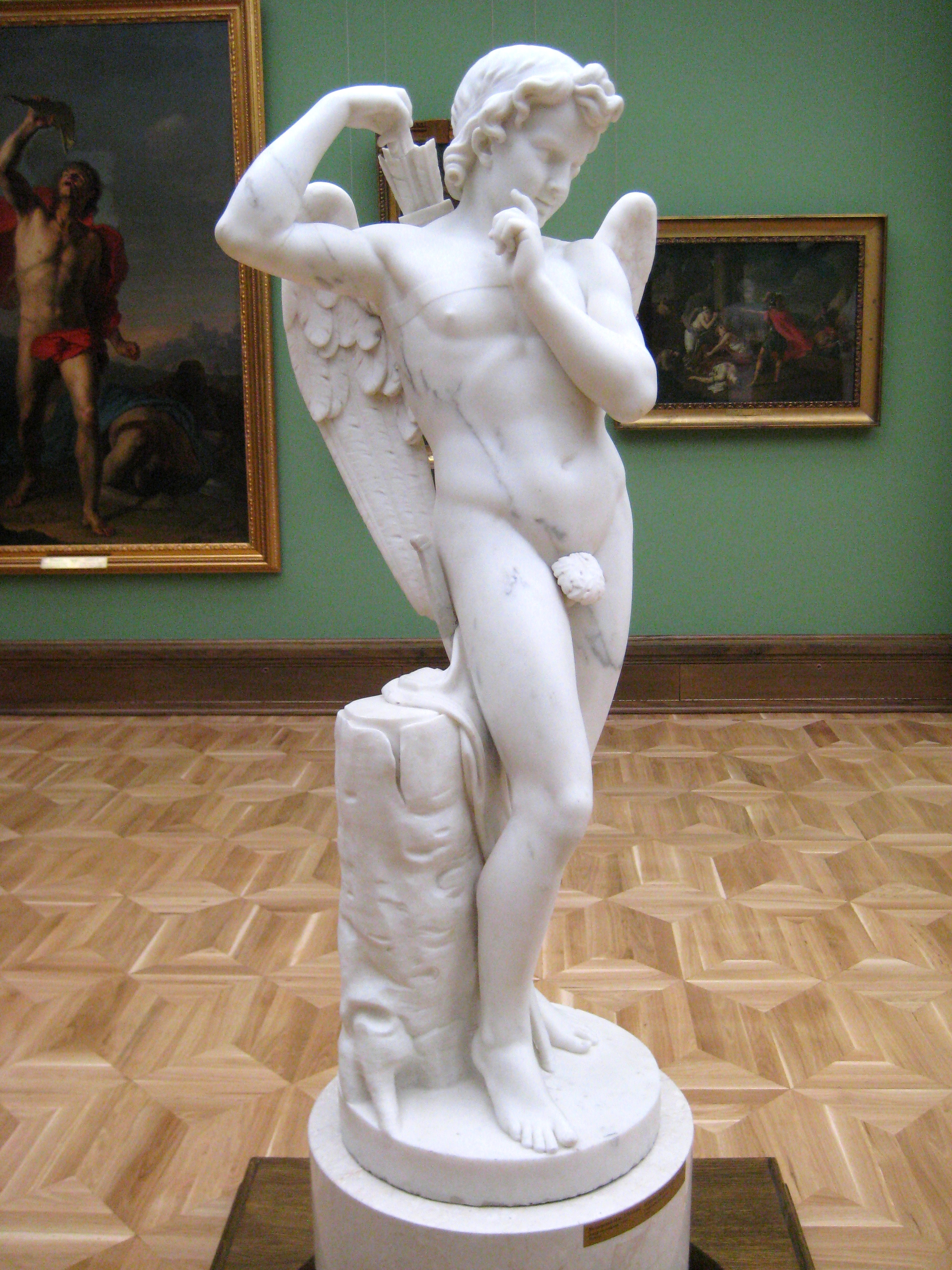
Eros (1797)

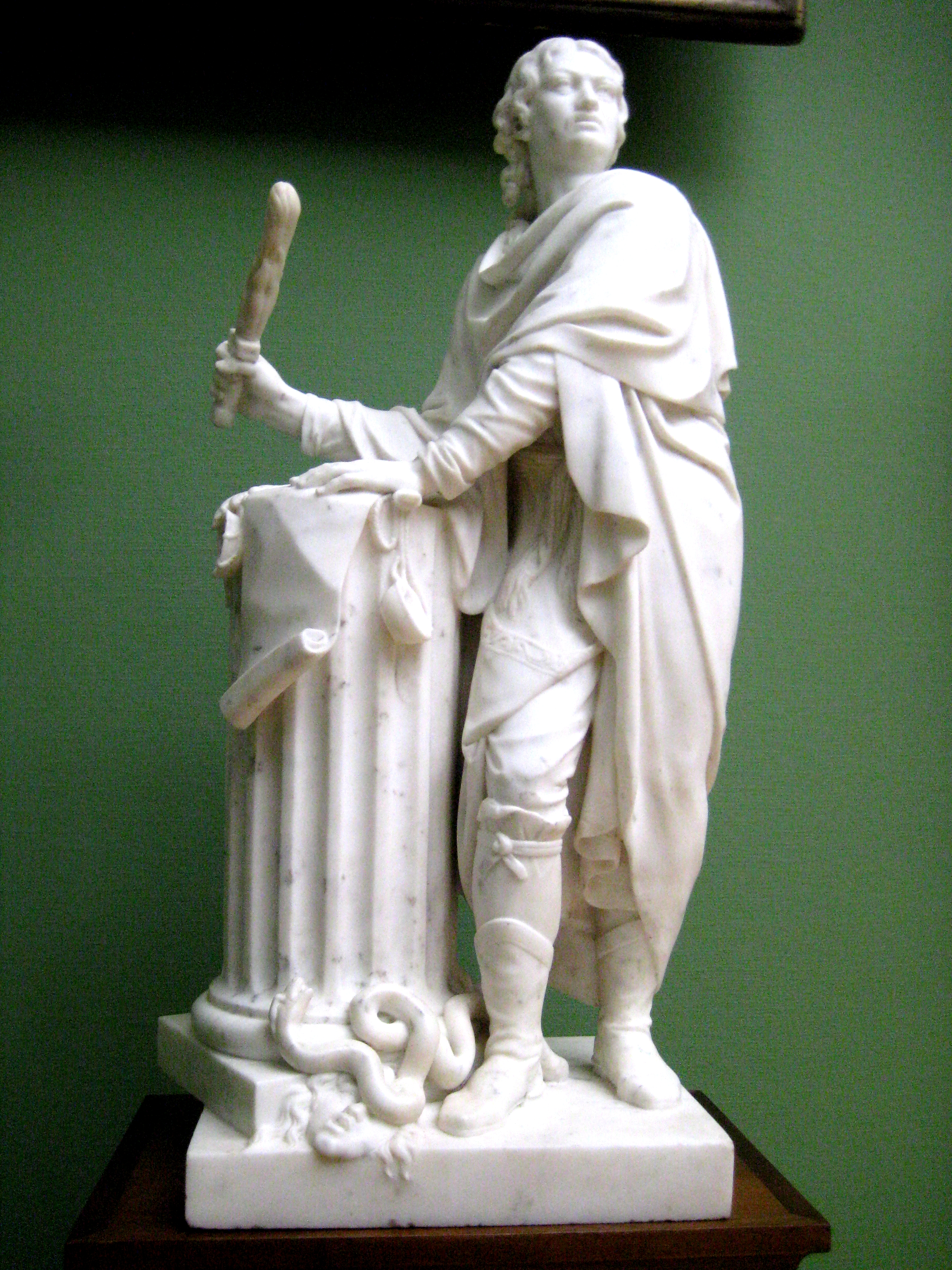
Jacob Dolgoruky, burning royal decree (1796)

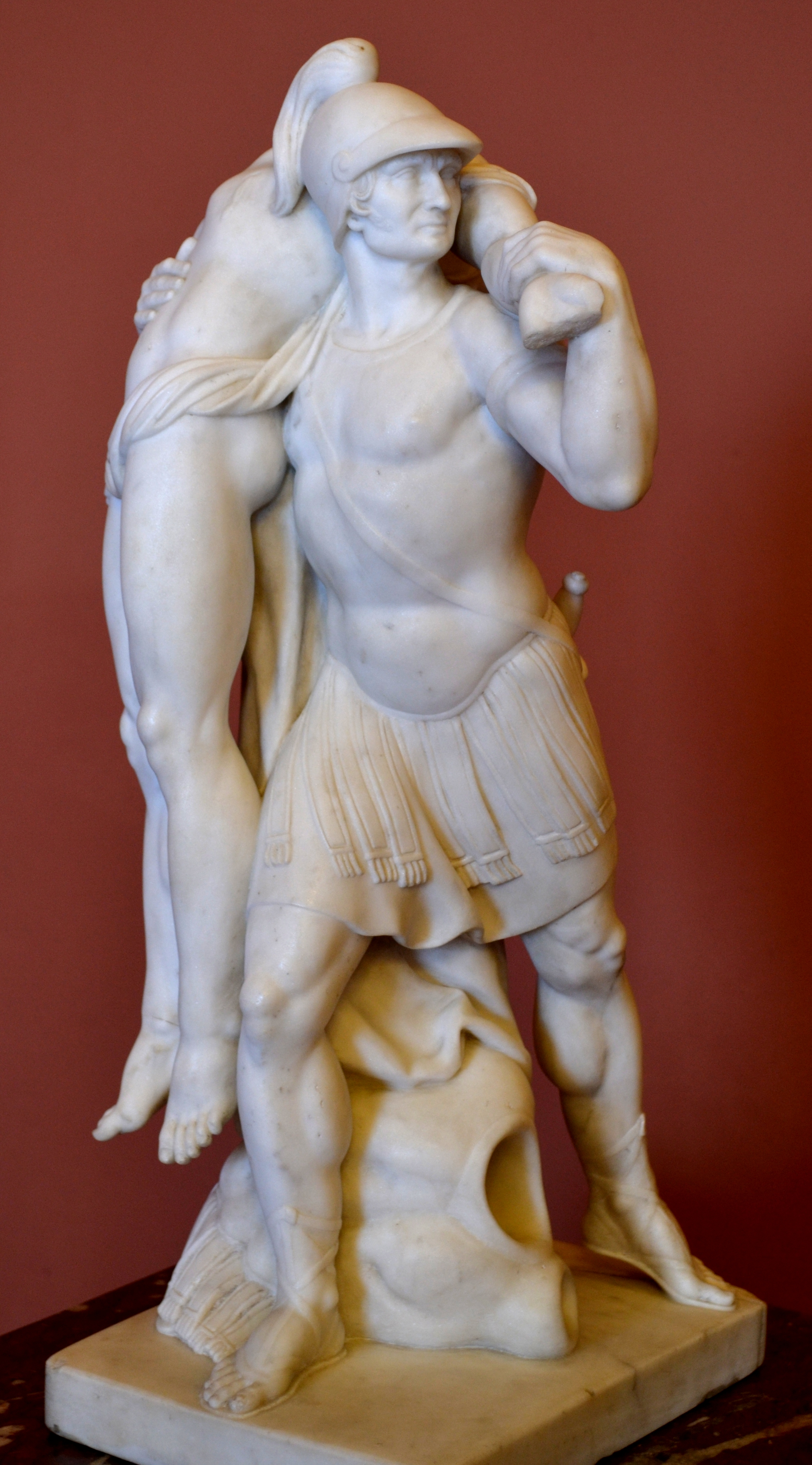
Ajax protects the body of Patroclus

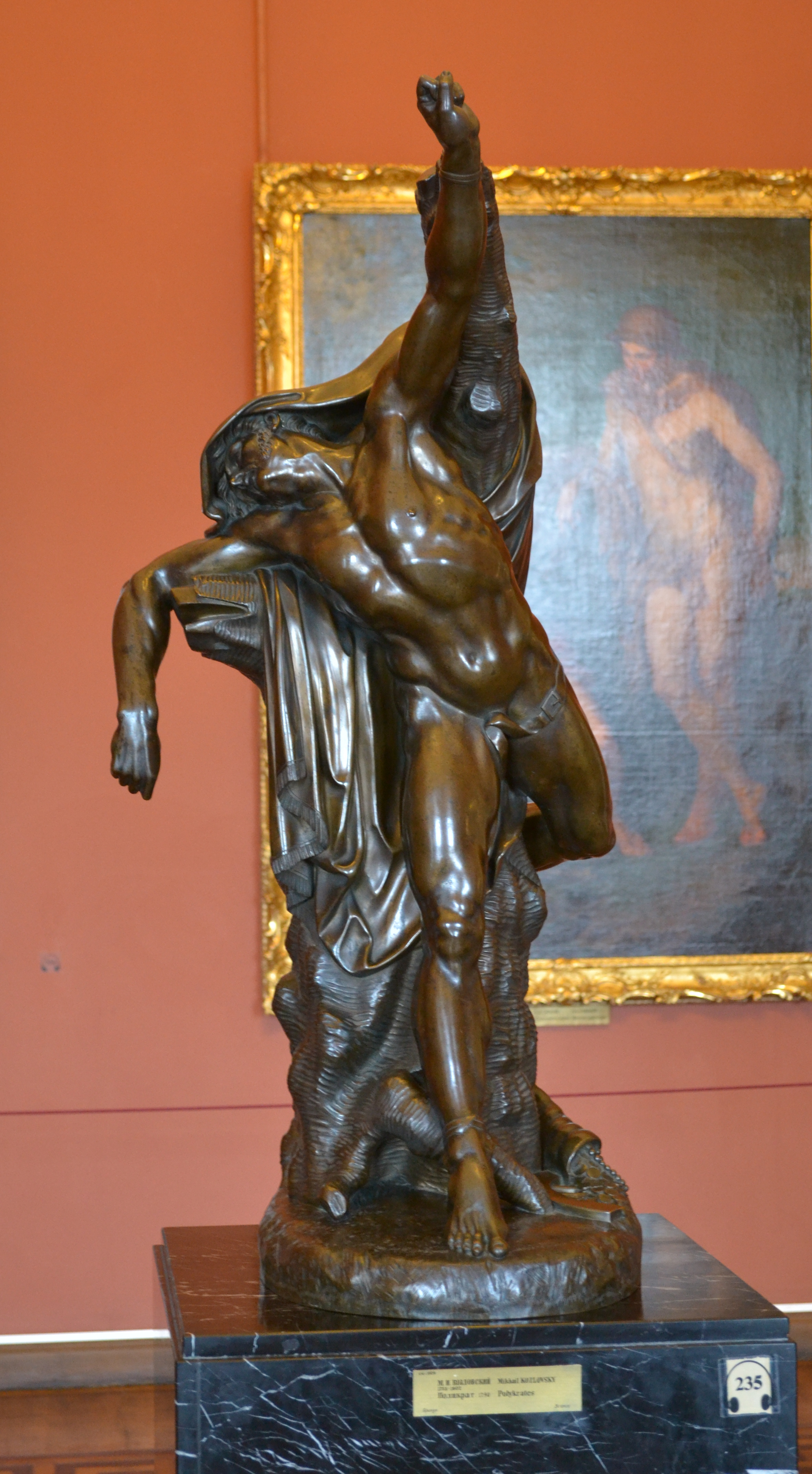
Polycrates (1790)

== Bibliography ==
- С. Н. Кондаков (1915). Юбилейный справочник Императорской Академии художеств. 1764-1914 (in Russian). Vol. 2. p. 258.
