= Hakim =

Hakim, Muhammad-Al-Hakim or Muhammad-Al Hakim may refer to:

- Al-Ḥakīm (Arabic: الحكيم), one of the names of God in Islam, meaning "The All-Wise"
- Hakim (title), two Arabic titles: Ḥakīm, a learned person or physician; and Ḥākim, a ruler, governor or judge.

== People ==
- Hakim (name), an Arabic masculine name, including a list of people bearing this name.
- Hakim (singer) is an Egyptian shaabi singer.
- Al-Hakim al-Nishapuri (933–1014), Persian Sunni scholar and a Muhaddith, frequently referred to as the "Imam of the Muhaddithin" or the "Muhaddith of Khorasan."
- Al-Hakim bi-Amr Allah (996–1021), sixth Fatimid caliph in Egypt and 16th Ismaili imam
- George Habash (1926–2008), also known as "Al Hakim", Palestinian Marxist revolutionary and physician

== Other uses ==
- Hakim Rifle, an Egyptian rifle
- Hakim Stout, a beer made in Ethiopia by Harar Brewery
- Hakim Expressway, Tehran, Iran

== See also ==
- Al-Hakam (disambiguation)
- Joaquim and Joaquin, Portuguese and Spanish names sometimes pronounced similarly
- Hakeem
