= Lower Swan Bridge =

Bridge in Saint Petersburg, Russia

Lower Swan Bridge Нижний Лебяжий мост
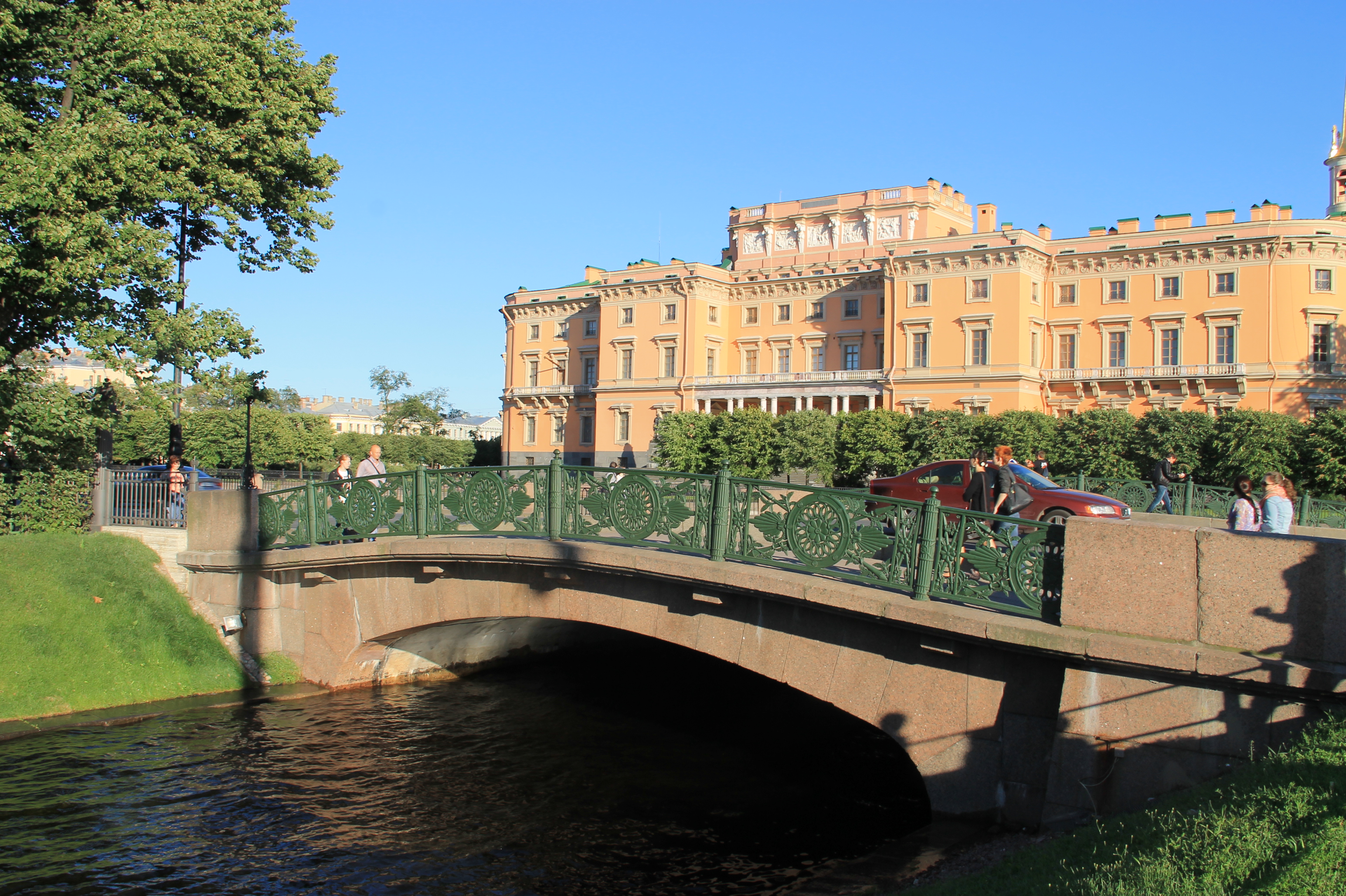
- Coordinates: 59°56′29″N 030°20′09″E
- Carries: Vehicles; Pedestrians
- Crosses: Swan Canal
- Locale: Saint Petersburg

Characteristics
- Total length: 23.9 m (78 ft)
- Width: 19.9 m (65 ft)

History
- Opened: 1733 (in wood); 1837 (in stone)

Lower Swan Bridge (Russian: Нижний Лебяжий мост) is a single-span stone bridge in Saint Petersburg crossing the Swan Canal at its junction with the Moyka River.

The bridge is one of two which cross the Swan Canal, the other being the Upper Swan Bridge at the canal's northern end, at the confluence with the Neva River. The site of the Lower Swan Bridge was originally occupied by a wooden drawbridge built to the design of Harmen van Bol'es in the 1730s, replaced by a fixed bridge by 1760, and for a time known as the First Tsaritsyn Bridge, after the Tsaritsyn Meadow, now the Field of Mars. The wooden bridge was replaced with a stone one in the 1830s, but the speed of its construction led to significant problems, with the vaulting in danger of collapse. Numerous repairs and renovations have taken place over the bridge's existence, before finally being given a degree of stability after work in the 1920s, which retained the original appearance. Further restoration took place in 2002. Today the bridge links the Field of Mars with the Summer Garden at the Swan Canal's junction with the Moyka, close to the Mikhailovsky Castle.

== Location and design ==
The Lower Swan Bridge is in Dvortsovy Municipal Okrug, part of the Tsentralny District of the city. It crosses the Swan Canal, one of the city's oldest, at the point at which the canal joins the Moyka River, connecting the areas of the Field of Mars to the west and the Summer Garden to the east. It comprises a single-span arched stone construction 23.9 m (78 ft) long and 19.9 m (65 ft) wide, and carries both foot and vehicle traffic. It is one of two bridges that currently span the Swan Canal, the other being the Upper Swan Bridge at the northern end of the canal at its juncture with the Neva River.

== History ==
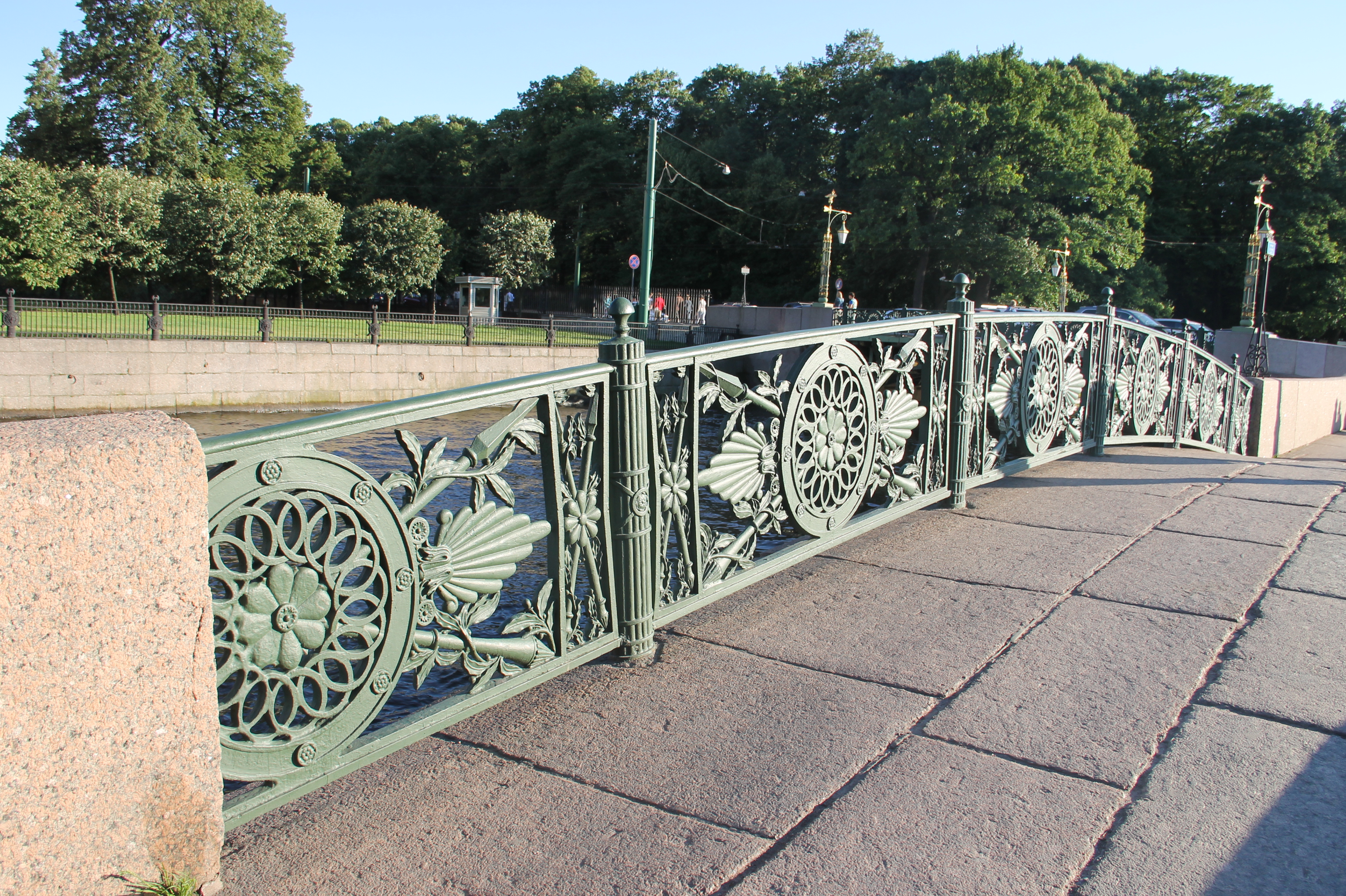
Iron latticework of the bridge's railings

The point at which the Swan Canal diverged from the Moyka River was first crossed by a wooden drawbridge built to the design of engineer Harmen van Bol'es, and in existence between 1720 and 1733. It comprised a beam system with supports on a pile foundation. The supports and superstructure were covered with boards painted to resemble stone. It was called the First Tsaritsyn Bridge after the Tsaritsyn Meadow, now the Field of Mars.^{[a]} It was replaced with a fixed wooden bridge by the 1760s. The wooden crossing was replaced with a stone and brick one over six months between December 1836 and mid-1837, as part of the redevelopment of the area around the Mikhailovsky Castle. Engineers Pierre-Dominique Bazaine, Andrei Gotman and A. I. Remezov were responsible for the design of the single-span brick-vaulted arched bridge, with its facades and pillars lined with granite, and cast-iron railings designed by Carlo Rossi. Prior to this the bridge had had several names, including the Swan Bridge, the Lower Swan Bridge, and the Wooden Swan Bridge, the latter name to distinguish it from the bridge across the northern end of the canal, which had been a stone construction since 1768. After being rebuilt in stone, the name Lower Swan Bridge took precedence, distinguishing it from the northern bridge, which became the Upper Swan Bridge.

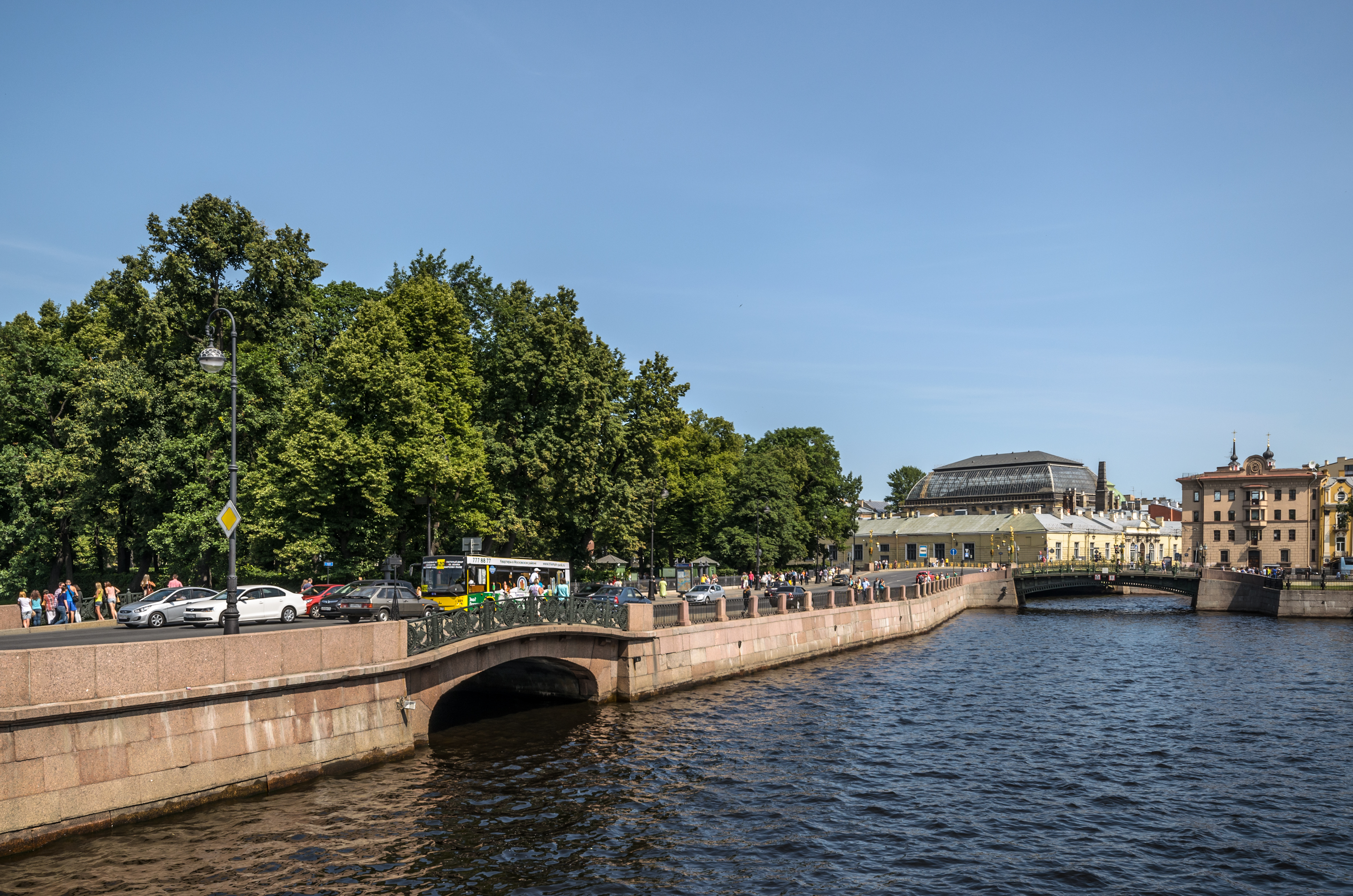
The bridge from the Moyka, showing the junction with the Swan Canal

The haste in which the bridge was constructed soon began to show. The brick vault of the bridge cracked almost immediately after completion, with the crack widening steadily over the next six years. By 1842 the gap had widened to 25 cm (9.8 in), causing seams to open in the bridge's foundations. Attempts were made to fill the gaps with copper wedges, but by 1846 all the wedges had fallen out and the bridge was crumbling, pieces falling into the water at the slightest vibration. A repair plan was drawn up by March 1847, but failed to solve the problems, with new defects being found in the repair works. In 1849 the arch collapsed, necessitating further repairs. Defects were again discovered in the vaulting in the early 1900s, and a 1904 examination declared the condition of the bridge unsatisfactory. In 1907, another reconstruction project was drawn up, proposing the fitting of lattice metal trusses. Neither this nor several subsequent repair programmes were implemented, and the bridge continued to collapse.

By the early 1920s the condition of the bridge was causing serious concern, and it was closed to traffic in 1924. It was again repaired between April 1925 and 1926 under the oversight of engineers B. D. Vasilyev and A. L. Salarev. The structure was strengthened with reinforced concrete and lined with granite, retaining the earlier appearance of the bridge, including Rossi's railings, which were restored. Another restoration took place in 2002 as part of the 300th anniversary of the founding of the city. Waterproofing was carried out, the railings were restored and the roadway and pavements repaired.

== Notes ==
a. The Second Tsaritsyn Bridge is now the First Sadovy Bridge.
