= Hermanus (name) =

Hermanus is a Latinized version of the Germanic masculine given name Herman. It and its less common variant Hermannus have been used in the Low Countries and South Africa as a birth name. Most people use a short form, like Herman, Harm, Harmen, and Manus. Hermanus also is a patronymic surname in South Africa. People with the name include:

== As a Latinized name ==
- Hermannus Alemannus (died 1272), German bishop in Spain and translator of Arabic philosophical works into Latin
- Hermannus Contractus (1013–1054), German scholar, composer, music theorist, mathematician, and astronomer
- Hermannus Dalmata (c.1100–1160), Istrian philosopher, astronomer, astrologer, mathematician, translator and author
- Hermannus de Wartberge (died c.1380), Livonian chronicler
- Hermannus Witsius (1636–1708), Dutch theologian

== As a birth name ==
- Hermanus Angelkot (1688–1727), Dutch pharmacist, poet and playwright
- Hermanus Hendrikus Baanders (1849–1905), Dutch architect
- Hermanus Berserik (1921–2002), Dutch painter and print maker
- Hermanus Beukes (1913–2004), Namibian politician and activist
- Hermanus Blom (1885–1963), Dutch actor, screenwriter and playwright known as Herman Bouber
- Hermanus Brockmann (1871–1936), Dutch rower
- Hermanus Brood (1946–2001), Dutch musician and painter.
- Hermanus van Brussel (1763–1815), Dutch landscape painter and etcher
- Hermanus Jacob Coster (1865–1899), Dutch lawyer and Second Boer War lieutenant
- Hermanus Johannes de Graaf (1899–1984), Dutch historian of Java
- Hermanus Haga (1852–1936), Dutch physicist
- Hermanus P. J. B. Heinsbroek (born 1951), Dutch Minister of Economic Affairs
- Hermannus Höfte (1884–1961), Dutch rower
- Hermanus Koekkoek (1815–1882), Dutch landscape painter
- Hermanus Willem Koekkoek (1867–1929), Dutch military scenes painter
- Hermanus Ellen Mees (1880–1964), Dutch painter, draftsman, and lithographer
- Hermanus Meyer (1733–1791), German-born clergyman of the Dutch Reformed Church in America
- Hermanus Numan (1744–1820), Dutch painter, draftsman, and publisher
- Hermanus J.A.M. Schaepman (1844–1903), Dutch priest, politician and poet
- Hermanus Eliza Verschoor (1791–1877), Dutch liberal politician
- Hermanus L. W. Vrauwdeunt (1915–1982), Dutch footballer
- Hermanus van Wyk (1835–1905), South African Baster settler in Namibia

== As a surname ==
- Grant Hermanus (born 1995), South African rugby player
- Kartini Hermanus (1949–2021), Indonesian military officer
- Oliver Hermanus (born 1983), South African film director and writer

== See also ==
- Hermanus, a town in South Africa named after the Dutch teacher Hermanus Pieters
- Hermanus Magnetic Observatory, a research facility near that town
- Harmanus
