= Upper Swan Bridge =

Bridge in Saint Petersburg, Russia

Upper Swan Bridge Верхний Лебяжий мост
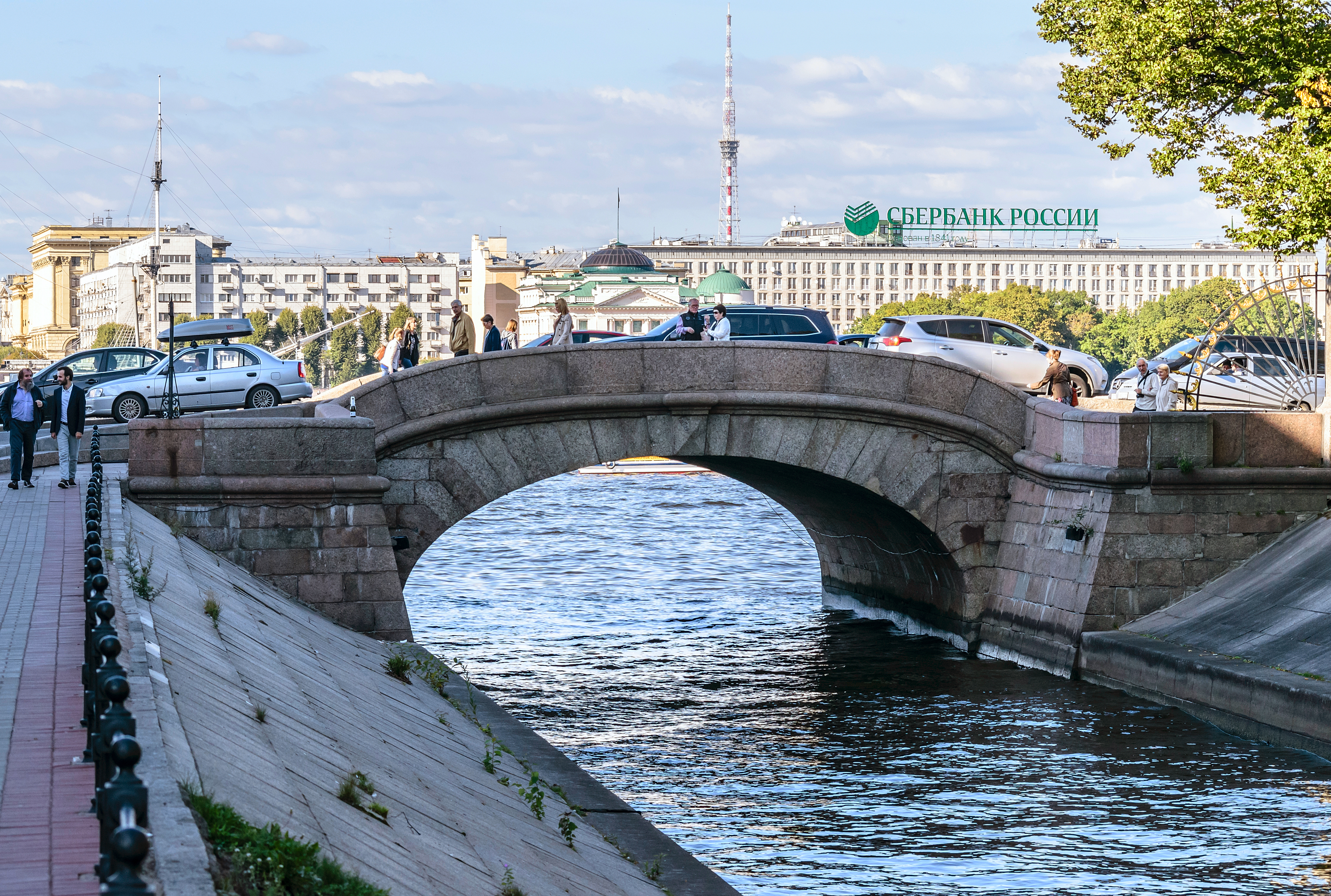
- Coordinates: 59°56′52″N 030°20′11″E
- Carries: Vehicles; Pedestrians
- Crosses: Swan Canal
- Locale: Saint Petersburg

Characteristics
- Total length: 12.5 m (41 ft)
- Width: 14.9 m (49 ft)

History
- Opened: 1711-1715 (in wood); 1768 (in stone)

Location
- Interactive map of Upper Swan Bridge

Upper Swan Bridge (Russian: Верхний Лебяжий мост) is a single-span stone bridge in Saint Petersburg. It is one of the oldest stone bridges in the city and carries Palace Embankment across the Swan Canal.

The preceding bridge on the site was of wooden construction, built in the 1710s over the Lebedinka, a shallow watercourse flowing between the Moyka and Neva Rivers, at the point at which it entered the Neva. With the construction of the Swan Canal replacing the Lebedinka, the bridge continued to operate, until being replaced with a stone bridge in 1768. The bridge was alternately known as the Swan Bridge, the Stone Swan Bridge, and finally the Upper Swan Bridge, distinguishing it from the Lower Swan Bridge at the southern end of the canal at its juncture with the Moyka. Structural faults were identified as early as the mid-nineteenth century, but repairs were only carried out in the 1920s. These left the appearance of the bridge unaltered, and it still retains its original form. It has been designated an object of historical and cultural heritage of federal significance.

== Location and design ==
The Upper Swan Bridge is in Dvortsovy Municipal Okrug, part of the Tsentralny District of the city. It crosses the Swan Canal, one of the city's oldest, at the point at which the canal joins the Neva River, and carries Palace Embankment between the areas of the Field of Mars to the west, and the Summer Garden to the east. It comprises a single-span arched stone construction 12.5 m (41 ft) long and 14.9 m (49 ft) wide, and carries both foot and vehicle traffic. It is one of two bridges that currently span the Swan Canal, the other being the Lower Swan Bridge at the southern end of the canal at its juncture with the Moyka River. Despite several restorations, its appearance has remained almost unchanged from its construction in stone in 1768 to the present day. It is one of the oldest stone bridges in the city.

== History ==
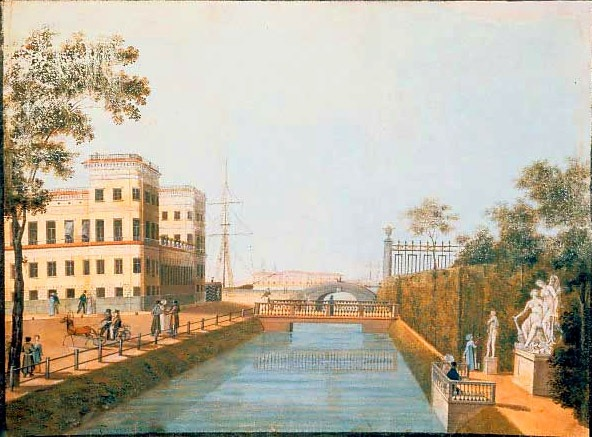
The view north along the Swan Canal. The Upper Swan Bridge and the junction with the Neva are visible beyond a wooden bridge that has not survived to the present day. An 1839 work by Ivan Belonogov.

Over the course of the eighteenth century four different wooden bridges spanned the Swan Canal. The Upper Swan Bridge began as a wooden construction across the Lebedinka, a shallow watercourse, at the point it enters the Neva. It was built between 1711 and 1715, and was named the Swan Bridge. The wooden bridge was replaced in 1768 by a single-span stone bridge, with construction overseen by engineer T. I. Nasonov.^{[a]} This was part of a larger scale overhaul of the embankments along the Neva, which saw them reinforced with granite. As designed the supporting pillars and arch of the bridge were of rubble slab lined with granite, with the parapets of solid granite. The abutments were fitted with gas lanterns, but these were removed at some point, presumably by the late nineteenth century.

At some point between 1836 and 1846 the bridge was renamed the Stone Swan Bridge, with the terms Upper and Lower Swan Bridges being in use since at least 1849 to distinguish the bridges at the northern and southern end of the canal respectively. Surveys of the Upper Swan Bridge between 1840 and 1845 revealed movement in the bridge supports and the deformation of its arched vault. Proposals were drawn up for a reconstruction of the bridge in 1847, which envisaged its replacement with a brick arch raised a metre above the river level. This proposal was never implemented, and a similar proposal by engineer K. V. Yefimev in 1908 ultimately came to nothing.

The bridge finally underwent repairs between 1927 and 1928, with the fitting of monolithic reinforced concrete by engineer L. A. Krushelnitsky, and the restoration of its granite cladding in 1931. These repairs were carried out with the object of retaining the bridge's design and architectural appearance. Further restoration was carried out in 2003 as part of a general series of works on the canal. Cracks in its foundations were repaired. The bridge has been described as uniting Palace Embankment and the fence of the Summer Garden into a single architectural ensemble, and has been designated an object of historical and cultural heritage of federal significance."

== Notes ==
a. Different sources attribute the design to either Yury Felten or I. G. Rossi.
