= Harmen =

Harmen is a Dutch variation of the masculine given name Herman. A common short form is Harm. People with the name include:

- Harmen Abma (1937–2007), Dutch Frisian abstract and conceptual artist
- Harmen van Bol'es (1689–1764), Dutch architect, royal master builder in Russia
- Harmen Bussemaker (born 1968), Dutch and American biological physicist
- Harmen Fraanje (born 1976), Dutch jazz pianist and composer
- Harmen Harmense Gansevoort (c.1634–1709), New Netherland settler, brewer and landowner
- Harmen Hals (1611–1669), Dutch portrait painter, son of Frans Hals
- Harmen de Hoop (born 1959), Dutch protest artist
- Harmen Jansen Knickerbocker (c.1648–c.1720), Dutch colonist in New Netherland
- Harmen Kuperus (born 1977), Dutch footballer
- Harmen Liemburg (born 1966), Dutch graphic artist
- Harmen Siezen (1940–2025), Dutch journalist and presenter
- Harmen Steenwijck (c.1612–aft.1656) Dutch still life painter
- Harmen van Straaten, Dutch author and illustrator
