= Swan Canal =

Canal in Saint Petersburg

Swan Canal Лебяжья канавка (Russian)
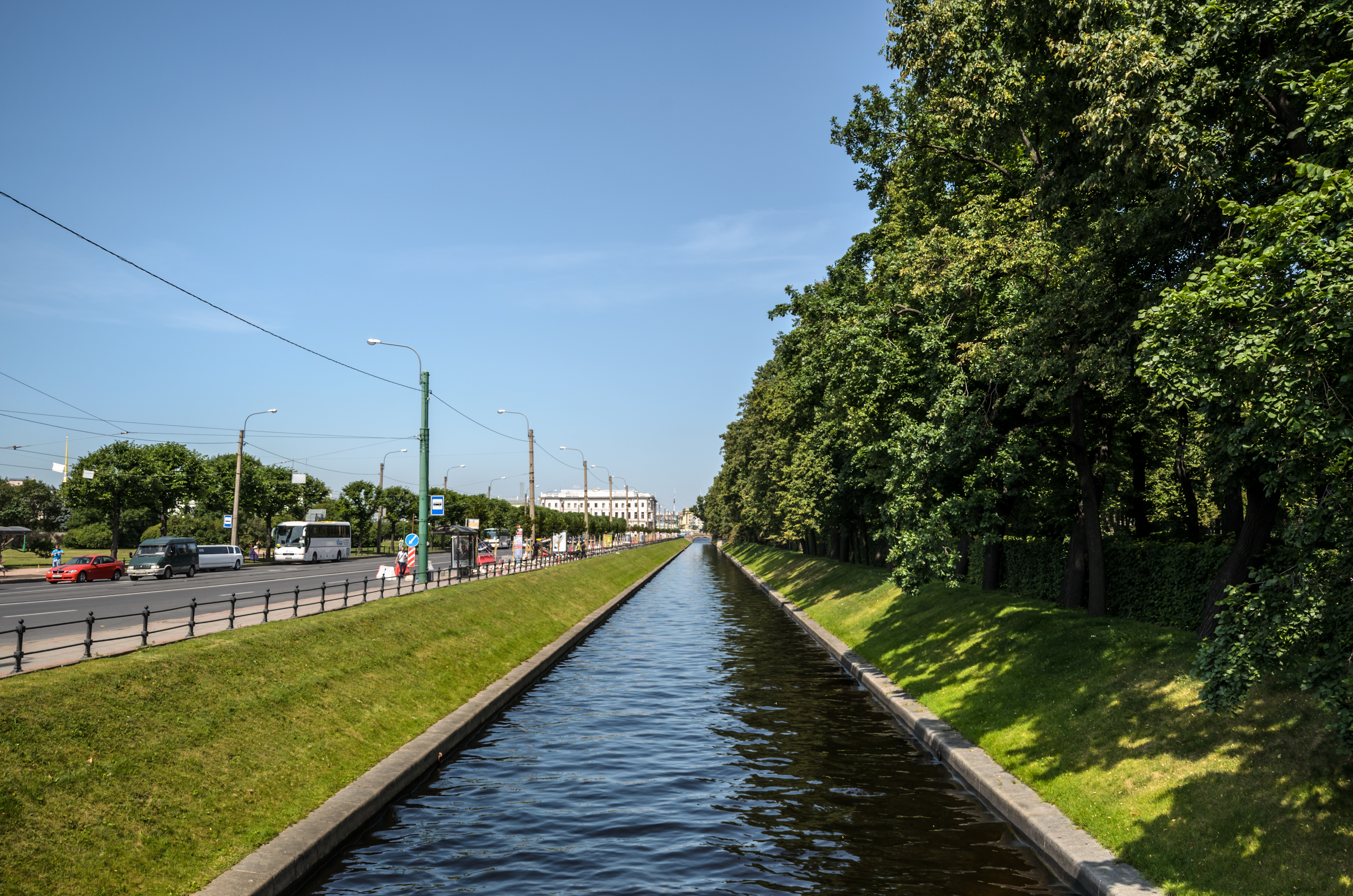
- Country: Russia

Specifications
- Length: 0.648 km (0.403 miles)

Geography
- Start point: Moyka
- End point: Neva
- Beginning coordinates: 59°56′29″N 30°20′10″E
- Ending coordinates: 59°56′49″N 30°19′56″E

The Swan Canal (Russian: Лебяжья канавка) is a waterway located in Saint Petersburg. Dating from the early years of the foundation of the city, it connects the Moyka and Neva Rivers.

Originally built as part of a system of drainage channels and canals, the Swan Canal replaced a shallow river that flowed between the Summer Garden and the area that became known as the Field of Mars. The canal was dug between 1711 and 1719, and was known as the Summer Canal or Summer Garden Canal. In later years it became a popular habitat for swans, from which it eventually took its name. The canal has undergone repairs and reconstruction over its existence, deepening the channel, and replacing wooden banks with granite. Today it is used by small pleasure boats, and is crossed by two bridges, one of which, the Upper Swan Bridge, is one of the city's oldest stone bridges.

== Location and characteristics ==
The Swan Canal is in Dvortsovy Municipal Okrug, part of the Tsentralny District of the city. It connects the Moyka River to the south, carrying water north to the Neva River, into which it empties. It divides the Summer Garden to the east from the Field of Mars to the west. It is 648 m (2,126 ft) long, 8 m (26 ft) wide and 1 m (3.3 ft) deep. Two bridges span the canal, the Upper Swan Bridge, at the northern end of the canal at its confluence with the Neva, and the Lower Swan Bridge at the southern end, where it branches from the Moyka. Today it is one of the oldest canals in the city, and is used by small pleasure boats.

== History ==
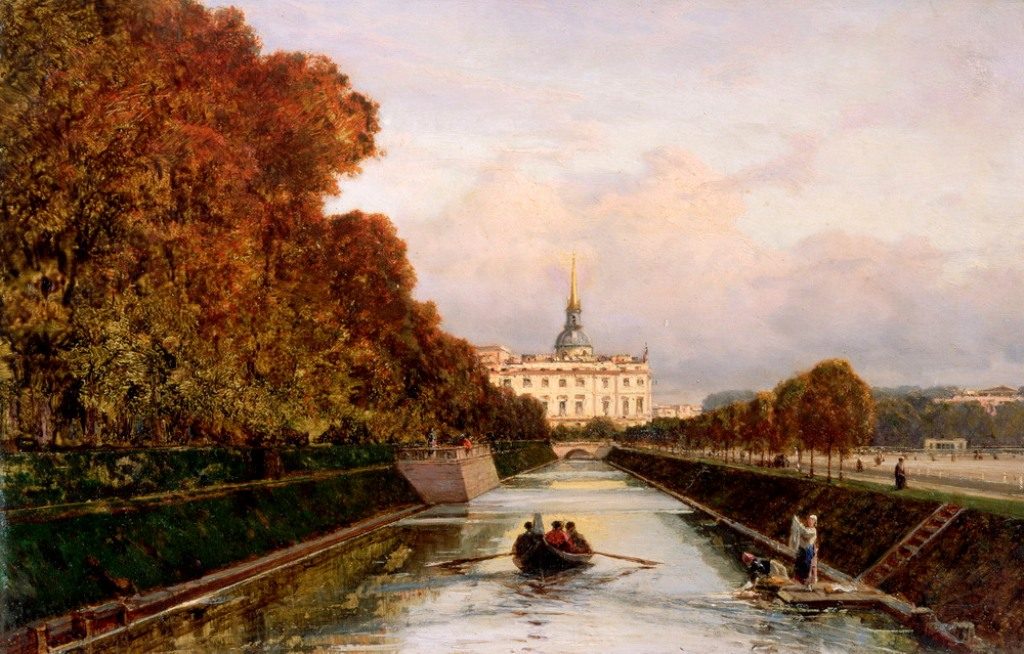
The view south along the Swan Canal, towards the Mikhailovsky Castle, 1880s, by Alexey Bogolyubov

The site of the canal was previously occupied by a shallow swampy river, the Lebedinka (Russian: Лебединка), flowing between the Moyka and the Neva Rivers. Between 1711 and 1719, as part of measures to drain the land now occupied by the Field of Mars, it was cleaned, deepened and renamed the Summer Canal (Russian: Летний канал) or the Summer Garden Canal (Russian: канал Летнего сада), after the Summer Garden, which lies alongside the canal's eastern bank. The Red Canal was dug to the west of the Field of Mars, also with the purpose of draining the land. The sides of the canal were reinforced with wooden piles, and possibly also lined with wooden railings about this time, as a 1761 document refers to their repair.

Sometime after this, the Summer Canal was settled and became a habitat for swans from the nearby Summer Garden, and the canal became known as the Swan Canal. By the 1730s the canal was crossed by at least four wooden bridges, and in 1733 its banks were reinforced with wood. In 1799 the eastern bank, alongside the Summer Garden, was strengthened with a stone terrace to the design of Grigory Pilnikov, and a pier was also constructed, decorated with iron vases by architect Carlo Rossi.

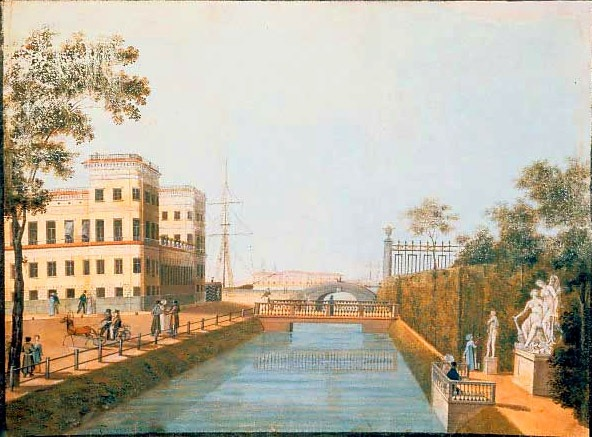
The view north towards the Upper Swan Bridge and the junction with the Neva, 1839, by Ivan Belonogov

In 1823, as part of the redevelopment of the land around the Field of Mars and the Mikhailovsky Palace, Sadovaya Street was extended up to the eastern edge of the Field of Mars, joining the pathway running parallel to the Swan Canal, and connecting with Millionnaya Street, which crossed the field's northern boundary. In 1824 the terrace was destroyed in a flood, and had to be restored, with stone balusters replaced with a cast-iron openwork grille.

Expansion across the meadow's Neva frontage continued in the 1780s with the construction of the service wing of the Marble Palace, and the Betskoy and the Saltykov Mansions. The Betskoy Mansion, now the home of the Saint Petersburg State Institute of Culture, was built between 1784 and 1787 by Jean-Baptiste Vallin de la Mothe, stands on the west bank of the canal, close to the Upper Swan Bridge. The canal's banks were reinforced in 1934, though a similar strengthening project planned for 1941 had to be cancelled after the Axis invasion of the Soviet Union. Further work on the structure of the canal was carried out between 1953 and 1956, involving deepening it, facing the banks with granite, and landscaping the slopes with earth. In 1997 the walkway beside the canal embankment was repaired, trees planted, and new fences installed.

=== Bridges ===
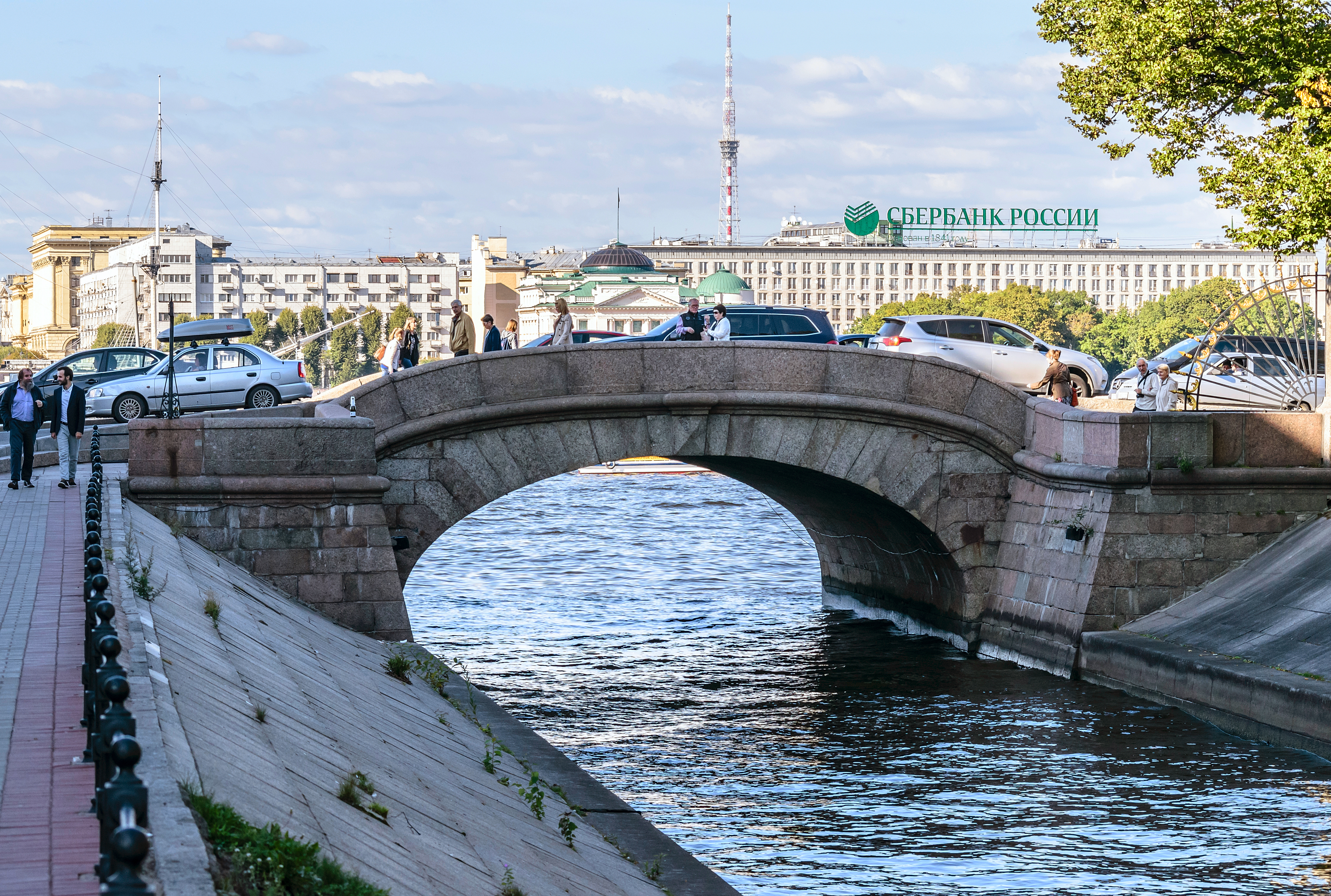
The Upper Swan Bridge and the confluence of the Swan Canal and the Neva

The Upper Swan Bridge began as a wooden bridge across the Lebedinka at the point it enters the Neva. It was built between 1711 and 1715, and was named the Swan Bridge. It was replaced in 1768 by a single-span stone bridge designed by Yury Felten. It underwent repairs between 1927 and 1928, and again in 1931 and in 2003. The Upper Swan Bridge is one of the oldest stone bridges in the city. A wooden drawbridge to the design of engineer Harmen van Bol'es was built between 1720 and 1733 at the confluence with the Moyka river, and named the First Tsaritsyn Bridge, after the Tsaritsyn Meadow, now the Field of Mars. It was replaced by a single-span stone bridge built between 1835 and 1837, named the Lower Swan Bridge, as part of the redevelopment of the area around the Mikhailovsky Castle. It was repaired in 1849, and further reconstructed between 1925 and 1926.
