= Bussemaker =

Bussemaker is a surname. Notable people with the surname include:

- Carel Hendrik Theodoor Bussemaker (1864–1914), Dutch historian
- Harmen Bussemaker (born 1968), Dutch and American biological physicist and professor
- Jet Bussemaker (born 1961), Dutch politician
