= Harmanus =

Harmanus is a masculine given name. Notable people with the name include:

- Harmanus Bleecker (1779–1849), American attorney, politician and ambassador
  - Harmanus Bleecker Library, Albany, New York, United States
- Harmanus B. Duryea (1815–1884), American lawyer, politician, and militia officer
- Harmanus Peek (1782–1838), American lawyer and politician
- Harmanus Uppink (1765–1791), Dutch painter

== See also ==
- Harman
- Hermanus (name)
