= Potseluev Bridge =

Bridge in Saint Petersburg, Russia

Potseluev Bridge Поцелуев Мост
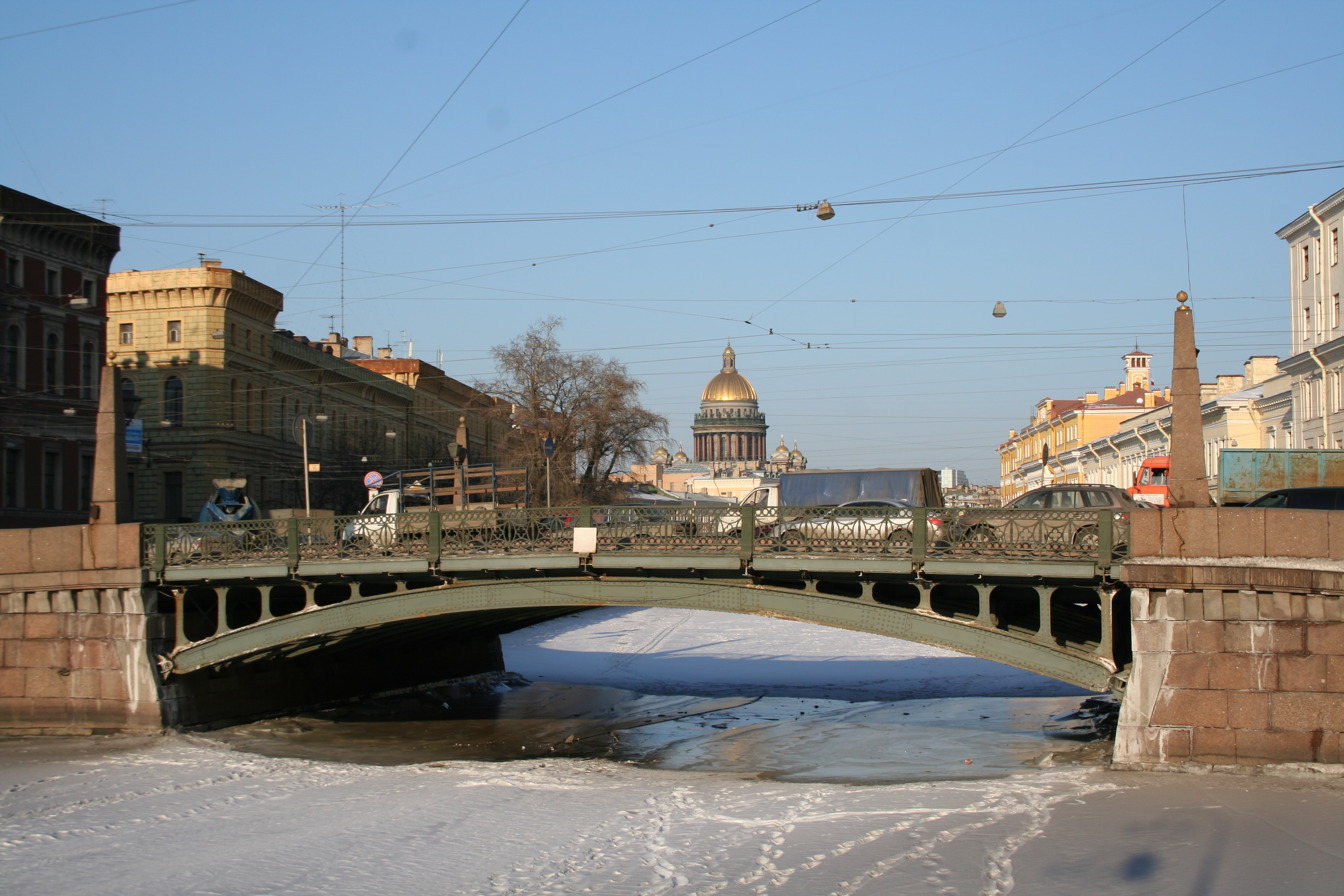
- Coordinates: 59°55′42″N 30°17′42″E
- Crosses: Moyka River
- Locale: Saint Petersburg

Characteristics
- Design: Arch Bridge
- Total length: 41.5 meters
- Width: 23.5 meters

History
- Opened: 1738 (wooden); 1768 (traffic); 1808 (cast iron)

Location
- Interactive map of Potseluev Bridge; Поцелуев Мост

The Potseluev Bridge (Russian: Поцелуев мост, literally Bridge of Kisses) is a bridge across the Moyka River in Saint Petersburg, Russia. The name of the bridge spurred numerous urban legends. The panoramic view of Saint Isaac's Cathedral that opens from the bridge makes it a popular subject of artists paintings.

== Name and history ==
During the first half of the 18th century, townspeople had set up a crossing across the Moyka river from improvised materials at the location of the modern bridge. In 1738 while the granite embankment of Moyka was being established, the wooden pedestrian bridge was built. It had a raising part to allow passage of mast ships. The wooden bridge was painted in different colours, and therefore was named Coloured Bridge. In 1768 the bridge was reconstructed to accommodate horse traffic. At this time the structure was changed to three-span bridge standing on stone supports. The bridge was named after merchant Potseluev who kept a tavern near the bridge. Local urban folklore links the bridge (whose name literally means Bridge of kisses) with good luck omens (lovers are advised to kiss on the bridge to have a long and happy relationship, often the bridge is visited by newlyweds, and so on).

At the beginning of the 19th century a bridge no longer met the increased traffic loads, and therefore in 1816 it was rebuilt. The new bridge was built to the design of architect William Heste as a single span arched bridge. Like other Heste's bridges, it was made from iron cast with granite facing.

Entrance to the bridge features four granite obelisk with lanterns.

Fence pattern repeats the one from the Moyka River embankments. It was made at the Petersburg iron factory.

The first major renovation was made after heavy floods in 1824 and which nearly destroyed the bridge completely.

In 2024, a bus fell into the Moyka river from the bridge, killing 7 people.

== Gallery ==
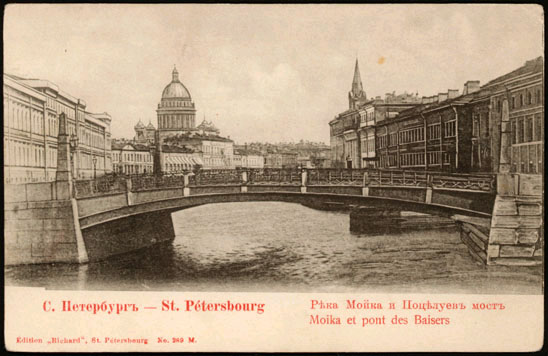
19th-century postcard

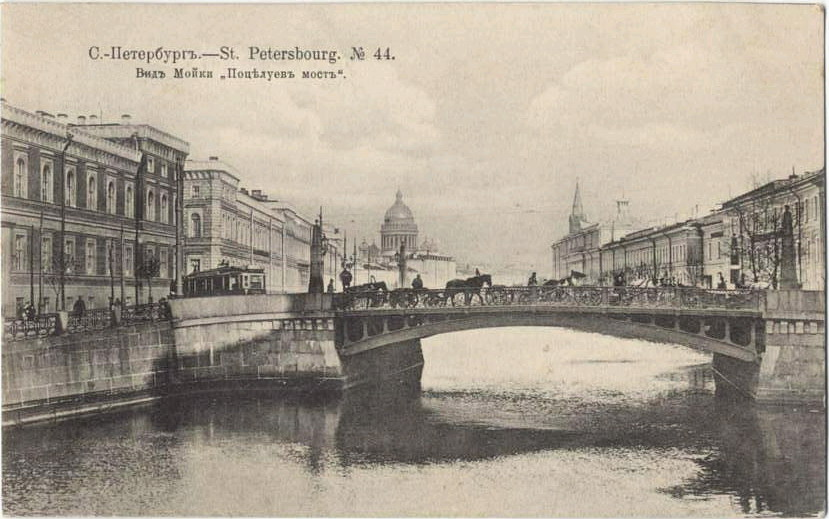
1914 postcard

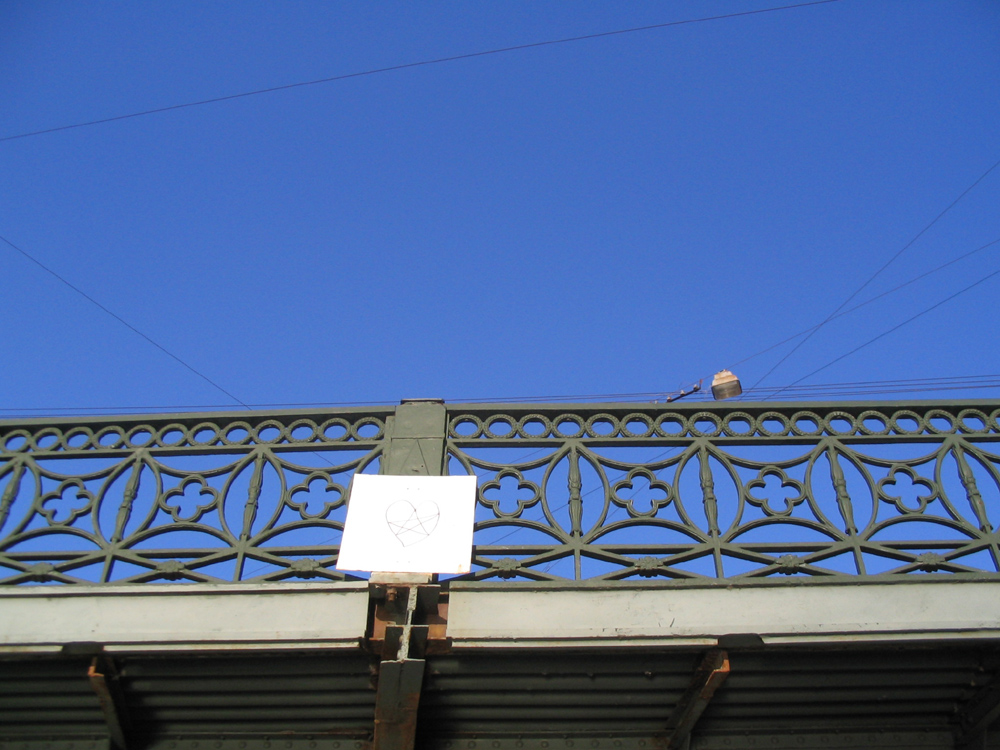
Bridge handrail
