= Harmen de Hoop =

Dutch artist (born 1959)

- Notable work: Basketball court #7 (1992), Sandbox (1996), Speed limit #1 (2008)
- Style: Interventions, Actions, Street Art

Harmen de Hoop (born 1959) is a Dutch artist known for his anonymous and illegal interventions in public space. They are small, yet very direct actions that react to the manner in which urban space is used and the regulations that have been laid down for those who use it. His works often address the lack of freedom that the individual has when it comes to the way public space is allowed to be used and the over-regulation of society. With his interventions he breaches the systems and brings forward another, often humane perspective. With this he tries to let people look at themselves in a different way, often with a sense of humor.

== Work ==
=== Early work ===
From 1984 till 1986 he worked in abandoned buildings. Entering them without permission and using the walls as his canvas, adding photocopies and paint. He would photograph the resulting combination of his additions and the existing 2D- and 3D elements of the space. From 1987 till 1991 he made interventions in waiting rooms, shops, cafeterias and other semi public spaces. He would ask permission to make an intervention using self-adhesive tape. When finished the proprietor had the choice to keep it or to have it removed.

=== Interventions in public space ===
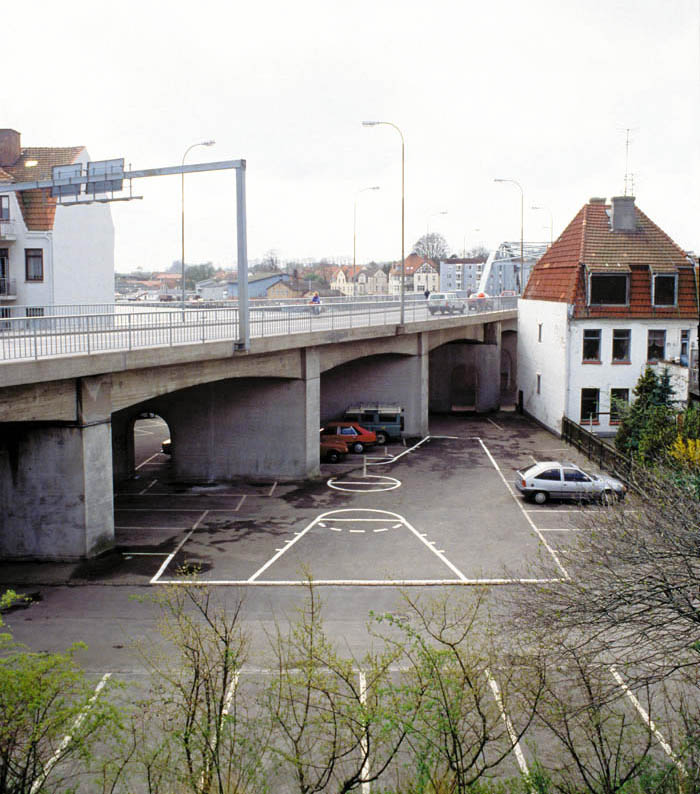
Basketball court #7 in Sønderborg, 1992

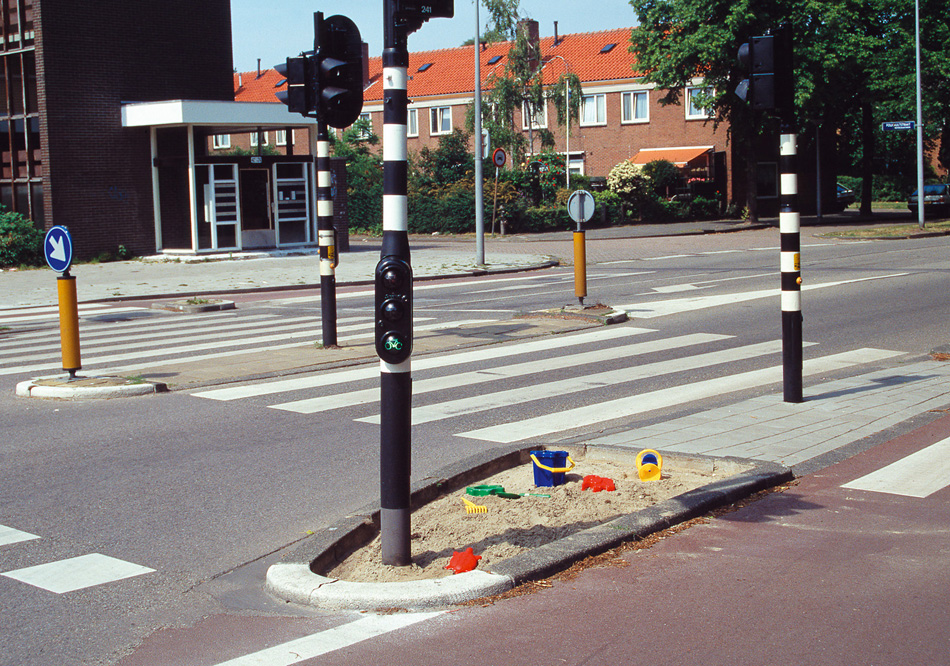
Sandbox in Amsterdam, 1996

In 1992, De Hoop shifted his activities out of doors and became a pioneer of a new form of ‘street art’. Inspired by artist like Keith Haring and Charles Simonds, who worked in public space without being commissioned to do so, he started to think about the ways in which ‘art in public space’ could be re-defined. He decided to address the passer-by without using the existing language of the art world. His interventions are made by re-contextualizing existing signs or objects, adding them to a location in an unexpected way and by doing so questioning ‘normality’. The work is often about the functionality of materials and objects, or about rules and regulations and the way people behave in the public domain. Before he makes a work he visits and photographs an unlimited number of locations in a chosen city until he finds the right site for his intervention.

=== Actions in public space ===
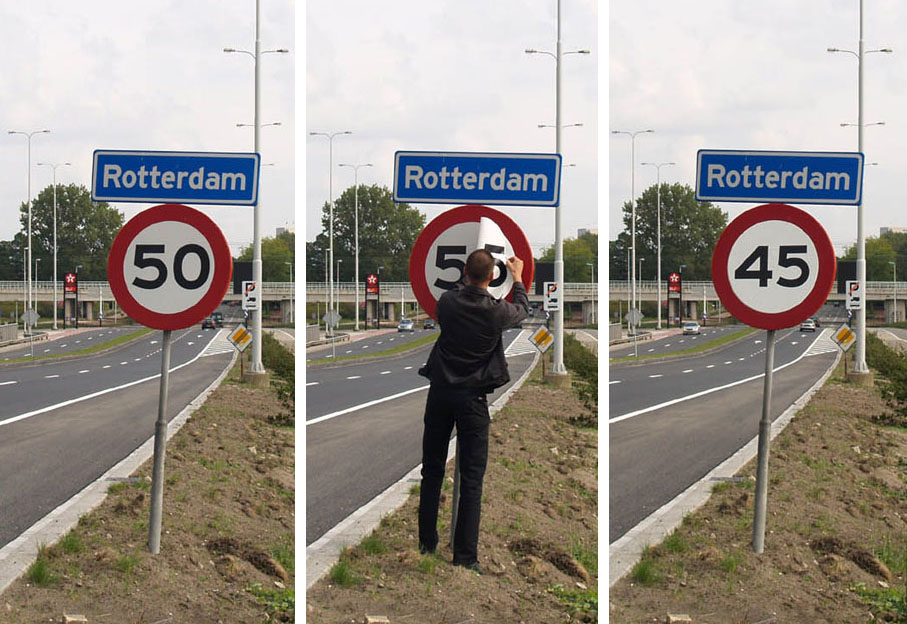
Speed limit #1 in Rotterdam, 2008

From 1998 onwards the majority of his works consist of carefully planned actions in public space. As with his interventions he confronts an unprepared public with actions that comment on social, political and philosophical issues

== Bibliography ==
- 2011: Harmen de Hoop, WEST, ISBN 978-90-79917-04-4
- 2009: Activism Doubt, with Jonas Staal, Onomatopee, ISBN 978-90-78454-36-6
- 1995: Verboden Toegang, ISBN 90-802628-1-1
- 1990: Fotowerken / werk op locatie, ISBN 90-9003297-5
