= Hermanus Meyer =

Hermanus Meyer (born in Bremen, Lower Saxony, 27 July 1733; died near Pompton Township, New Jersey, 27 October 1791) was a clergyman of the Dutch Reformed Church in America around the time of the Revolutionary War.

== Biography ==
He was educated at the Latin school and gymnasium in Bremen, and at the theological academy of Groningen. Having received a call to the Dutch church of Kingston, New York, he was ordained on 31 March 1763, and sailed for New York with Jacob R. Hardenbergh. In 1764 he was compelled by the civil authorities to take the oath of allegiance to Great Britain.

Meyer found the church divided by the old quarrel of the Coetus and Conferentie parties as to whether ordination should take place in this country or in the Netherlands. He sympathized with the Coetus party in favor of a ministry trained in America, and his pungent preaching caused dissatisfaction. The ecclesiastical difficulties culminated in his suspension from active duties by an illegal body of Conferentie ministers in 1766, and for nearly seven years he remained in Kingston, preaching to his adherents in private houses.

He was a member of the convention of 1771, which reunited his church. In 1772, he moved to New Jersey as pastor at Pompton and Totowa (now Paterson). The general synod elected him to two chairs in their theological institution — that of Hebrew in 1784, and that of lector in divinity in 1786, which he held until his death. In 1789 he received the degree of D.D. from Queen's College (now Rutgers). He left in manuscript a Latin translation of the Psalms of David, with commentaries and emendations.

== Family ==
On May 25, 1764, he married Rachel Hardenbergh of Rosendale, New York. They had four children.
