= Harm (given name) =

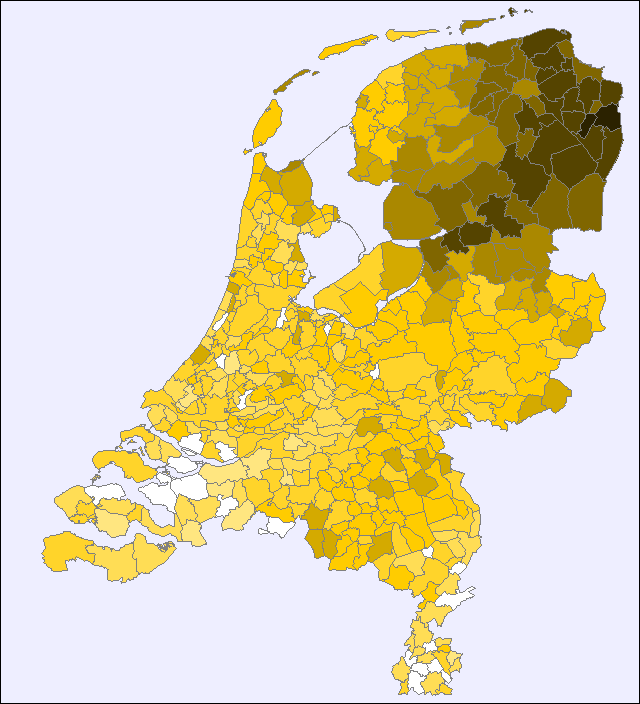

Harm is a Dutch masculine given name. It's a short form of Harmen (Herman) and is most common in the North East of the Netherlands. People with the name include:

- Harm Bart (born 1942), Dutch mathematician and economist
- Harm Beertema (born 1952), Dutch PVV politician
- Harm de Blij (1935–2014), Dutch-born American geographer
- Harm Bouckaert (born 1934), Dutch-American art dealer
- Harm Brouwer (born 1957), Dutch Labour Party politician
- Harm van den Dorpel (born 1981), Dutch conceptual artist in Berlin
- Harm Holman (born 1957), Dutch politician
- Harm van Houten (1892–1952), Dutch journalist and politician
- Harm Jansen (born 1967), Dutch road bicycle racer
- Harm Kamerlingh Onnes (1893–1985), Dutch painter, draughtsman, and ceramist
- Harm Klueting (born 1949), German historian and theologian
- Harm Kolthek (1872–1946), Dutch printer, journalist, trade unionist and politician
- Harm Kuipers (born 1947), Dutch speed skater
- Harm Lagaay (born 1946), Dutch automobile designer
- Harm van der Meulen (1925–2007), Dutch trade unionist and politician
- Harm Osmers (born 1985), German football referee
- Harm Ottenbros (1943–2022), Dutch road bicycle racer
- Harm G. Schröter (born 1948), German economist
- Harm Vanhoucke (born 1996), Belgian road bicycle racer
- Harm van Veldhoven (born 1962), Dutch-Belgian football player and manager
- Harm Wiersma (born 1953), Dutch world champion in draughts
- Harm Zeinstra (born 1989), Dutch footballer

Fictional

- Capt. Harmon "Harm" Rabb, a character on the U.S. TV series JAG
