= Harmen van Bol'es =

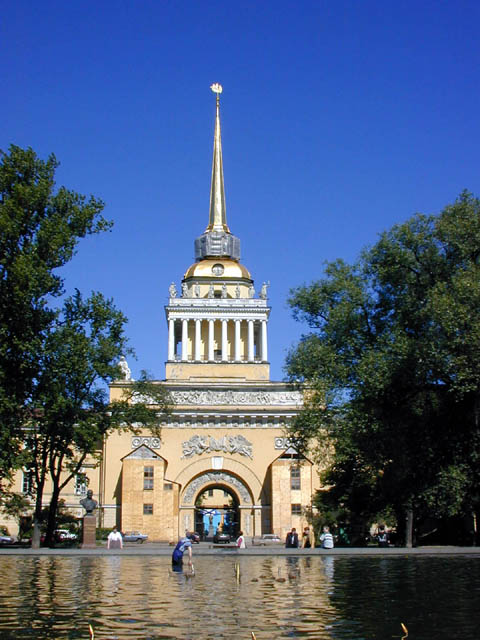
Admiralty Building on the Nevsky Avenue

Harmen van Bol'es (Amsterdam 1689 - Saint-Petersburg 1764) was a royal master builder in Russia.

Harmen's father was the travelling windmill builder, originating from a family of carpenters from South Holland, the Dutch Republic. Grandfather Harmen established himself as a carpenter in the village Bolnes, the origin of the family name. When Cornelis was appointed Town Carpenter in Schiedam in 1690 the family moved there. In his youth Harmen was taught by his father, the City Architect, but he did not follow in his footsteps; his younger brother, Arij van Bol'es became City Architect in 1724. This function was filled by his descendants until 1827.

On 26 April 1713 Harmen van Bol'es signed a contract in The Hague entering into the service of Tsar Peter the Great of Russia. In 1703 Tsar Peter had established Saint Petersburg at the mouth of the Neva River. This proposed new capital was to become the modern window on the western world but in 1713 it was not much more than a mud pool. Design and construction required skilled westerners including those from the much admired by the Tsar, Republic of the Seven United Netherlands. The difficult and dangerous work was primarily performed by Russian forced labour.

Symbol of St Petersburg based on the wind vane on the Admiralty building designed by van Bol'es

Van Bol'es soon became a success in Saint Petersburg thanks in part to the friendship and patronage of his old Swiss colleague Domenico Trezzini. Along with furniture (based on the original repertoire of his forefathers) for the royal palaces he also designed and built many structures in the city. Amongst these were typical Dutch specialities such as drawbridges, sluices, windmills and canals. He enhanced the Summer Gardens with fountains which were fed by a complex network of underground water tanks. He was also involved in large infrastructure projects around Saint Petersburg.

In modern Saint Petersburg he is most famous for the tower spires he specialised in, including the spires of the Peter and Paul Fortress. The wind vane in the form of a ship designed by van Bol'es shines on top of the thin spire of the Admiralty Building on the Nevsky Prospect, the city's main street. The three-masted ship has become an emblem of the city of Saint Petersburg and is said to represent the Russian frigate Oryol.

Harmen van Bol'es married twice and fathered at least twelve children in Saint Petersburg. His oldest son Cornelis, from his first marriage to Elisabeth Geldorp, returned to Schiedam. His second son Anthony was appointed as royal servant (probably in a construction capacity) of the court in Moscow. He died there in 1746. In a reference from 1750 Harmen is named as "her Royal Majesty's Master Builder of Saint Petersburg". The oldest son from his second marriage to Catharina Potter, also Cornelis, appears to have followed in this function after Harmen's death in 1764. Cornelis (the younger) van Bol'es died in Saint Petersburg in 1771.
