= Harmen Bussemaker =

Dutch and American biological physicist

Harmen J. Bussemaker
- Born: 1968 (age 57–58); Hengelo, Netherlands
- Education: Utrecht University
- Scientific career
- Fields: Physics
- Workplaces: Columbia University

Harmen J. Bussemaker (born 1968, Hengelo) is a Dutch and American biological physicist, professor at Columbia University, and principal investigator of the Harmen Bussemaker lab.

== Awards ==
- 2010 Guggenheim Fellows
