= Dvortsovy Municipal Okrug =

Dvortsovy Municipal Okrug муниципальный округ Дворцовый
- Municipal okrug
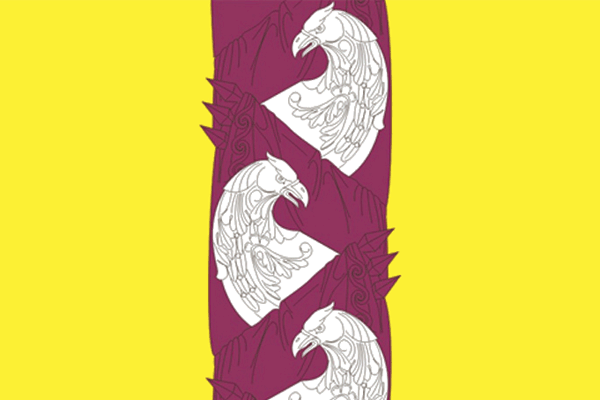
- Flag

- Coordinates: 59.9°N 30.3°E
- Website: https://dvortsovy.spb.ru/

Dvortsovy Municipal Okrug (Russian: муниципа́льный о́круг Дворцо́вый) is a municipal okrug of Tsentralny District of the federal city of St. Petersburg, Russia. Population: 6,426 (2010 census); 10,491 (2002 census).

The okrug borders Nevsky Avenue in the southwest, the Neva River in the north, and the Fontanka River in the east.

Places of interest include Palace Square, Winter Palace, Hermitage Museum, Church of the Savior on Blood, the Field of Mars, Summer Garden, Marble Palace, Arts Square, and the Palace Embankment.
