= Moyka =

River in Russia

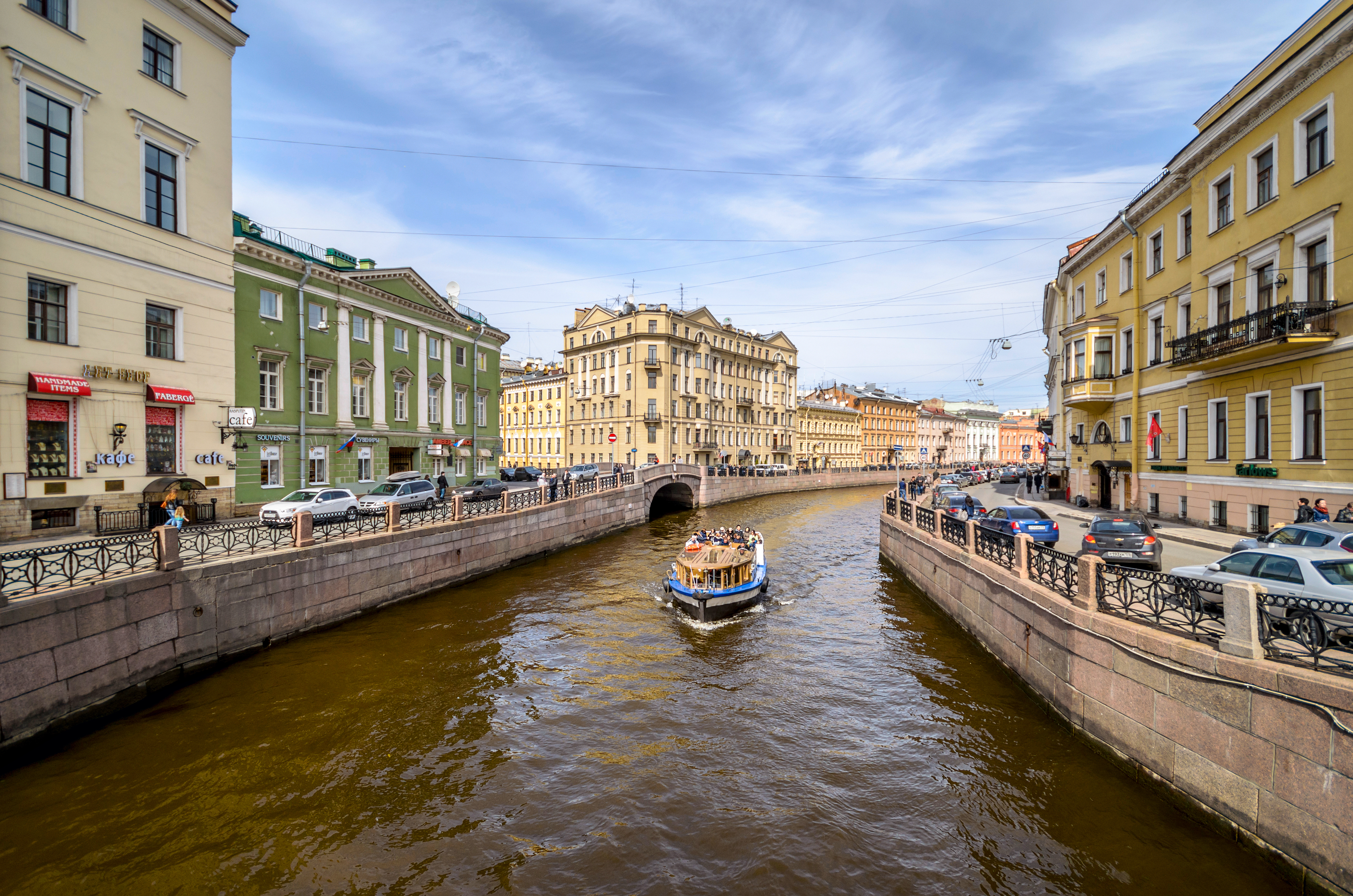
- View of the Moyka from the Pevchesky Bridge

- Location within Central Saint Petersburg
- Native name: Мойка (Russian)

Location
- Country: Russia
- Federal city: Saint Petersburg

Physical characteristics
- Source: Fontanka
  - coordinates: 59°56′30″N 30°20′16″E
- Mouth: Neva
  - coordinates: 59°55′35″N 30°16′25″E
- Length: 4.67 km (2.90 mi)

Basin features
- River system: Neva basin

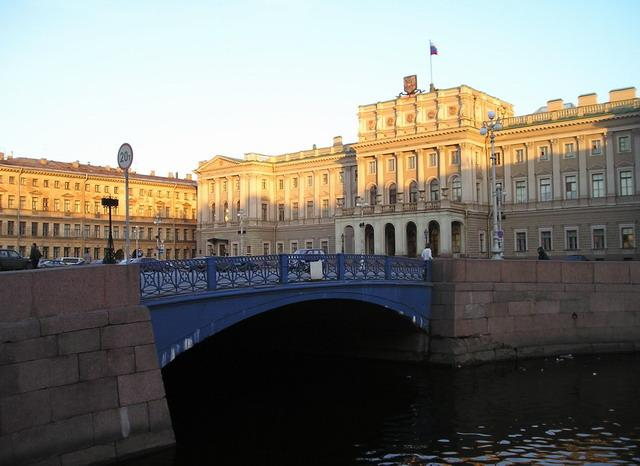
The 99-metre-wide (325 ft) Blue Bridge spans the Moyka in front of the Mariinsky Palace, joining it to the larger part of Saint Isaac's Square with its landmark cathedral of the same name

The Moyka (Russian: Мойка, also latinised as Moika) is a short river in Saint Petersburg which splits from the Neva River. Along with the Neva, the Fontanka river, and canals including the Griboyedov and Kryukov, the Moyka encircles the central portion of the city, effectively making that area an island or a group of islands. The river derives its name from the Ingrian word Muya for "slush" or "mire", having its original source in former swamp. It is 5 kilometres (3 mi) long and 40 metres (130 ft) wide.

The river flows from the Fontanka river, which is itself a distributary of the Neva, near the Summer Garden past the Field of Mars, crosses Nevsky Prospect and the Kryukov Canal before entering the Neva river. It is also connected with the Neva by the Swan Canal and the Winter Canal.

In 1711, Peter the Great ordered the consolidation of the banks of the river. After the Kryukov Canal linked it with the Fontanka River four years later, the river became so much cleaner that its name was changed from Muya to "Moyka", the latter from the Russian verb "to wash". With the spread of cars and services for them in post-Soviet Russia, the Russian word Мойка has become a common sight unconnected to the river as it very often means (car)wash, which may confuse foreign tourists.

In 1736, the first Moyka quay was constructed in wood. Four bridges originally spanned the river: the Blue, the Green, the Yellow, and the Red. The 99-metre-wide (325 ft) Blue Bridge, now hardly visible underneath Saint Isaac's Square, remains the widest bridge in the whole city.

Magnificent 18th-century edifices lining the Moyka quay include the Stroganov Palace, Razumovsky Palace, Yusupov Palace, New Holland Arch, Saint Michael's Castle, and the last accommodation and museum of Alexander Pushkin.

== Bridges ==
As of 2016 15 bridges cross the Moyka. Most of these have historical and artistic interest:

- Green Bridge (Zelyony most, 1806–08, by William Heste)
- Red Bridge (Krasny most, 1808–14, by William Heste)
- Potseluyev Bridge (Potseluyev most, 1808–16, by William Heste)
- Blue Bridge (Siny most, 1818, 1842–43, by William Heste and George Andreevich Adam)
- Postoffice Bridge (Pochtamtsky most, 1823–24, by Wilhelm von Traitteur)
- Big Stables Bridge (Bolshoy Konyushenny most, 1828, by George Adam)
- Tripartite Bridge (Malo-Konyushenny most, 1829–31, by George Adam and Wilhelm von Traitteur)
- First Engineer Bridge (Pervy Inzhenerny most, 1824–25, by George Adam and Wilhelm von Traitteur)
- First Sadovy Bridge (Pervy Sadovy most, 1835–36, by Pierre Dominique Bazaine)
- Yellow Bridge (Pevchesky most, 1839–40, by George Adam)

== Riverside architectural objects ==
Flowing through the 18th- and 19th-century capital of the Russian Empire, the Moyka, similarly to other downtown rivers and streets got its sides decorated with Russian nobles' city palaces, mansions and gardens, historical churches, monuments, apartment buildings and hotels, public squares etc.

=== Source. Summer Garden, Saint Michael's Castle, Mikhailovsky Garden and the Field of Mars ===
Source of Moyka with surrounding landmarks

The Moyka is a right-hand distributary of the Fontanka and starts its course immediately to the south of the Summer Garden, making the southern border of the garden Island and separating it from the reddish Saint Michael's Castle.

==== The Summer Garden ====
The Summer Garden, which during the Swedish possession of these lands until they were taken by Russia in 1703 in the Great Northern War, was part of a Swedish army major. After the foundation and planning of the new Russian capital in the lands of Saint Petersburg, the victorious Peter I of Russia made this land plot into a gridlined garden where he placed for the first time in Russian history multiple imported statues of Greek and Roman mythology characters and had his Summer Palace built here following Dutch examples he had seen and liked on his grand tour of Europe.

The Summer Garden and Palace, as well as the nearby Saint Michael's Castle and Garden, in post-Soviet Russia became branches of the national treasury of domestic art the Russian Museum and can be visited. The Summer Garden was mentioned by Alexander Pushkin both as his frequent place for pleasant walks, and as destination for childhood walks with a French governor of his classical for Russian literature novel in verse protagonist Eugene Onegin.

The garden's Moyka fence was designed by Ludwig Charlemagne.

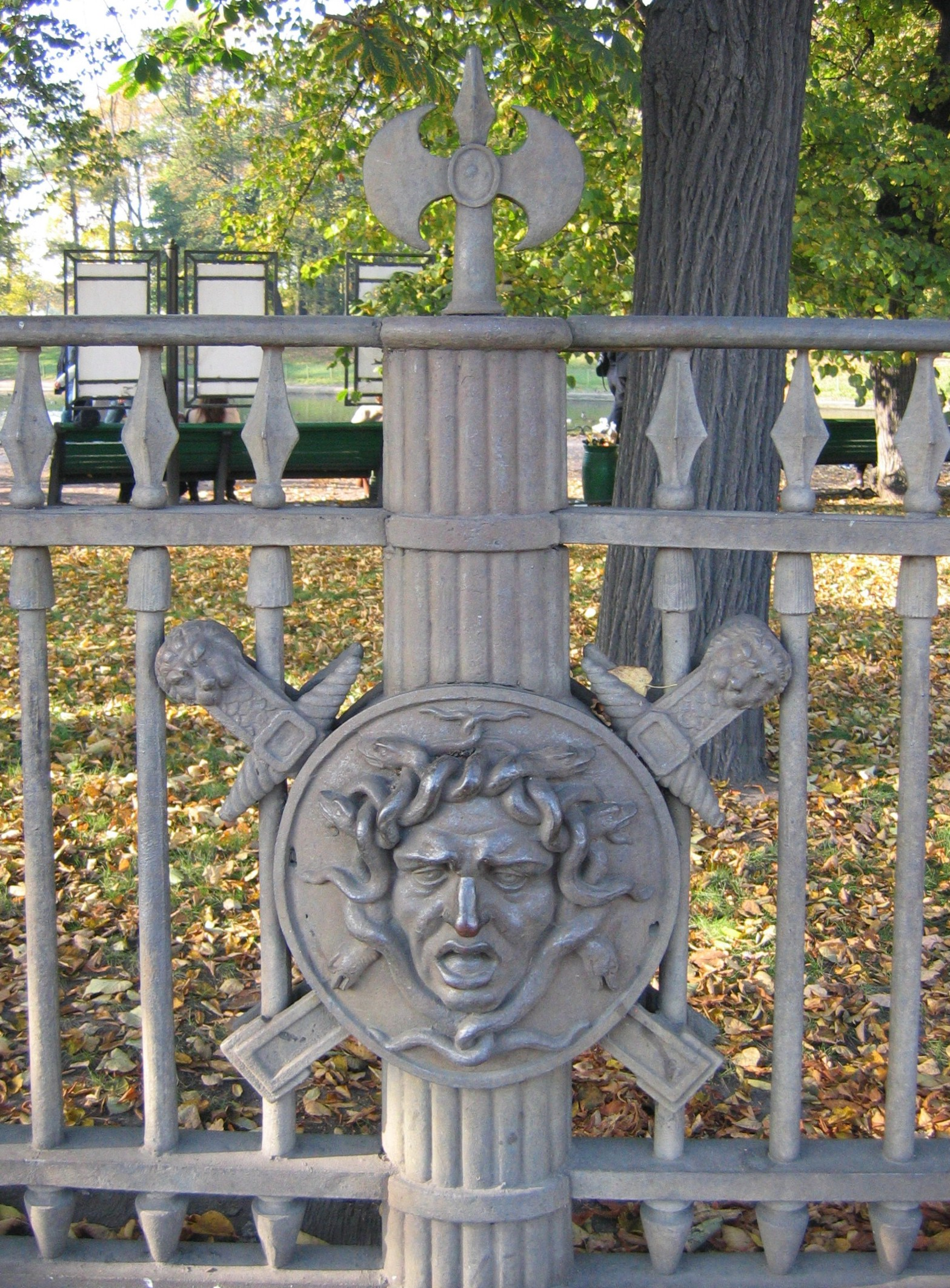
The Summer Garden's Moyka Fence, a detail depicting a shield with the head of Gorgon Medusa and attributes of Roman lictors' authority - fasces

Behind the fence there is a pond on which swans are released in warm season.

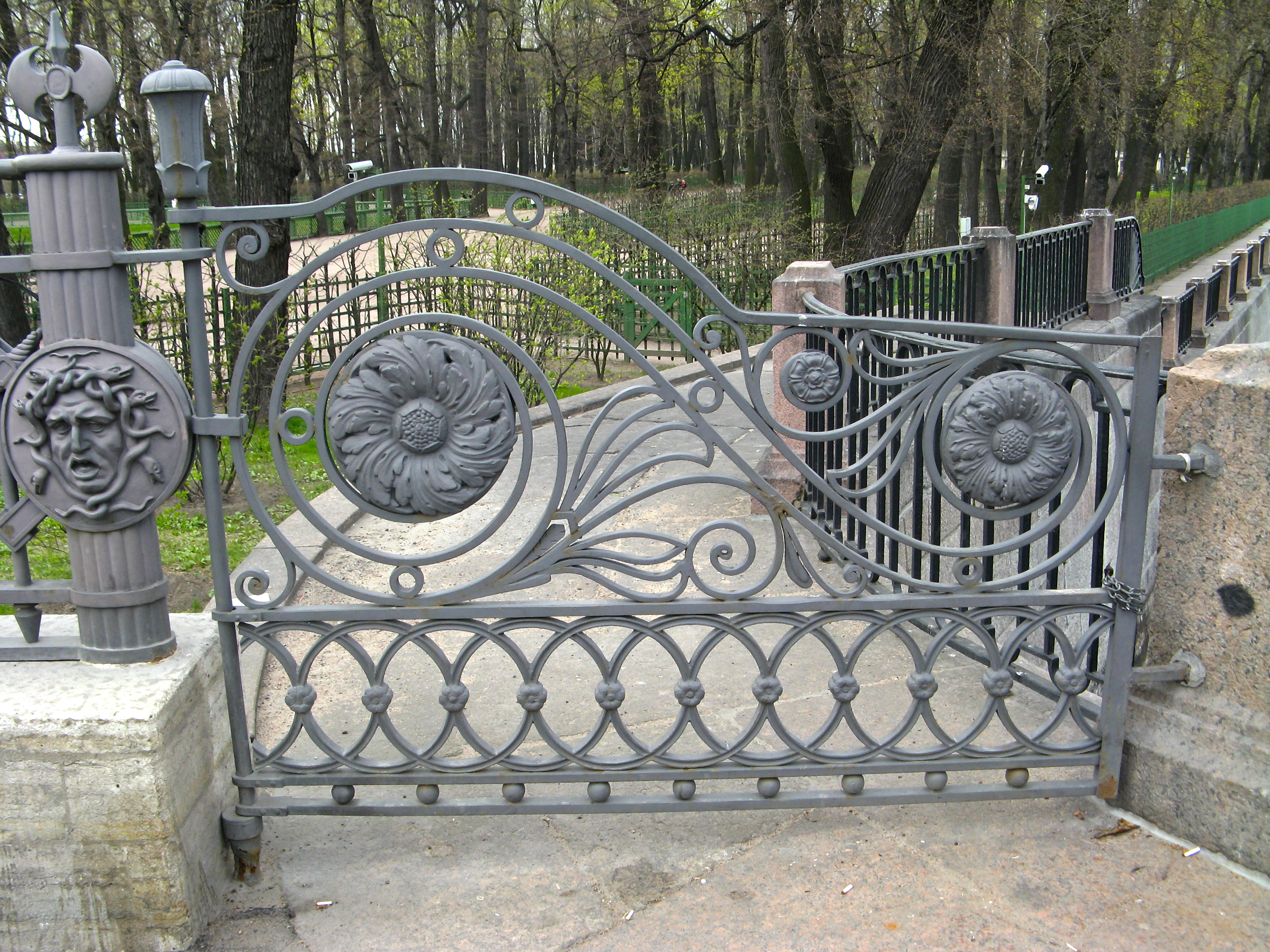
The Moyka fence of the Garden section near Fontanka

==== Saint Michael's Castle ====
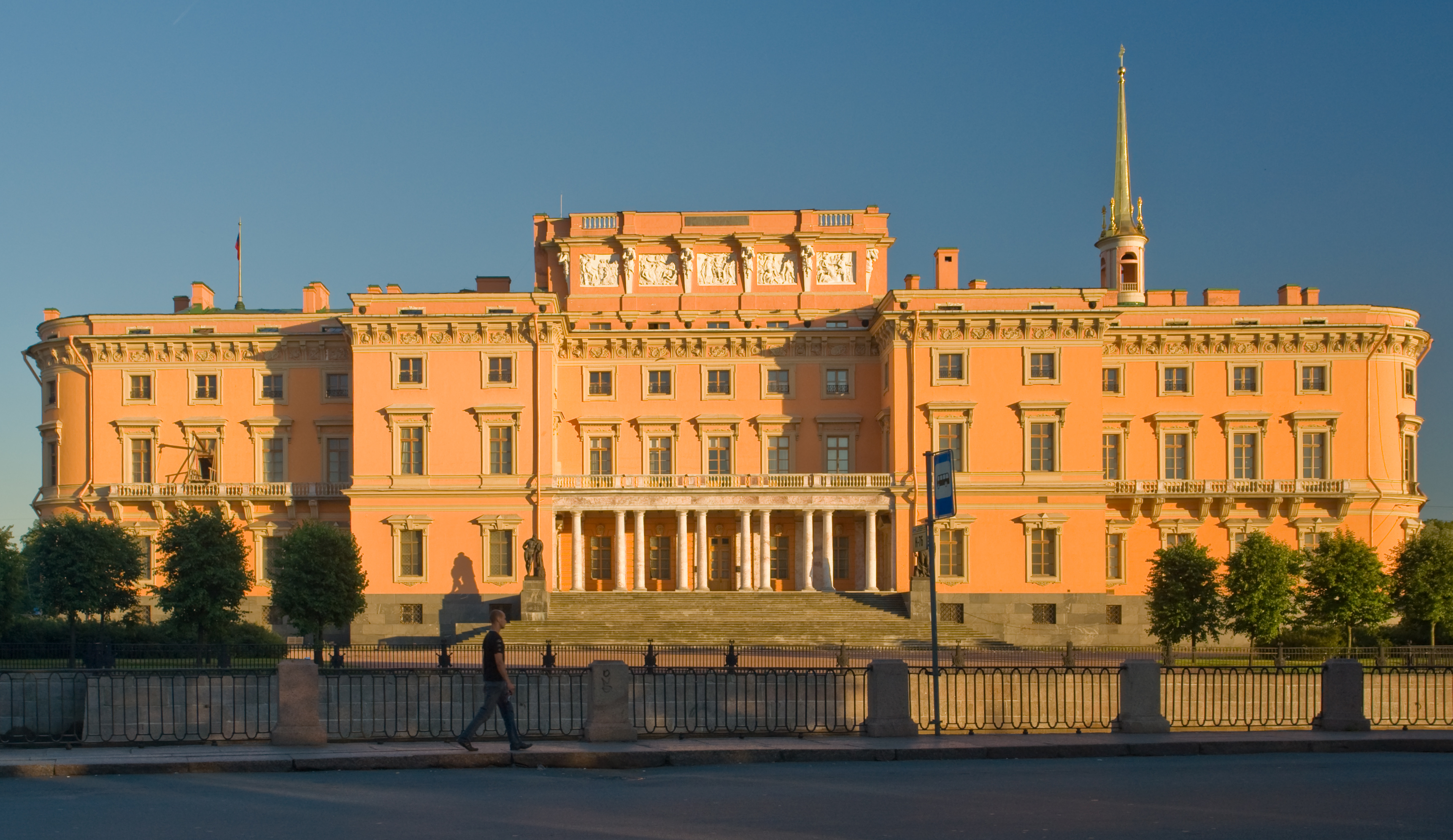
The Castle's Moyka façade

Across the Moyka from the Summer Garden stands Saint Michael's Castle commissioned in late 18th century for himself by Emperor Paul I of Russia who had been born on this site when it was occupied by another Summer Palace - of his officially childless unmarried aunt Elisabeth I of Russia. Inspired by Western Europe models, the Castle was symbolic both of the Emperor's romantic chivalrous inclinations and his fear for his life. Interested in the high spirit of European knights, he gave shelter in Russia to the Order of Malta when its members lost their island to the troops of Napoleon. Paul's decision was unusual, given known rivalry between their Roman Catholic and his Russian Orthodox Church. He temporarily served as their Grand Master, and the Castle served as a residence connected with this together with his other ones including Gatchina Priory Palace. (See Russian tradition of the Knights Hospitaller).

His arbitrary domestic and international politics caused dissatisfaction among some of his courtiers who plotted against him, and he was assassinated in his Castle bedroom despite all his precautions: the Castle was surrounded by water on all four sides, drawbridges raised every night, yet the guard let conspirators pass as the latter included senior supervising officers.

After him the Castle was virtually neglected by the royal family of his eldest son and heir Alexander I of Russia and was used as a shared living space by some of the Imperial household until it was converted into a Military Engineering School whose cadets included the future writer Fyodor Dostoevsky. The cadets studied and lived in the building under Paul's third son, Alexander's successor Emperor Nicholas I of Russia, and the edifice became also known as Engineers' Castle.

Occupied then by various Soviet institutions like the Central Naval Library, now the Castle is part of Russian Museum, has been repaired and holds national exhibitions of art connected with history of Russia.

Next to the Castle, on the Fontanka over the water near the source of Moyka, stands a miniature statue Chizhik-Pyzhik of a little bird siskin across the river from the 19th-century Emperor's Law School, whose students' uniforms' colour matched the bird's colouration.

==== Mikhailovsky Garden and the Field of Mars ====
On the right bank of Moyka across the Swan Canal from the Summer Garden lies a large open square named the Field of Mars after the Roman mythology god of war because in the late 18th and in 19th centuries it was used for Emperors' military parades of the regiments quartered in the city as the capital of the country. Before that, the once marshy ground had been drained with canals and turned into a public meadow with amusements. When turned to military use, the ground was decorated with two monuments to victorious Russian Field Marshals of the second half of 18th century. One of the memorials - an obelisk to Count Pyotr Rumyantsev - was later moved to a dedicated smaller Rumyantsev Garden in Vassiliyevskiy Island, while the other, the Suvorov Monument depicting Count Alexander Suvorov as Mars, now on Suvorov Square at the other end of the field, facing Trinity Bridge.

After the February 1917 democratic revolution that destroyed the Russian autocracy, part of the field was used to bury the casualties of the revolutionary events, and in the Soviet times this part was made into the Monument to the Fighters of the Revolution, a memorial of granite slabs inscribed with dedications to the heroes by the Bolshevik Government Secretary for Education Anatoly Lunacharskiy, and a gas burner eternal flame was placed in the middle. Many cultivars of lilac were planted in the square. In post-Soviet Russia the rest of the field has seen a number of public political rallies.

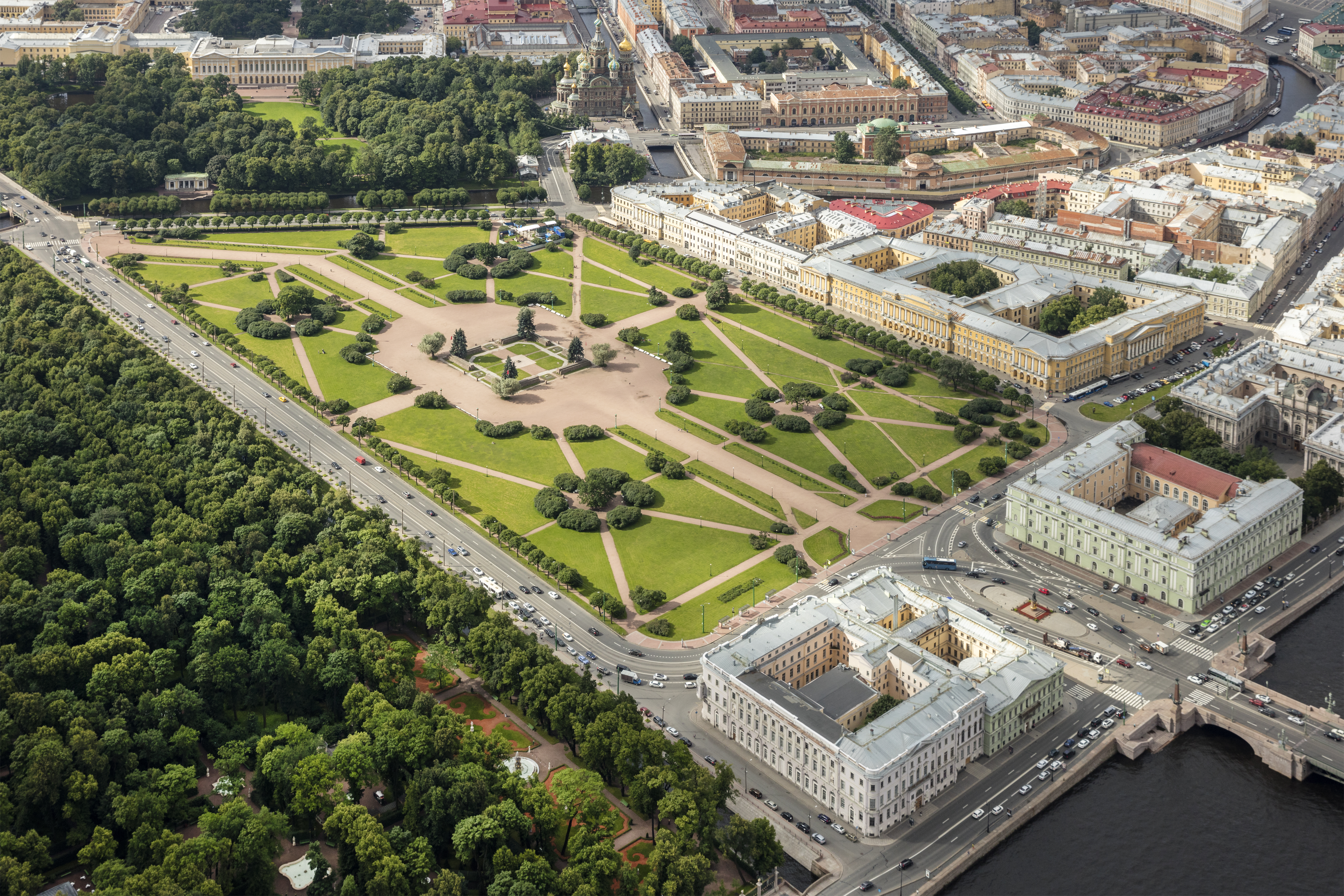
Field of Mars 2016 aerial view

Mikhailovsky Garden is across the Moyka from the Field of Mars and across Sadovaya ("Garden") Street. It is a 19th-century landscape garden, whose southern part meets the garden façade of Mikhailovsky Palace facing Arts Square not far from the city's main street Nevsky Prospect. The Palace, built for Paul I's fourth son Grand Duke Mikhail, was later in the 19th century converted to the royal museum of the nation's art named after Alexander III with the nationwide ethnographic department. These serve to this day as the Russian Museum and the Russian Ethnographic Museum. The garden's western side with a decorative fence faces another waterway, a canal originally named after Catherine II who commissioned it, but after the 1917 revolution renamed in honour of the playwright Alexander Griboyedov. Next to the garden there stands a brightly coloured tall church of the Saviour on the Spilled Blood. This place of worship and now a museum was built in a traditional Russian style to mark the canalside spot on which Emperor Alexander II who had in 1861 abolished serfdom was on 1 March 1881, assassinated by terrorists from the Narodnaya Volya movement.

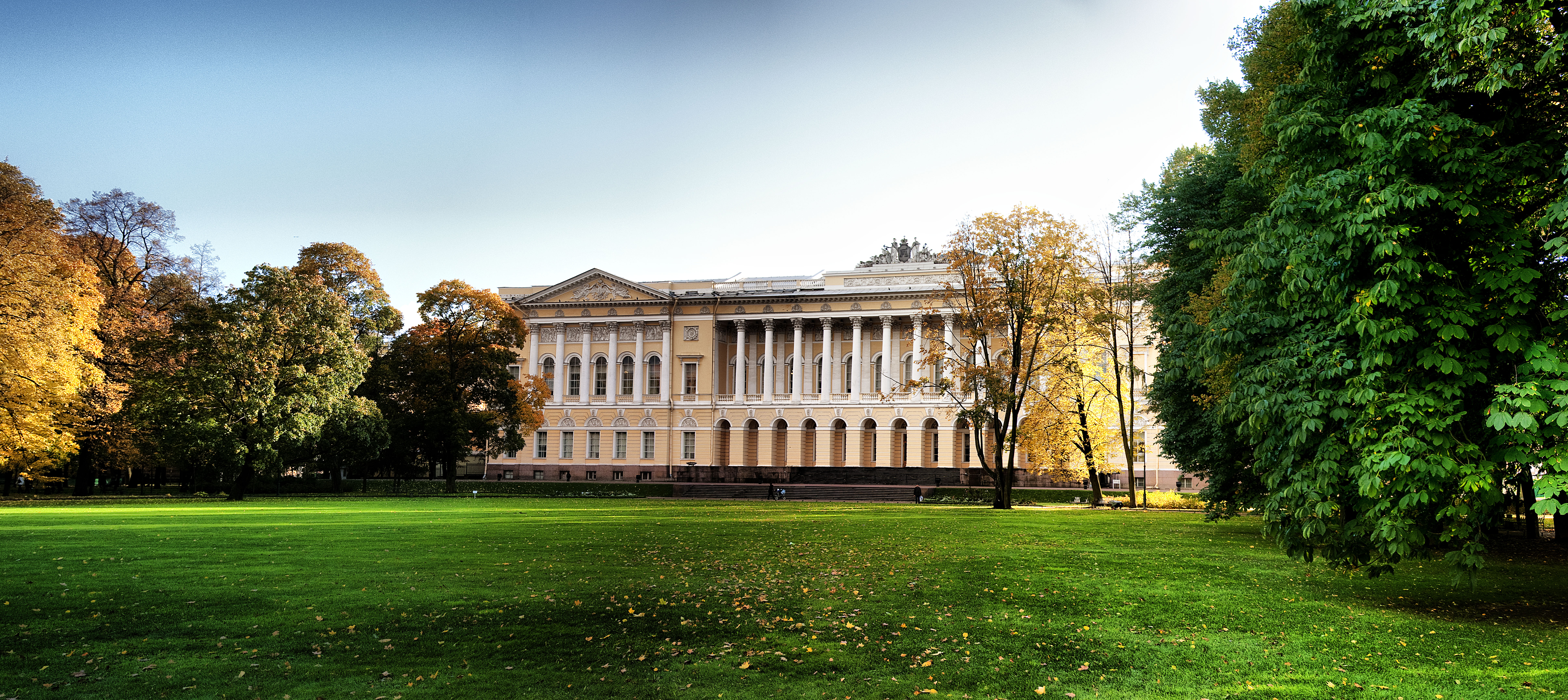
View across the Mikhailovsky Garden towards the northern facade of the Mikhailovsky Palace

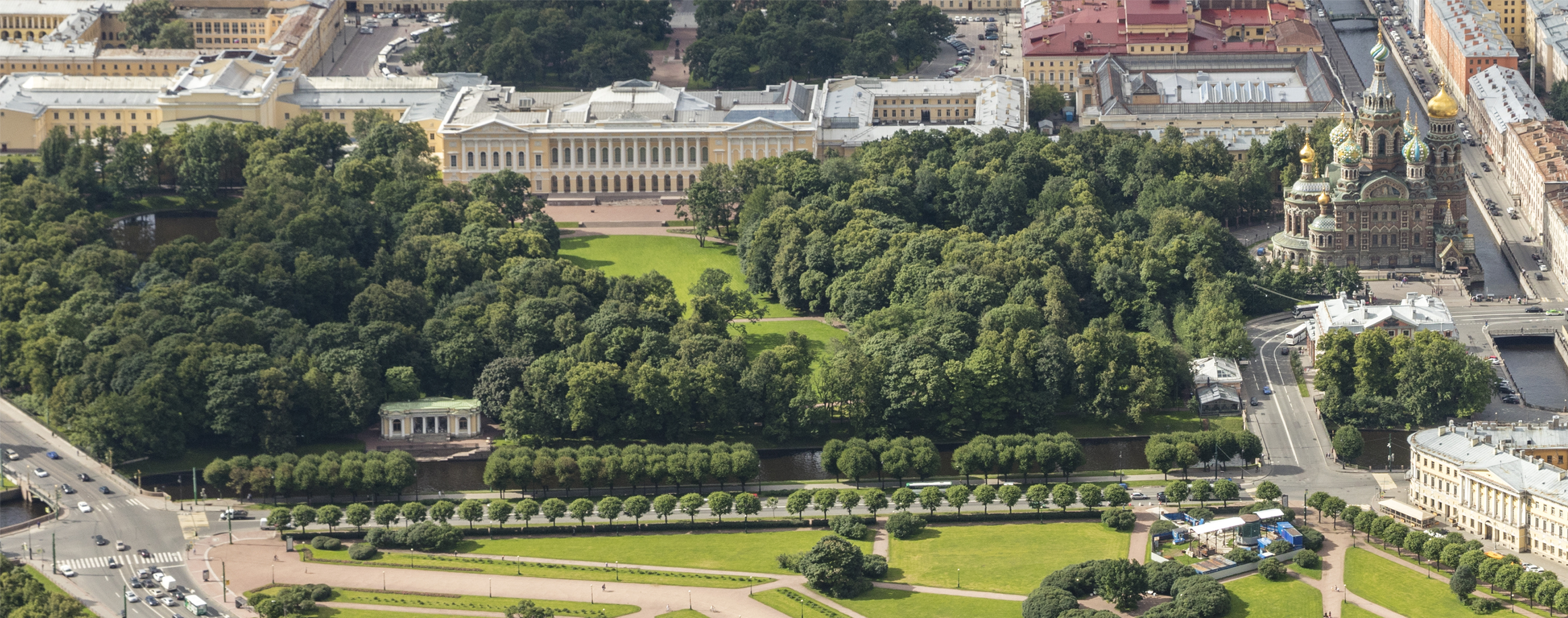
Aerial view of the Mikhailovsky Garden, looking towards the south. The course of the Moyka River and the Rossi Pavilion in the foreground, and the Mikhailovsky Palace in the background. The Church of the Saviour on Blood is visible to the right of the picture.

=== Royal Stables and eponymous square ===
The Mikhailovsky Garden's western side is next to the Church of the Saviour on the Spilled Blood and a degree college named Higher School of Folk Arts (crafts), originally founded by Empress Alexandra, the wife of Russia's last Emperor, and facing a waterway that starts here off Moyka - Griboyedov Canal, across which westwards there is a square formed chiefly by two buildings of the former Royal Mews and named after them together with two adjoining streets Konyushennaya. The carriage house faces the square while the neoclassical stable also runs along the Moyka.

=== Stroganov Palace ===
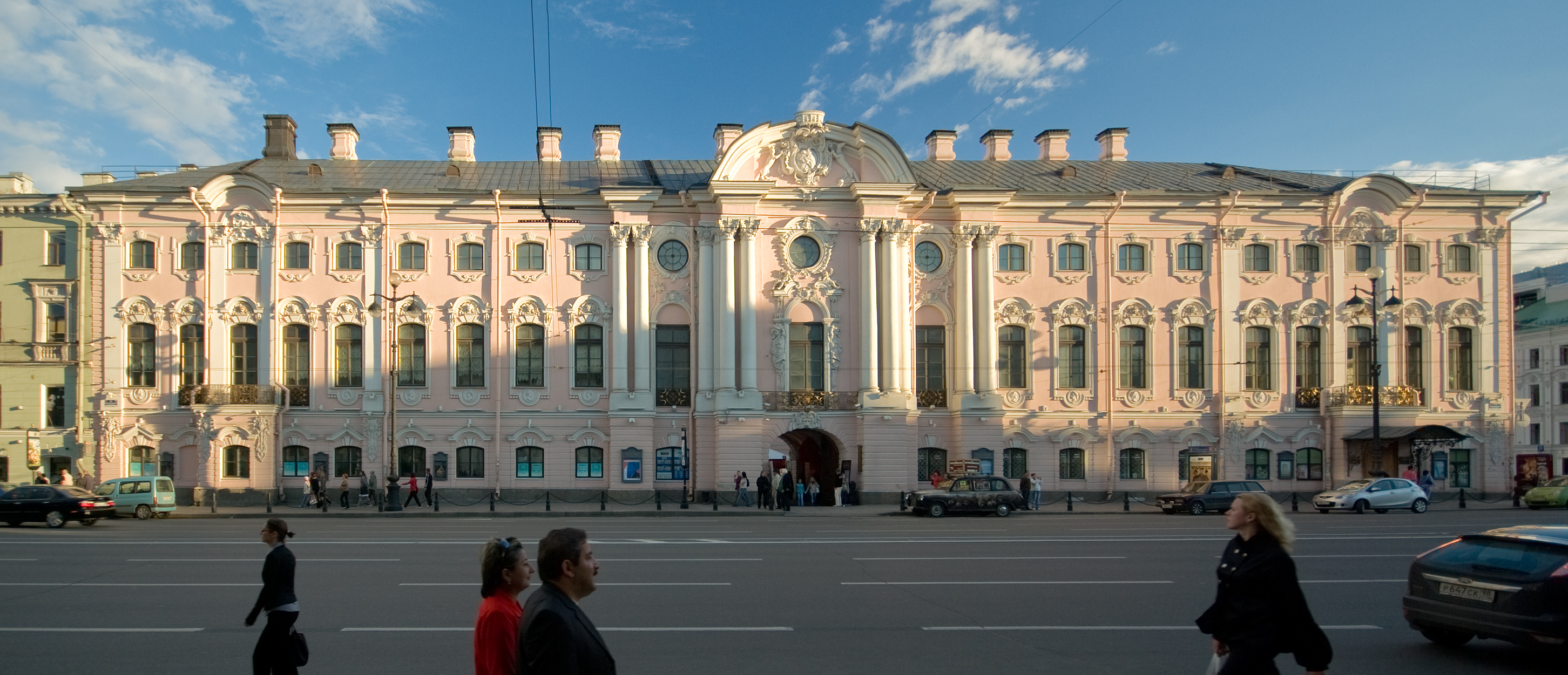

=== Alexander Herzen Russian State Pedagogical University main campus ===
The 18th-century estate of Count Razumovsky with its palace and outbuildings was converted towards the end of the century into a royal charity - an orphanage that for the first time in national history gave shelter to children born out of wedlock, whose mothers could anonymously leave them in a basket supervised by the gatekeeper. They were nurtured and given general and vocational training and, if born to serfs, were set free from submission to landlords of their parents. Its mascot was the pelican, once believed to sacrifice itself nursing its young.

The bird is now on the crest of the city's large teacher-training university located in the former estate. Giving multilevel higher education at its colleges (faculties and institutes) grouped by school subjects and administrative spheres, in the 1990s it was recognised as having national importance. Named in the Soviet times after the 19th-century Russian liberal thinker and writer Alexander Herzen. The main campus has about 20 buildings occupying a large city block, while some colleges of the university are scattered around the city.

48 Moyka Embankment: Razumovsky Palace - Royal Orphanage - Russian State Pedagogical University

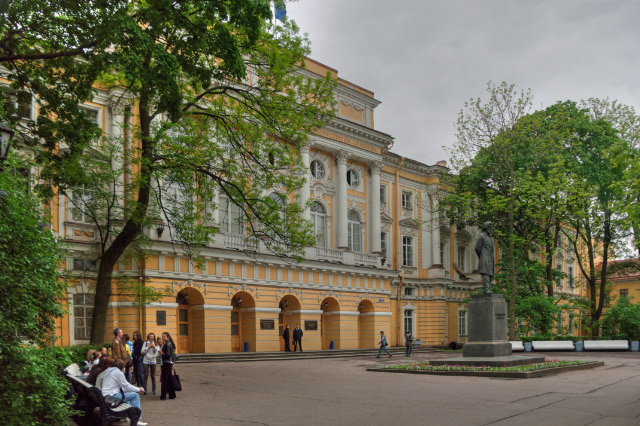

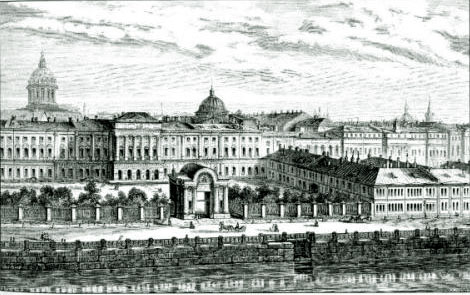

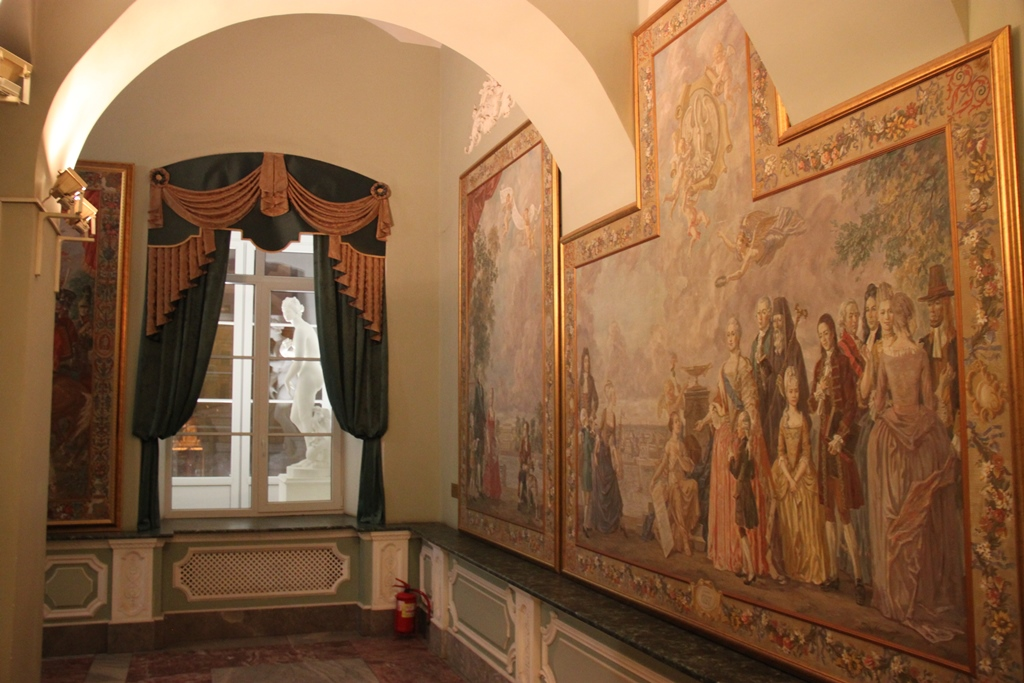

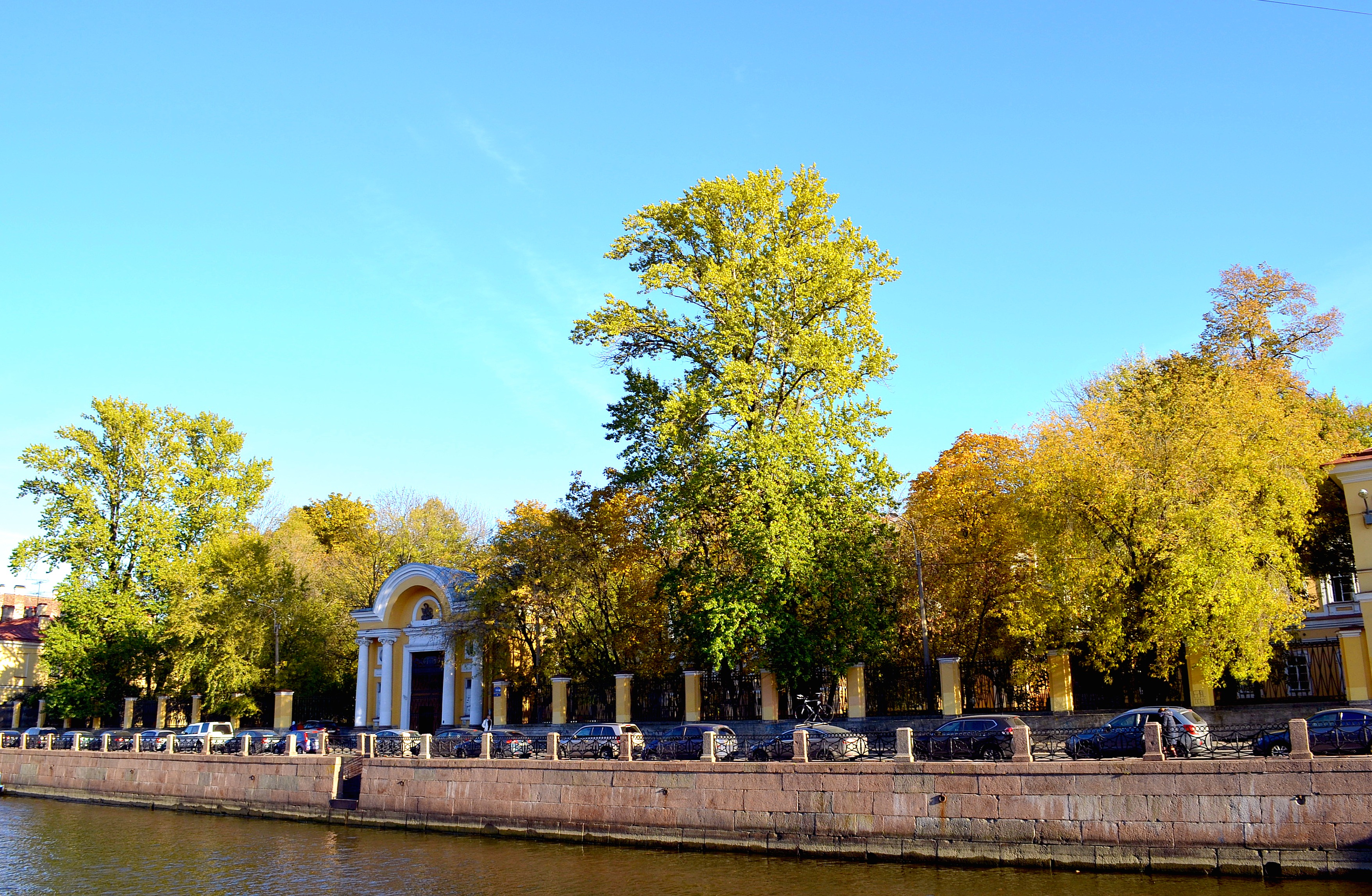

=== Saint Isaac's Square ===
Saint Isaac's Square

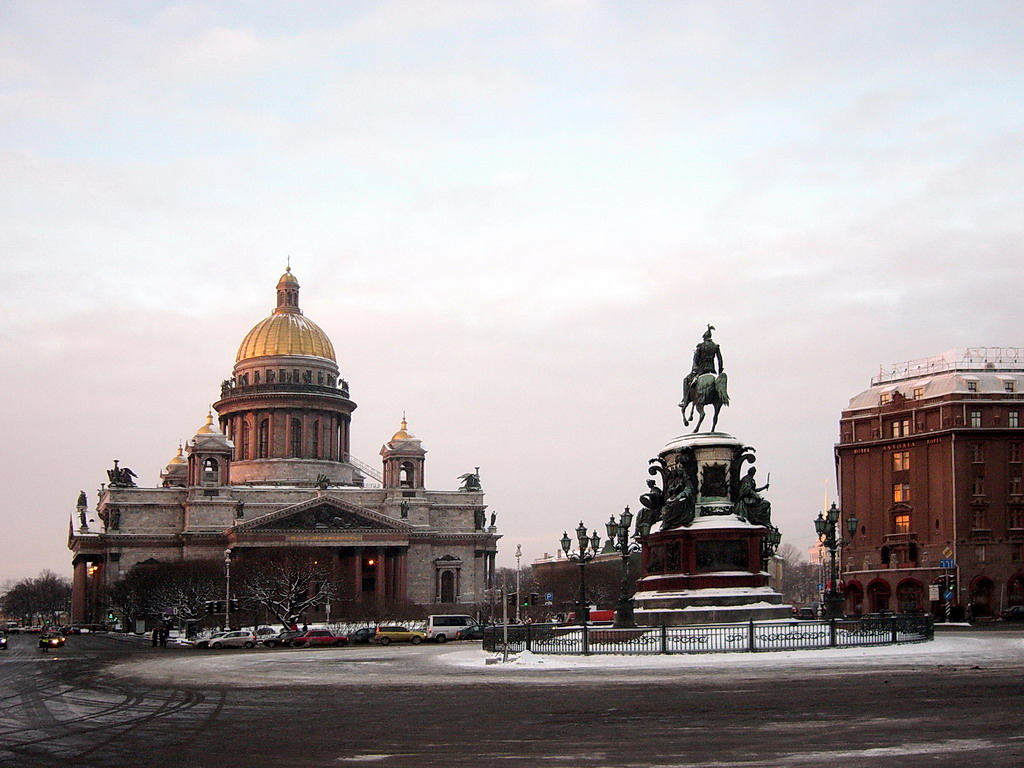
Saint Isaac of Dalmatia's Cathedral and horseback monument to Emperor Nicholas I of Russia, Astoria Hotel on the right

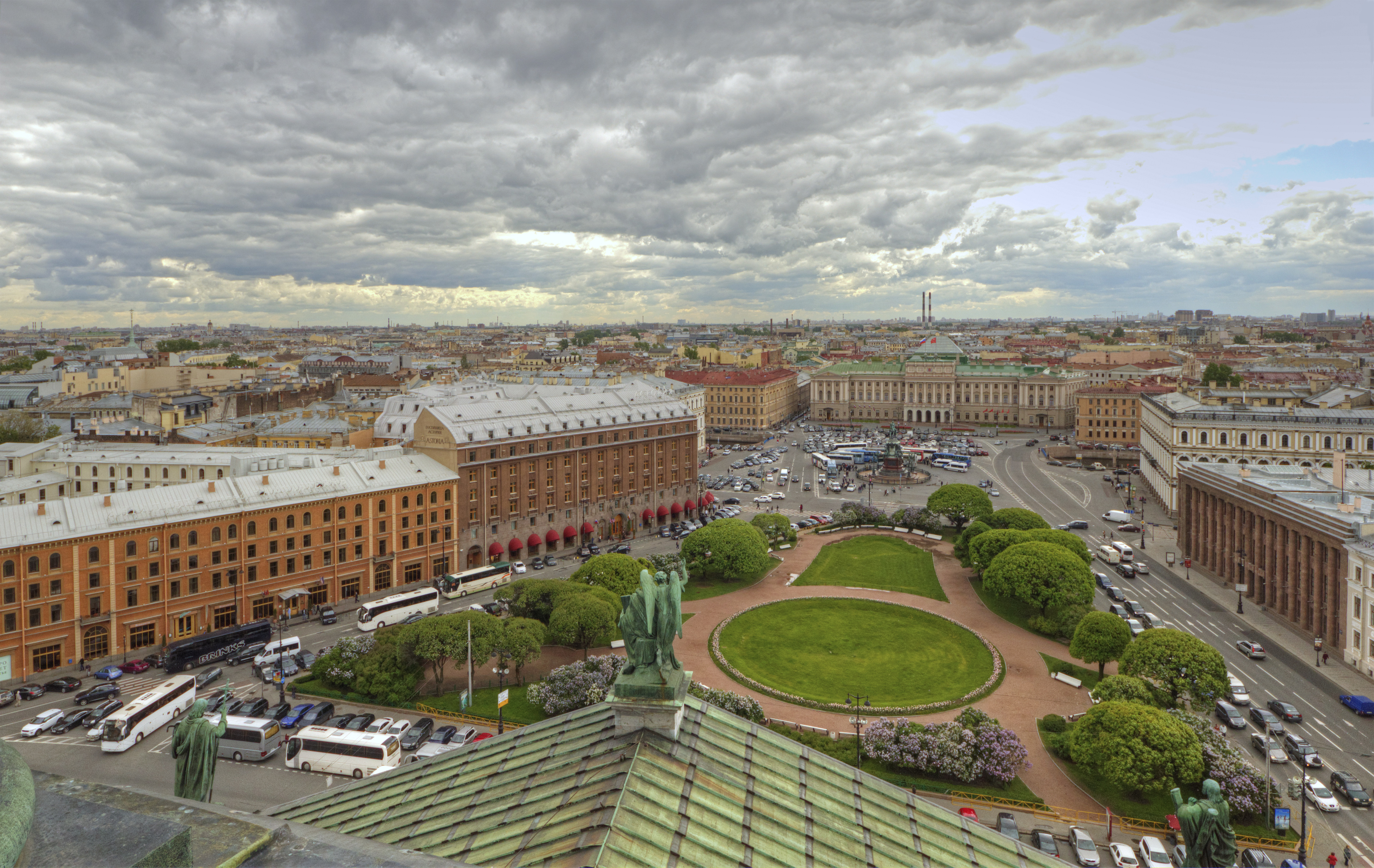
View from the Cathedral towards Grand Princess Maria's Palace housing Saint Petersburg Legislative Assembly

=== Count Yusupovs' Moika Palace ===
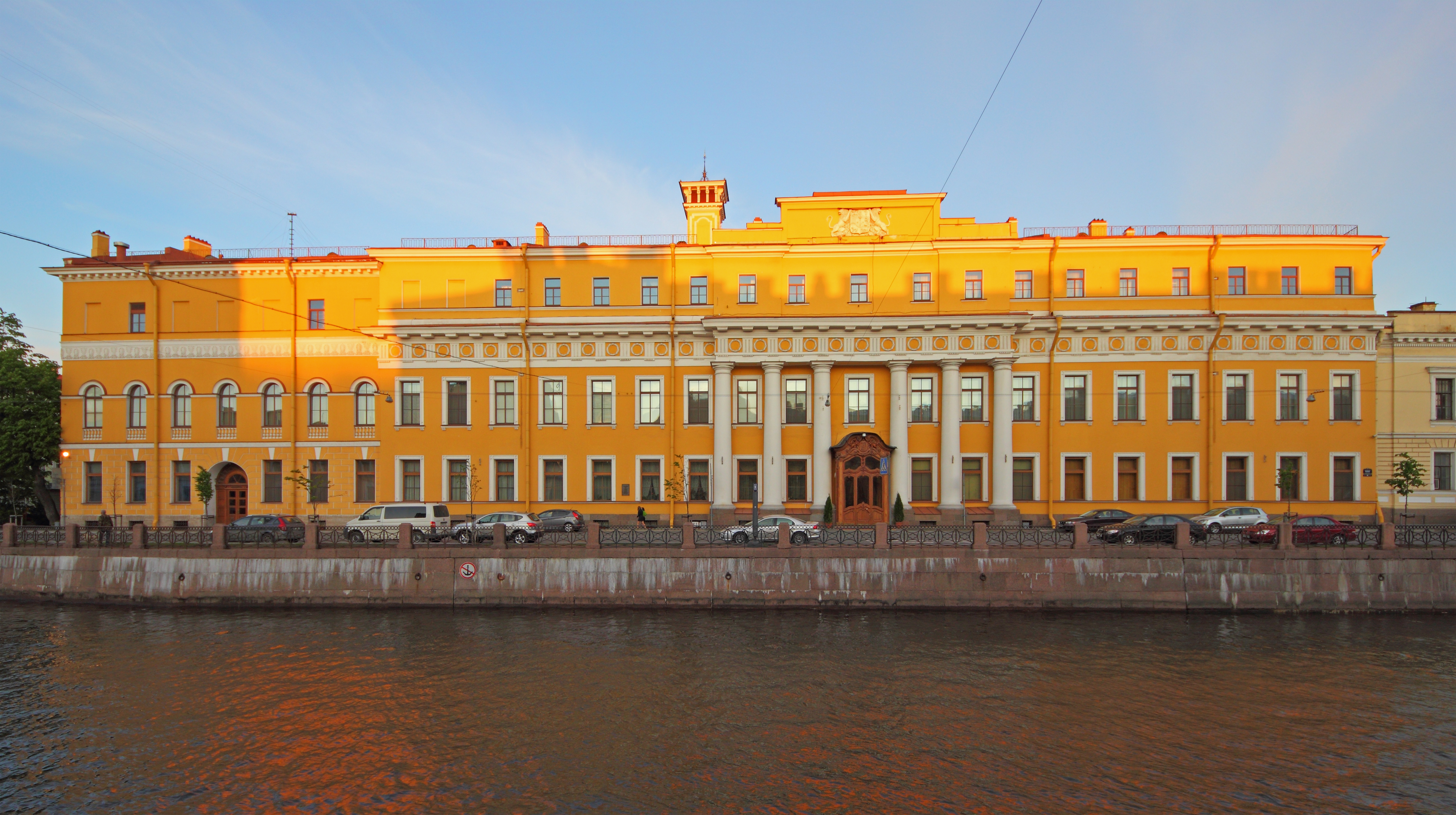

== See also ==
- List of bridges in Saint Petersburg
- Fontanka
- Griboyedov Canal
- Kryukov Canal
