= Summer Garden =

Park in Saint Petersburg, Russia

Coordinates: 59.946°N 30.335°E

- Interactive map of Summer Garden

The Summer Garden Island (Central Saint Petersburg)

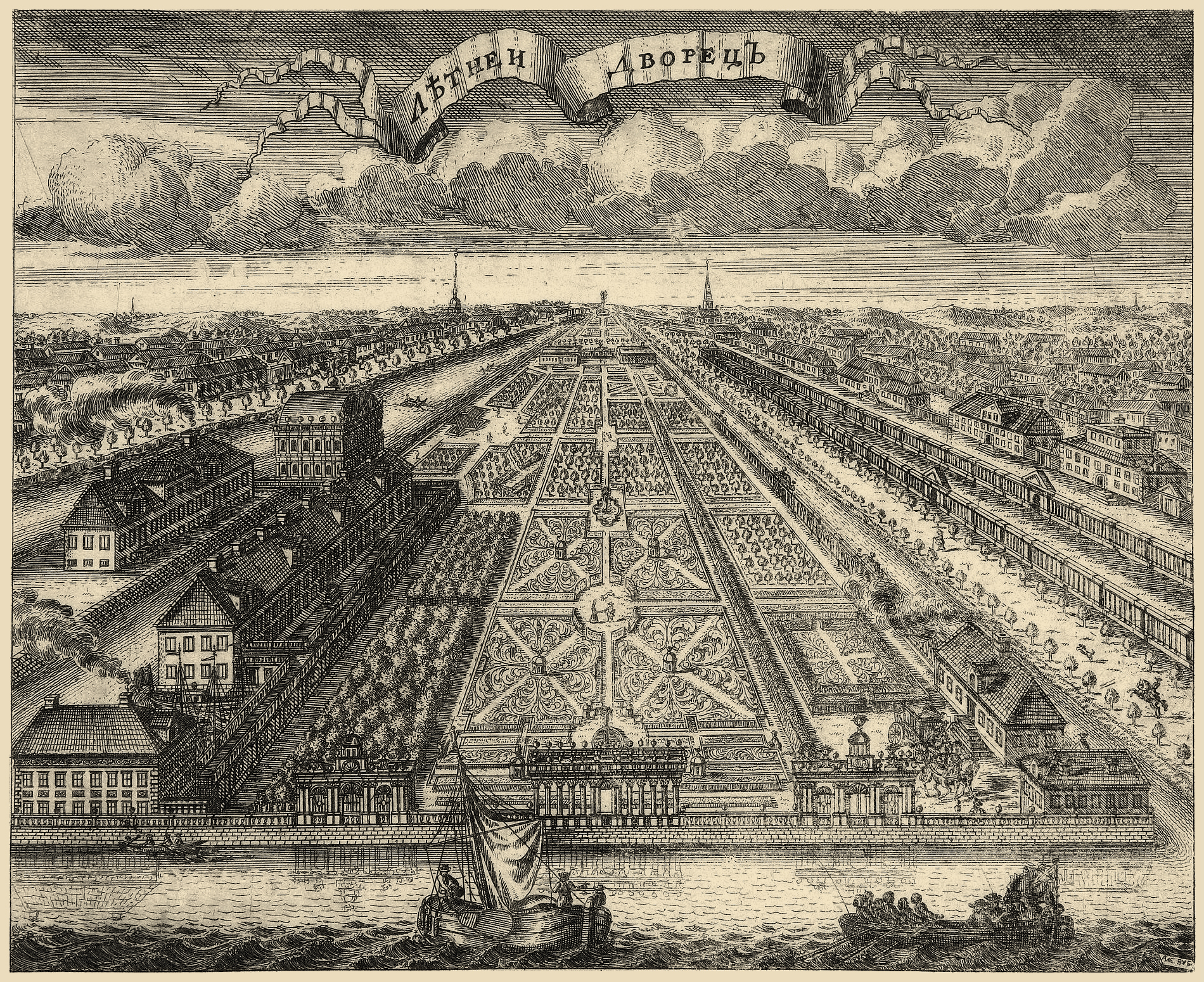
Vista through the Summer Garden towards the Summer Palace, 1716

The Summer Garden (Russian: Летний сад, romanized: Letny sad) is a historic public garden that occupies an eponymous island between the Neva, Fontanka, Moyka, and the Swan Canal in downtown Saint Petersburg, Russia and shares its name with the adjacent Summer Palace of Peter the Great. Its inception dates back to the early 18th century when Russia took these lands from Sweden in the Great Northern War. Being a monument of landscape architecture featuring original and copied sculptures of classical mythology characters, a former royal palace and a monument to the fable author Ivan Krylov, the garden is now a branch of the Saint Petersburg-based national art treasury Russian Museum.

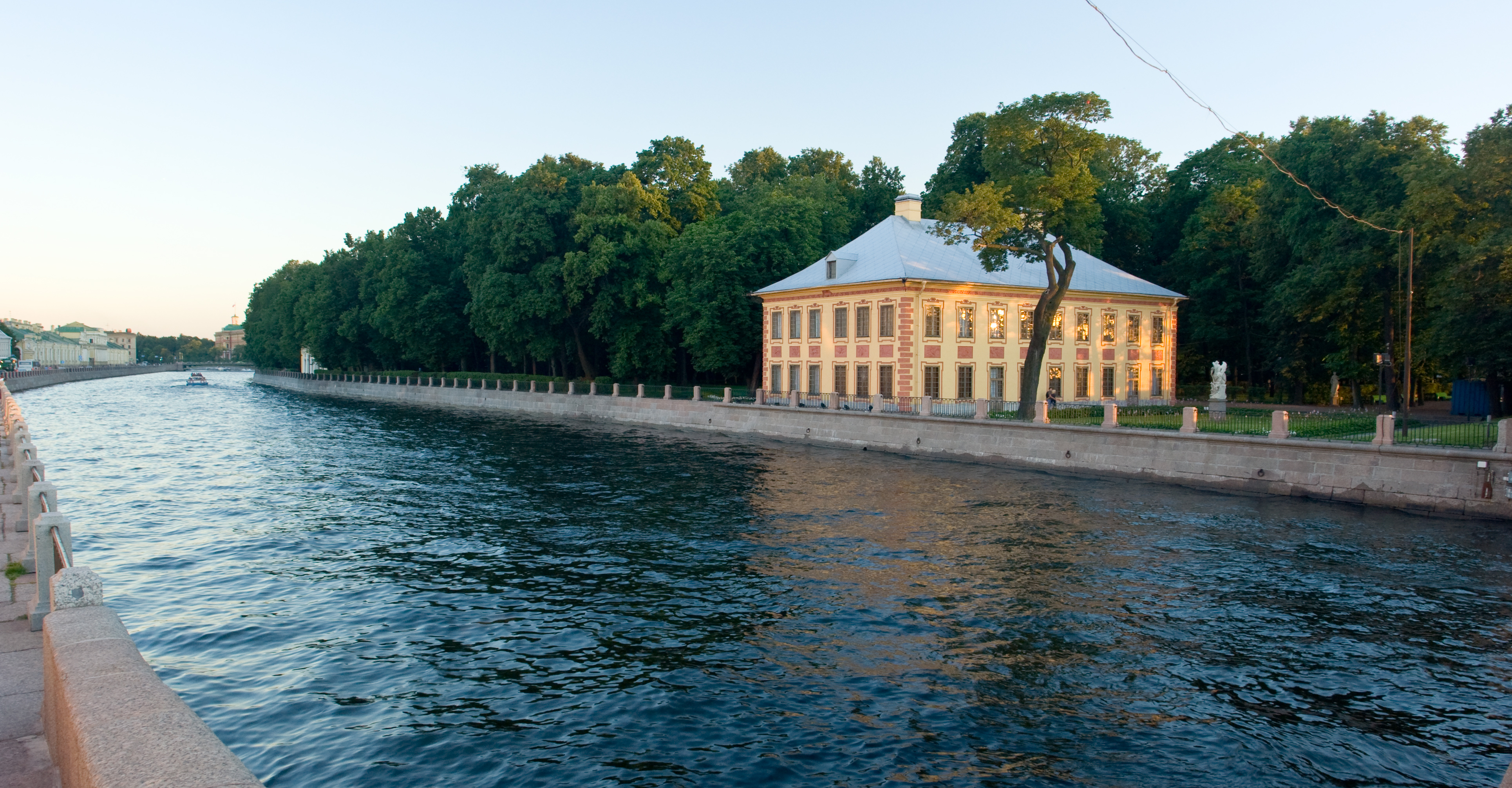
The palace as seen from across the Fontanka River from a small Prachechniy ("(Royal) Laundry") Bridge along Kutuzov Embankment in August 2007.

== Landscape design ==
=== Original ===
The park was personally designed by Tsar Peter in 1704, supposedly, with the assistance of the Dutch gardener and physician Nicolaas Bidloo. Starting from 1712, the planting of the Summer Garden was further elaborated by the Dutch gardener Jan Roosen, who was the chief gardener of the park till 1726. The well-known French architect Jean-Baptiste Le Blond, who arrived in St. Petersburg in 1716, added to the park the flavour of a Garden à la française. The Summer Garden was largely completed in 1719. The walks were lined with a hundred allegorical marble sculptures, executed by Francesco Penso, Pietro Baratta, Marino Gropelli, Alvise Tagliapietra, Bartolomeo Modulo and other Venetian sculptors that were acquired by Sava Vladislavich. In the late 20th century, 90 surviving statues were moved indoors, while modern replicas took their place in the park.

=== Later ===
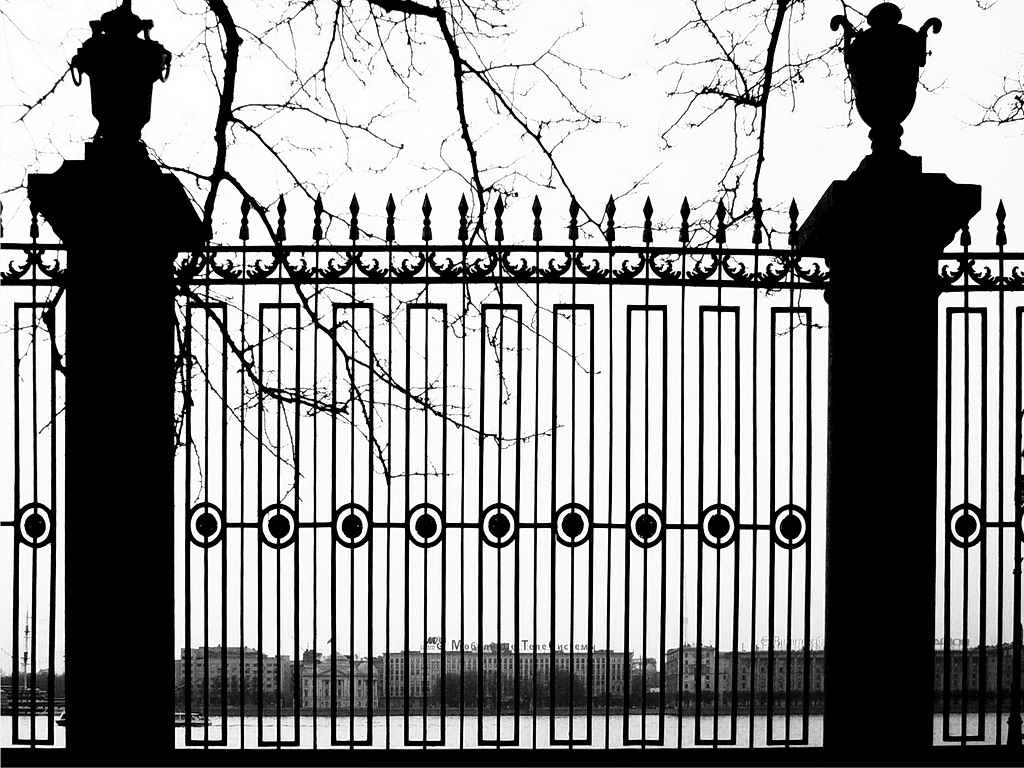
The railing of Summer Garden

A delicate iron-cast railing, separating the park from the public walk of the Palace Embankment, was installed between 1771 and 1784. The poet Anna Akhmatova, among others, considered the grille to be a pinnacle of art-casting and one of the symbols of St Petersburg.

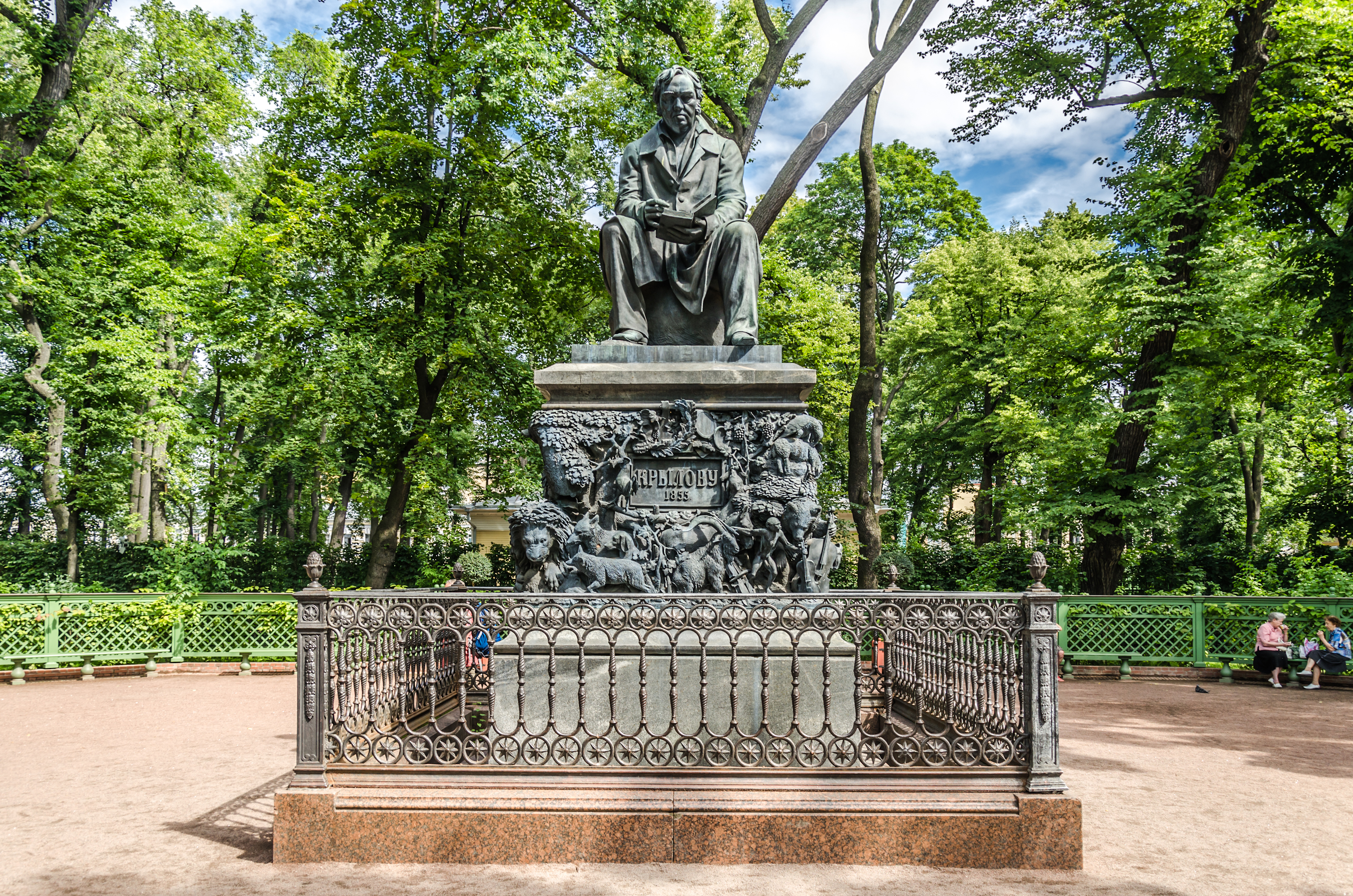
The monument to Ivan Krylov in Summer Garden

In the 1820s, a grotto pavilion, attributed to Andreas Schlüter and Georg Johann Mattarnovy, was rebuilt into a coffee house. On the bank of the Carp Pond, a porphyry vase, a gift of Charles XIV of Sweden to the tsar, was installed in 1839. Fifteen years later, a famous monument to the children's writer Ivan Krylov was opened in the park. A sign of the progress of Romanticism in Russian official culture, it was the first monument to a poet erected in Eastern Europe.

On 4 April 1866 Dmitry Karakozov made the first attempt to assassinate the tsar when he walked out of the Summer Garden. As the attempt proved abortive, the ponderous Summergrille memorial chapel in a Russian Revival style was built over the gate. This reattachment was demolished by the Bolsheviks after the October Revolution.

== Sculptures ==
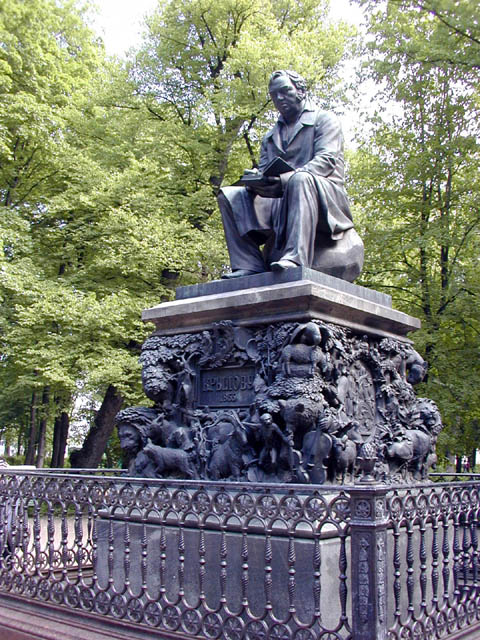
The seated statue of the Russian 18-19 century fabulist, magazine publisher and librarian Ivan Krylov with pedestal showing the animal characters of his fables. The first Russia's monument to a private person. Sculptor Baron Peter Clodt von Jürgensburg

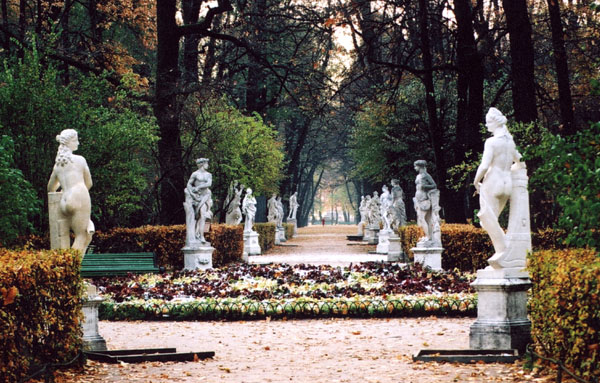
One of the walks of the Summer Garden

In the 19th century, the intended arrangement of the decorative sculptures in the Summer Garden was forgotten, quite a few of the sculptures were no longer extant, and those remaining were moved from place to place, thus destroying the original design. In late 20th century, all sculptures were rearranged and today they stand in accordance with the aesthetic ideas characteristic of the beginning of the 18th century. To protect sculptures from winter weather they have been traditionally covered with wooden cases and reopened in warm season and cleaned; to further safeguard valuable antiques, protecting them from vandalism as well, Russian Museum initiated copying them to keep in the adjacent St Michael's Castle (another branch of the same Museum), placing copies in the open garden.

== See also ==
- Alexander Garden (Saint Petersburg)
