= First Winter Bridge =

Bridge in Saint Petersburg, Russia

First Winter Bridge 1-й Зимний мост
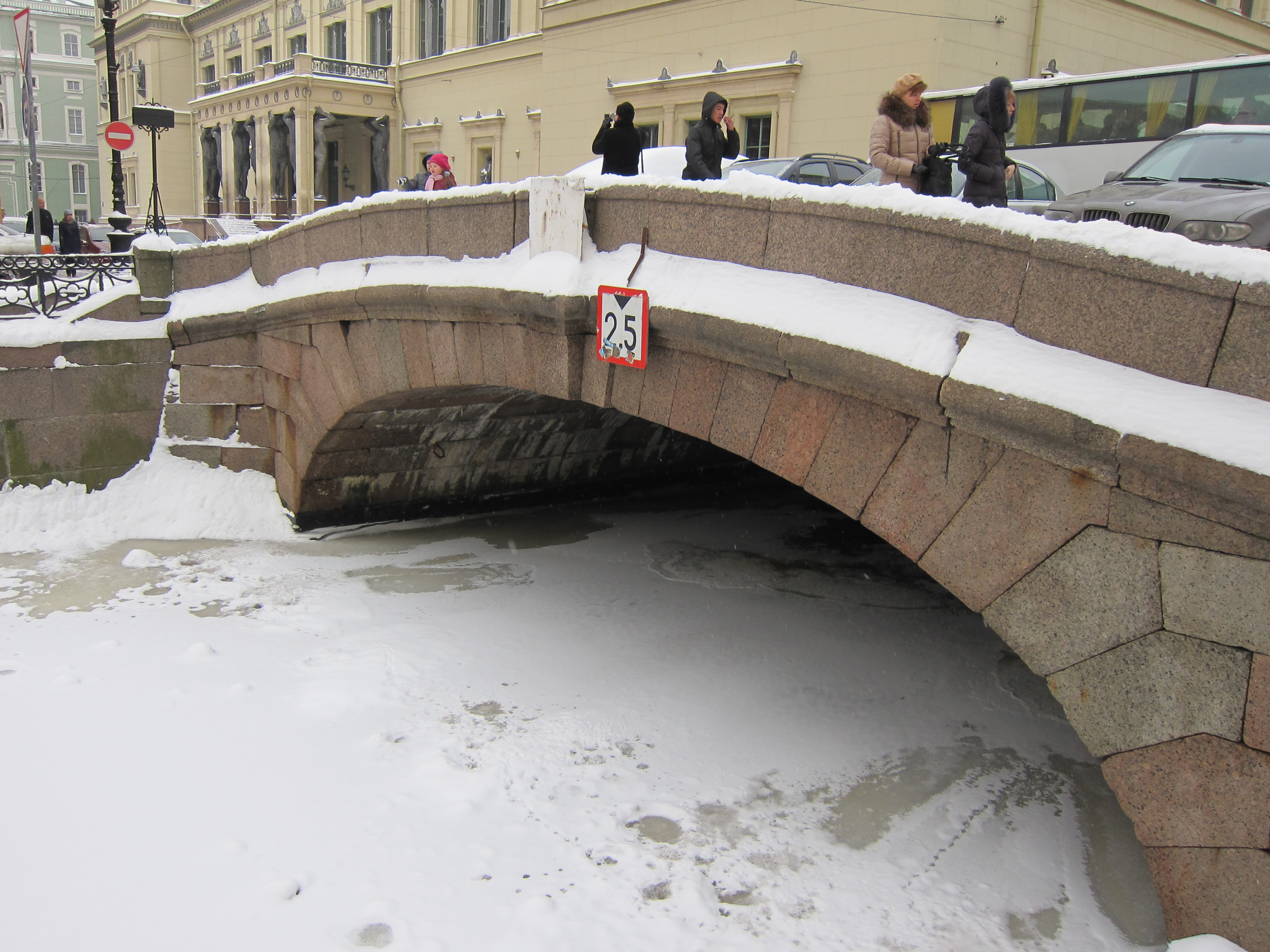
- Coordinates: 59°56′29″N 030°19′07″E
- Carries: Vehicles; Pedestrians
- Crosses: Winter Canal
- Locale: Saint Petersburg

Characteristics
- Total length: 19.4 m (64 ft)
- Width: 21.6 m (71 ft)

History
- Opened: 1720 (in wood); 1784 (in stone)

The First Winter Bridge (Russian: 1-й Зимний мост) is a single-span stone bridge in Saint Petersburg, carrying Millionnaya Street across the Winter Canal. The current bridge was originally built in 1768 to cross a different watercourse, and was rebuilt and opened in its present location in 1784.

There has been a bridge on the site of the present crossing since the digging of the Winter Canal between 1718 and 1719. It was initially a wooden drawbridge design, and was replaced by a triple-span fixed wooden bridge in the mid-eighteenth century. This was in turn replaced in the 1780s by a single-span stone arched bridge, which had originally been built over the nearby Red Canal. This bridge, designed by Yury Felten and I. G. Rossi, with its construction supervised by engineer T. I. Nasonov, was rendered obsolete after the Red Canal was filled in during the late 1770s. The bridge was subsequently disassembled, moved to the Winter Canal, and reassembled there. It has remained in its new location ever since, undergoing various changes in its name, before its current name appeared in 1940. It was repaired in the 1950s, but has retained its architectural appearance from the eighteenth century, and has been designated an object of historical and cultural heritage of federal significance.

== Location and design ==
The First Winter Bridge is in Dvortsovy Municipal Okrug, part of the Tsentralny District of the city. It carries Millionnaya Street across the Winter Canal close to the Winter Palace. It is a stone single-span arched bridge 19.4 m (64 ft) long and 21.6 m (71 ft) wide. Its abutments rest on a pile foundation, with its facades faced with granite. It has a solid granite parapet and pavements, with step descents to the canal embankment. Two descents from the embankment on the upstream side of the bridge provide access to the canal waters. It is one of three bridges that cross the Winter Canal, the others being Hermitage Bridge, at the canal's junction with the Neva, and Second Winter Bridge, at the point the canal splits from the Moyka.

== History ==
The Winter Canal began as a channel dug between 1718 and 1719, connecting the Neva and Moyka Rivers in the vicinity of the Winter Palace of Peter the Great. A wooden lifting drawbridge was built spanning the canal at Bolshaya Nemetskaya Street, present day Millionnaya Street, between 1718 and 1720. It was rebuilt as a triple-span fixed bridge, again in wood, in the mid-eighteenth century. In 1768 a single-span stone arched bridge was built over the nearby Red Canal, which also connected the Neva and Moika, along the western edge of the Tsaritsyn Meadow, now the Field of Mars. This bridge, which carried Bolshaya Nemetskaya Street over the Red Canal, was designed by Yury Felten and I. G. Rossi, with its construction supervised by engineer T. I. Nasonov. The Red Canal was filled in by 1780, having become unnecessary, and occupying land wanted for construction. The stone bridge was dismantled between 1783 and 1784, taken piece by piece to the Winter Canal, and reassembled there, replacing the wooden bridge dating from 1768. The canal embankment was in the process of being faced in granite at this time.

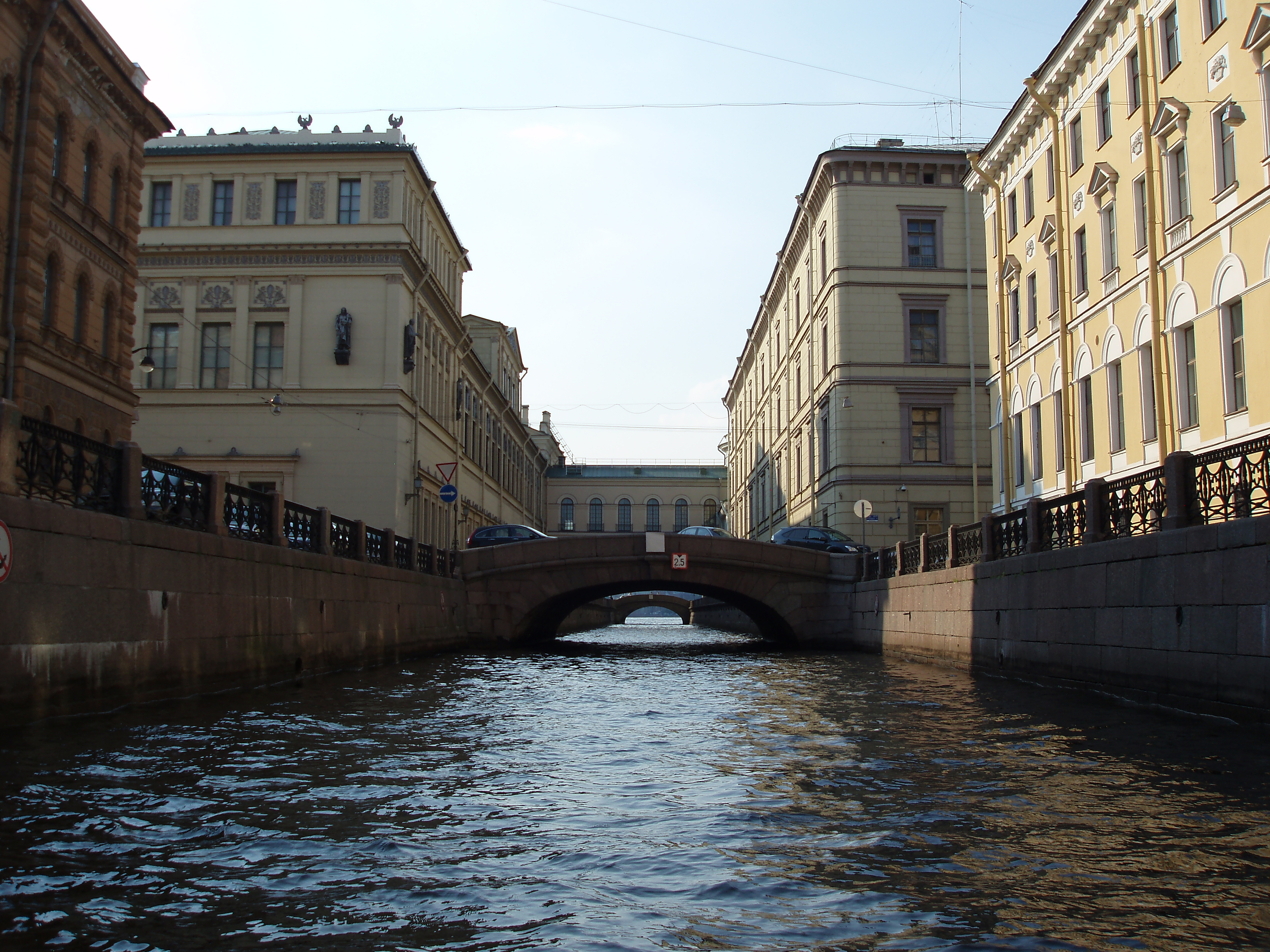
The bridge viewed from the canal, with the Hermitage Bridge beyond

The wooden bridge in this location was initially called the German Bridge (Russian: Немецкий мост) from 20 April 1738, after Bolshaya Nemetskaya Street, meaning Great German Street. The name came from the large proportion of Germans who settled in the area, causing it to be termed the "German Settlement". The term German Bridge appears on maps, while the name "Bridge of the Old Winter Palace" (Russian: мостом старого Зимнего дворца) was also in common use. The street was later renamed Millionnaya, with the new stone bridge becoming Millionnaya Bridge. The name Transfiguration Bridge (Russian: Преображенский мост) appears on an 1828 map of the city, after the Preobrazhensky Regiment, who had their barracks close to the site of the bridge. From 1829 it was called the Winter Bridge, after the canal it crossed. With the construction of a new bridge across the canal in 1940 it has been called the First Winter Bridge, to distinguish it from the Second Winter Bridge.

In 1955 the bridge underwent repairs to its stone vaulting and roadway, by Lengiproinzhproekt, and overseen by engineer B. B. Levin. The bridge has preserved its architectural appearance unchanged since the 18th century, and has been designated an object of historical and cultural heritage of federal significance.
