= Red Canal =

Former canal in Saint Petersburg

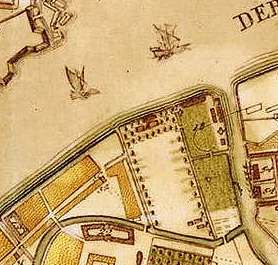
The Red Canal on a 1737 map of the city. The canal runs to the left of the leftmost line of trees in the centre, the location of the present-day Field of Mars.

Red Canal (Russian: Красный канал, romanized: Krasny kanal) was an eighteenth-century waterway in Saint Petersburg. Built between 1711 and 1719, it was part of a series of canals dug to improve the drainage of the marshy areas of the city. The canal was one of two connecting the Moyka River and the Neva River in the area of what is now the Field of Mars. Opened in the presence of Peter the Great and Tsarina Catherine in 1719, the canal became a popular site for the nobility to construct large townhouses. By the 1770s the canal was no longer required for its original purpose, and with the expansion of buildings across the Neva embankment, the canal was filled in. A stone bridge built over the canal in 1768 was transferred to the Winter Canal, and survives today as the First Winter Bridge.

== History ==
Digging of the canal began in 1711, running between the Moyka River and the Neva River for the purpose of draining the surrounding marshy areas. It was one of two canals dug in the area between 1711 and 1721. The other, later known as the Swan Canal, was dug parallel to the Red Canal along a shallow swampy river called the Lebedinka (Russian: Лебединка). Together the two canals created an island, enclosing a roughly rectangular parcel of land, initially called simply Pustoi (Russian: Пустой), meaning "Empty" - after the trees that grew here were felled, and from the 1720s, the "Great Meadow" (Russian: Большой Луг), and in the present, the Field of Mars. The Red Canal was officially opened on 21 October 1719, in the presence of Peter the Great and Tsarina Catherine. During its early years the canal was spanned by a wooden drawbridge. From 1738 it became known as the Red Canal, after the nearby Red Bridge, now Theatre Bridge and part of the Tripartite Bridge across the Moyka. There was a small canal basin in the area of what is now Millionnaya Street. The second post house in the city was built close to the Red Canal's junction with the Neva in 1715, but burned down in 1735.

With the completion of the Red Canal, the western edge of the Big Meadow became a popular site for the nobility to construct large townhouses. Those that settled in the area included Charles Frederick, Duke of Holstein-Gottorp, Alexander Rumyantsev, Adam Veyde, and Pavel Yaguzhinsky, and Peter the Great's daughter, Elizabeth Petrovna. In 1768, a single-span stone arched bridge was built to carry Bolshaya Nemetskaya Street, now Millionnaya Street, over the canal. The bridge was designed by Yury Felten and I. G. Rossi, with its construction supervised by engineer T. I. Nasonov.

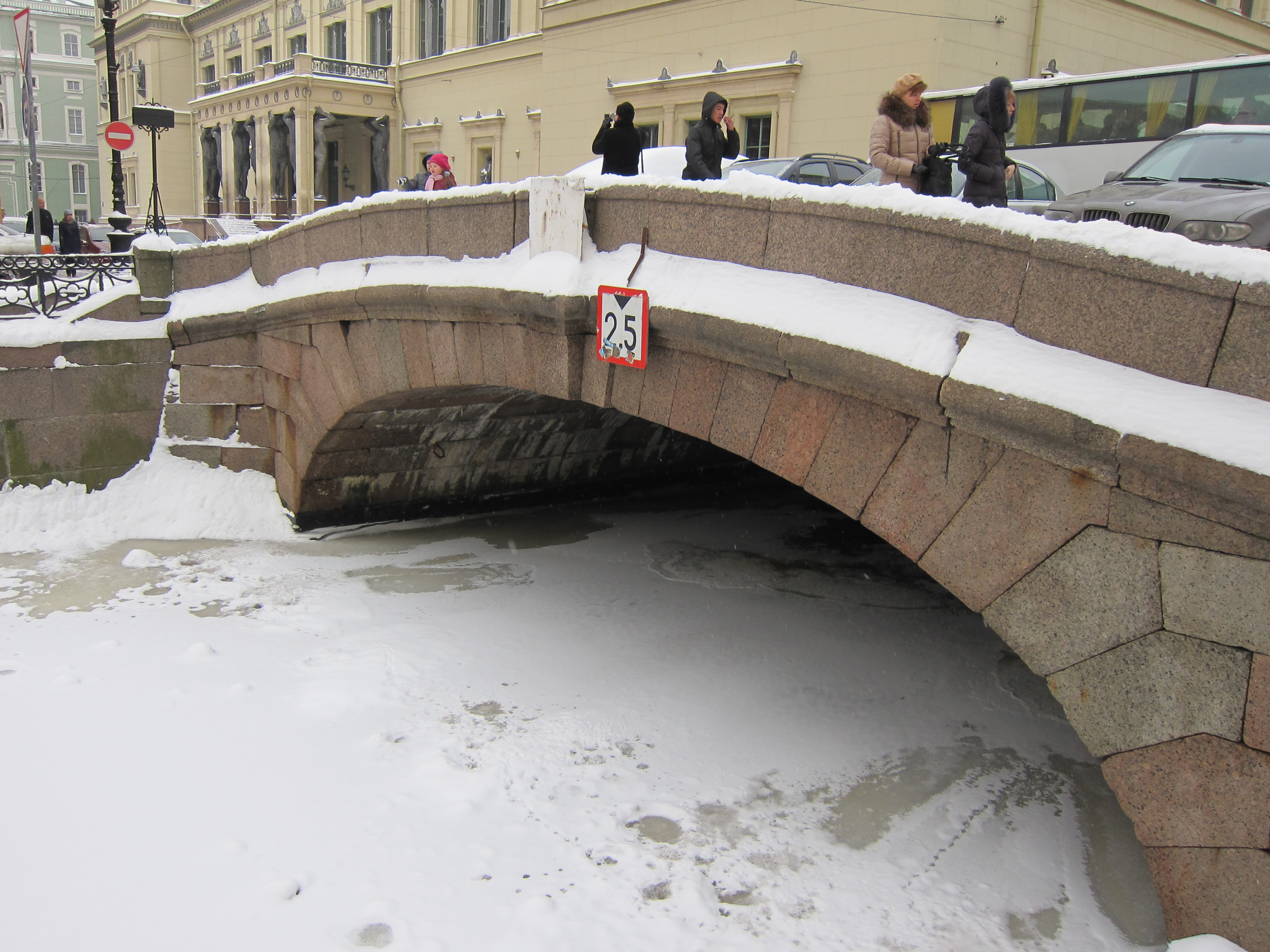
The First Winter Bridge, formerly a crossing on the Red Canal

Antonio Rinaldi's Marble Palace was built to the west of the Red Canal between 1768 and 1785, with work beginning on the palace's service wing in the 1780 to a design by Peter Yegorov. Rinaldi had separated the palace's main building from the canal by means of a decorative wall, but the canal crossed the proposed site of the service wing. With the canal no longer necessary for drainage purposes, it was filled in in the late 1770s to allow the construction of the wing to begin. With the filling of the canal, the meadow ceased to be an island. The stone bridge crossing the former canal was dismantled between 1783 and 1784 and delivered in pieces to the nearby Winter Canal, where it was rebuilt. It survives today as the First Winter Bridge.
