= List of canals in Russia =

This is a list of navigable canals that are at least partially located in Russia.

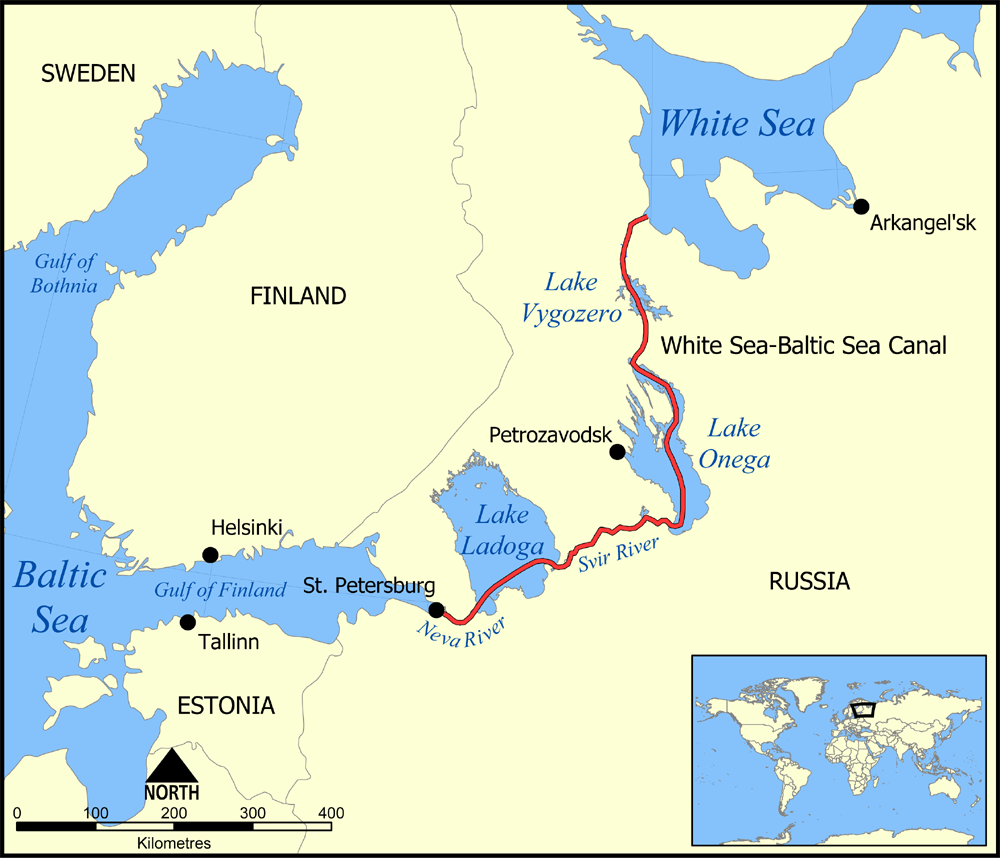
A map of the White Sea – Baltic Waterway, including the Neva and Svir Rivers and the canal

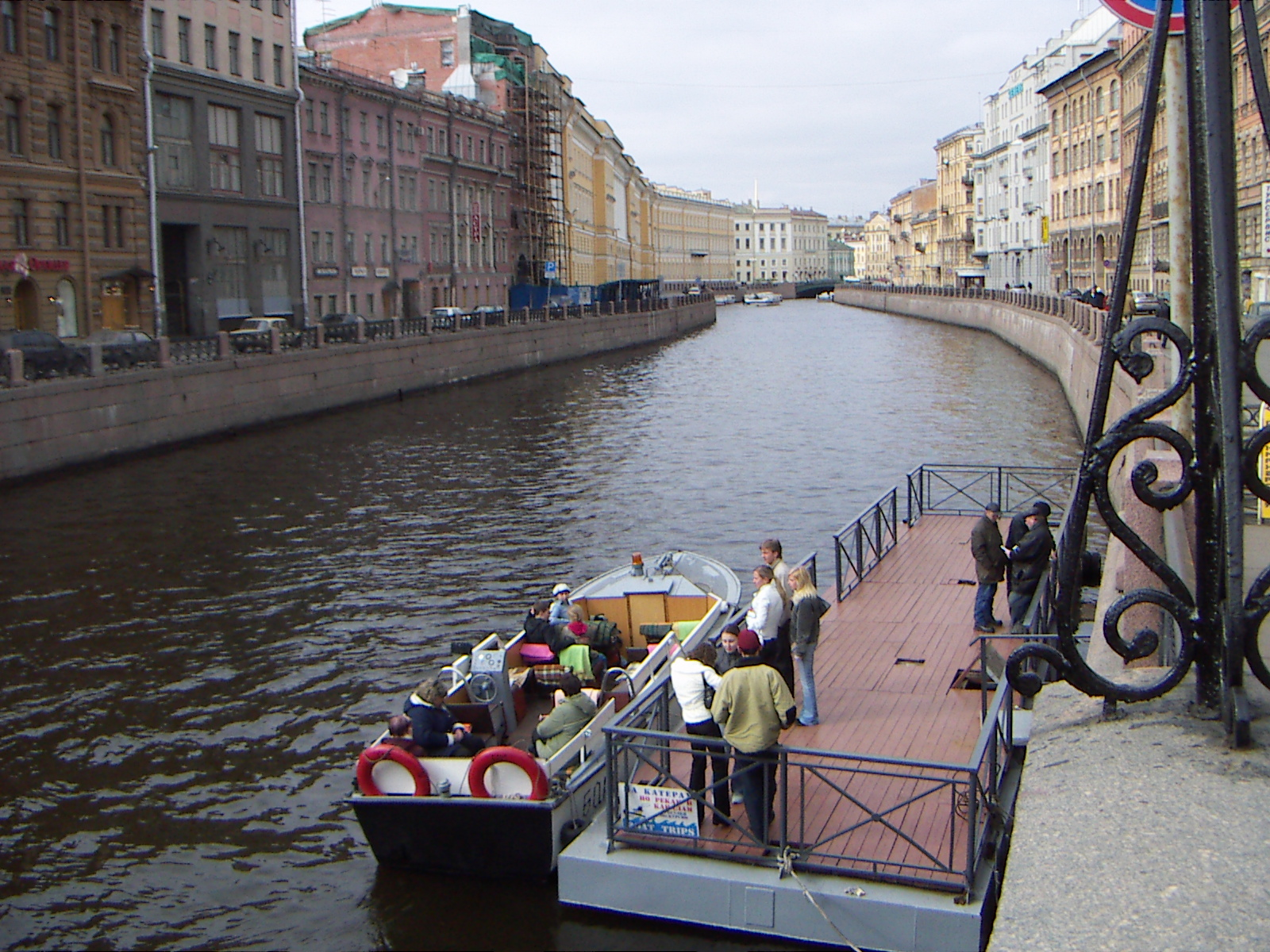
View of the Moyka from the Green Bridge of the Nevsky Prospekt

| Canal name (English) | Canal name (Russia) | Length |
|---|---|---|
| Eurasia Canal | Канал Евразия (Kanal "Evraziya") | 700km (proposed) |
| Griboyedov Canal | Канал Грибоедова (Kanal Griboedova) | 5km |
| Kronverksky Strait | Кронверкский пролив (Kronverkskiy proliv) | 1km |
| Kuma–Manych Canal | Кумо–Манычский канал (Kumo-Manychskiy kanal) | |
| Ladoga Canal | Лaдожский канал (Ladozhskiy kanal) | 117km |
| Ligovsky Canal | Лиговский канал (Ligovskiy kanal) | 23km |
| Manych Ship Canal | Манычский судоходный канал (Manychskiy Sudohodniy kanal) | |
| Moscow Canal | Канал имени Москвы (Kanal imeni Moskvy) | 128.1km |
| Nevinnomyssk Canal | Невинномысский канал (Nevinnomysskij kanal) | 49.2km |
| Northern Dvina Canal | Cеверо-Двинский канал (Severo-Dvinskiy kanal) | 127km |
| Northern Ekaterininsky Canal | Cеверо-Екатерининский канал (Severo-Yekaterininskiy kanal) | 17.6km |
| Ob–Yenisei Canal | Обь-Енисейский канал (Ob'-Eniseiskiy kanal) | 8km |
| Obvodny Canal | Обводный канал (Obvodniy kanal) | 8km |
| Onega Canal | Онежский канал (Onejskiy kanal) | 67km |
| Pechora–Kama Canal | Канал Печора-Кама (Kanal Pechora-Kama) | |
| Red Canal | Красный канал (Krasny kanal) | |
| Saimaa Canal | Сайменский канал (Saimenskiy kanal) | 42.9km |
| Swan Canal | Лебяжья канавка (Lebyazhya kanavka) | 0.648km |
| Vodootvodny Canal | Водоотводный канал (Vodoothodniy kanal) | 4km |
| Volga–Baltic Waterway | Мариинская водная система (Mariinskaya Vodnaya Sistema) | 369km |
| Volga–Don Canal | Волго–Донской судоходный канал имени В. И. Ленина (Volgo-Donskoy sudohodniy kanal imeni V.I.Lenina) | 101km |
| White Sea – Baltic Canal | Беломорско-Балтийский канал (Belomorsko-Baltiyskiy kanal) | 227km |
| Winter Canal | Зимняя канавка (Zimnyaya Kanavka) | 0.228km |

== See also ==
- Transport in Russia
- List of rivers of Russia
- Unified Deep Water System of European Russia
