= Winter Canal =

Canal in Russia

Coordinates: 59°56′32″N 30°19′03″E

Winter Canal Зимняя Канавка
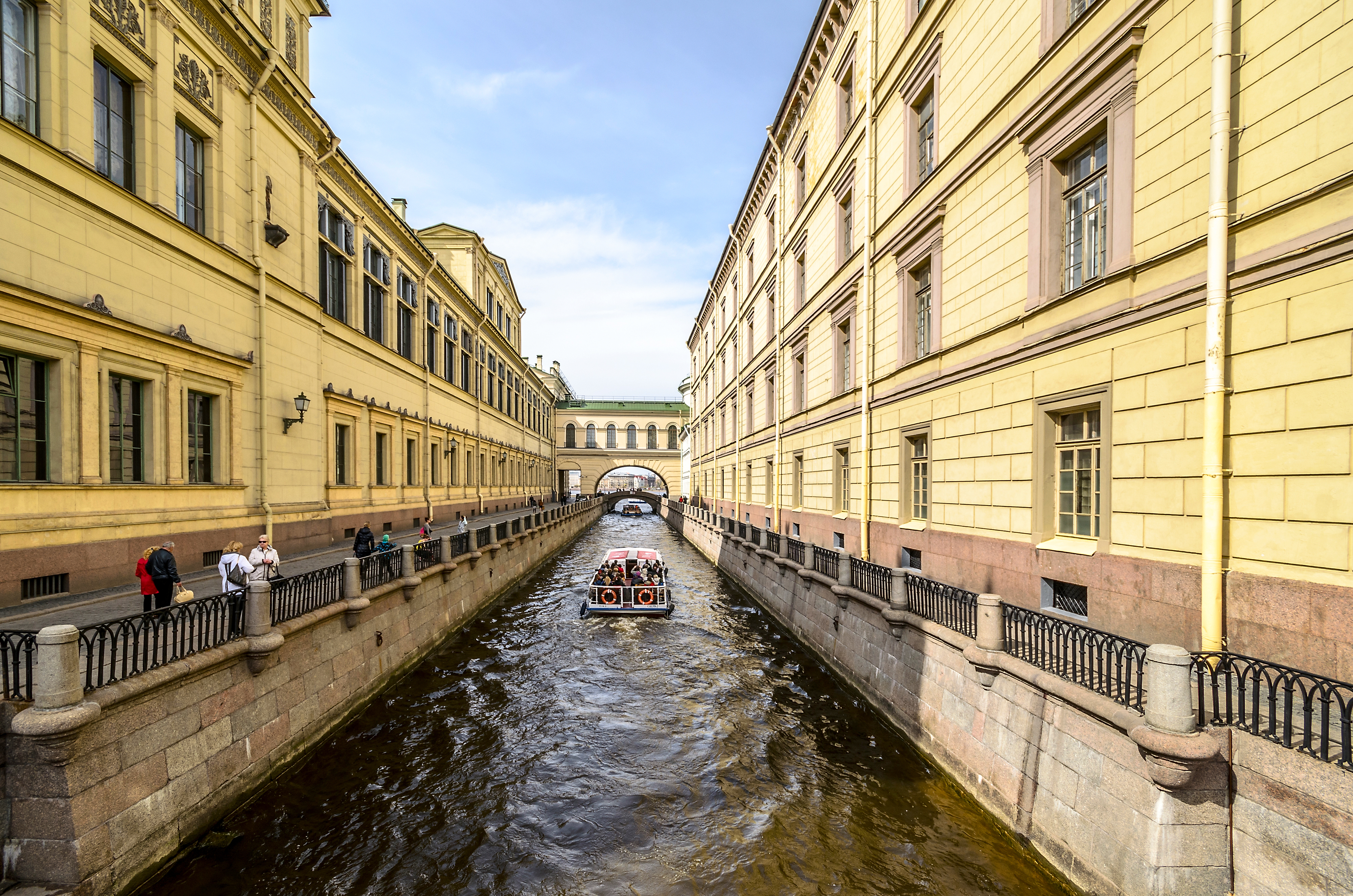
- View on Winter Canal towards Neva River
- Interactive map of Winter Canal; Зимняя Канавка

History
- Date completed: 1719

Geography
- Start point: Great Neva
- End point: Moyka

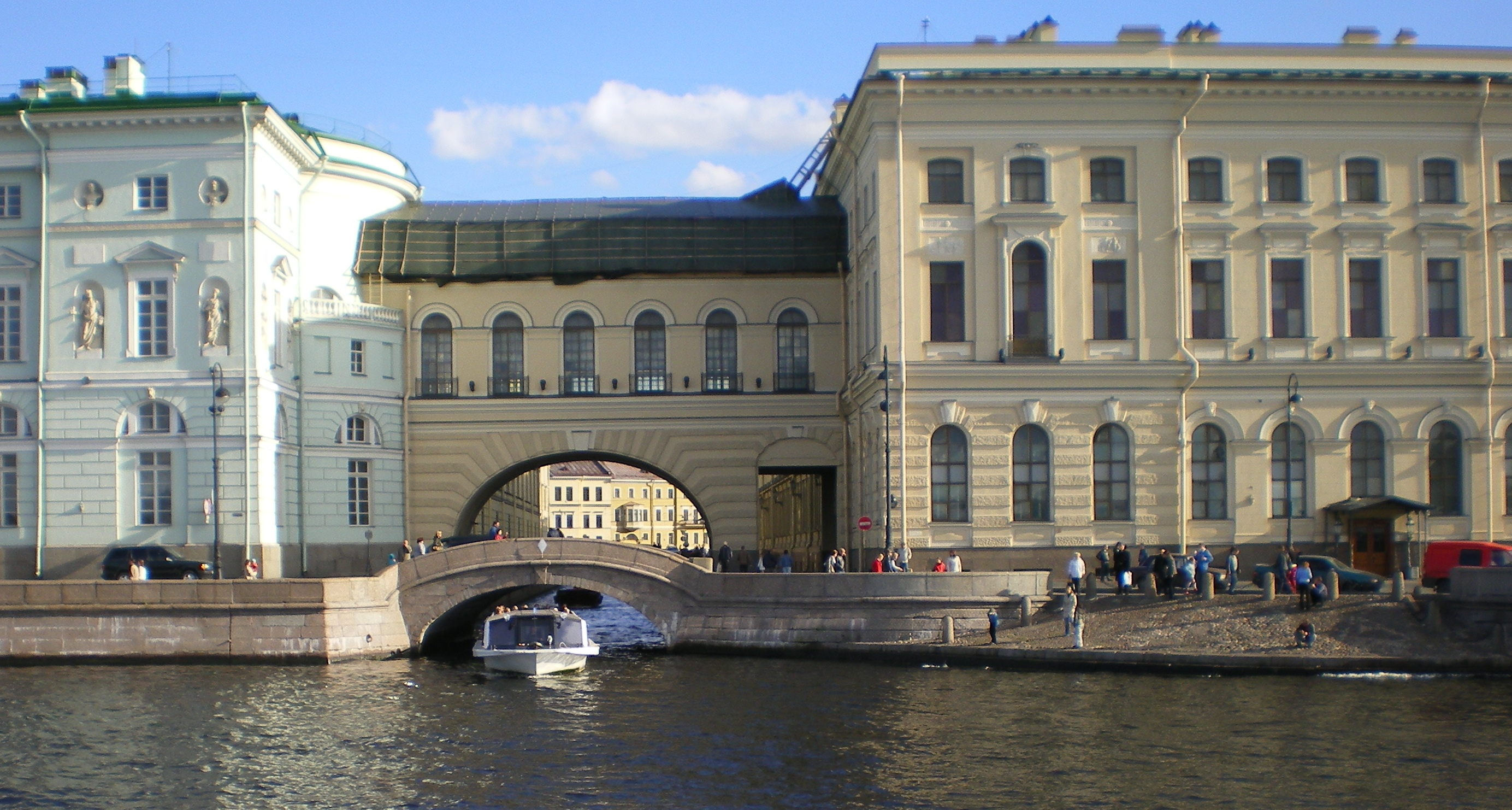
View on entrance into Winter Canal from the Neva River. Both Hermitage Bridge and the arch are visible.

Winter Canal (Russian: Зимняя канавка, Zimnyaya kanavka) is a canal in Saint Petersburg, Russia, connecting Bolshaya Neva with Moika River in the vicinity of Winter Palace.

The canal was dug in 1718–19. It is only 228 metres (748 ft) long, which makes it one of the shortest canals in the city. The width is about 20 metres (66 ft).

The granite embankment was built in 1782–84, and railings designed by sculptor I.F.Dunker were added at the same time. The special picturesqueness to the canal is added by the arch connecting Old Hermitage and Hermitage Theater, built by architect Yury Felten next to the Hermitage Bridge.

== Names ==
Originally the canal was named Old Palace Canal (Russian: Старый Дворцовый канал). From 1780 it was called either Winter House Canal (Russian: Зимнедомский) or Winter Palace Canal (Russian: Зимнедворцовый). Townspeople started to call it simply Russian: Зимний канал (meaning Winter Canal), and in 1828 the canal was officially renamed to its current name – Winter Canal (pronounced in Russian as Zimnyaya Kanavka, literally meaning Winter Groove).

== Bridges ==
There are three bridges across Winter Canal:

- Hermitage Bridge (along Palace Embankment)
- First Winter Bridge (along Millionnaya Street)
- Second Winter Bridge (along Moika River Embankment)
