= Kutuzov Embankment =

Street in Saint Petersburg, Russia

Coordinates: 59.9487°N 30.34°E

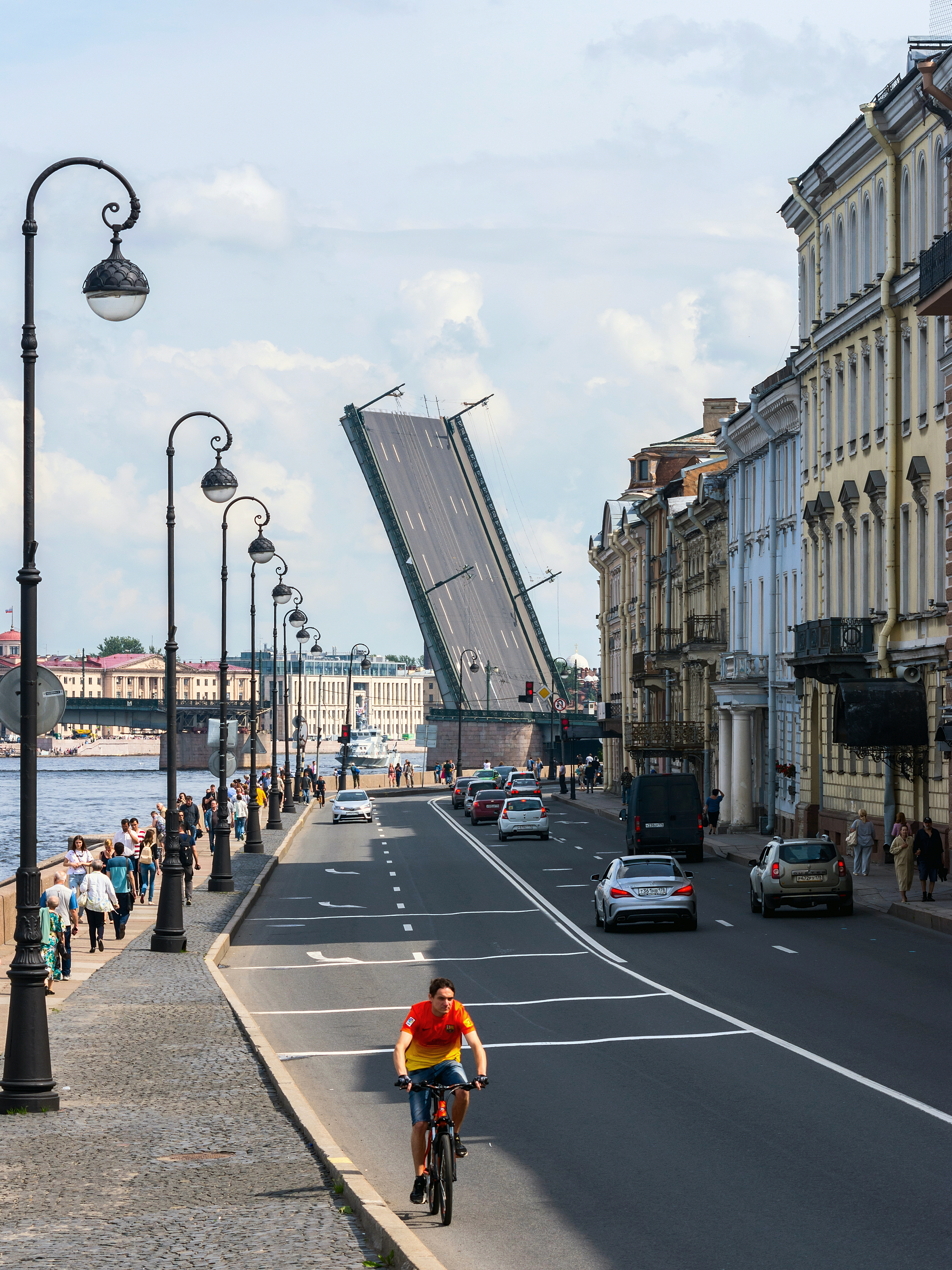
The Kutuzov Embankment.

The Kutuzov Embankment or Kutuzov Quay (Russian: Набережная Кутузова, Naberezhnaya Kutuzova) is a street along the Neva River in Central Saint Petersburg, Russia. The street begins at the Fontanka, where the Palace Embankment becomes the Kutuzov Embankment, and the street ends at Liteyny Prospekt and Liteyny Bridge. It was known as the French Embankment in the beginning of the 19th century, as the French Embassy used to be located on the street. The street was later named after Prince M. I. Kutuzov, who began his successful campaign against Napoleon Bonaparte during the French invasion of Russia on the embankment.
