= Palace Embankment =

Historic riverside street in St. Petersburg, Russia

Coordinates: 59.941232°N 30.312629°E

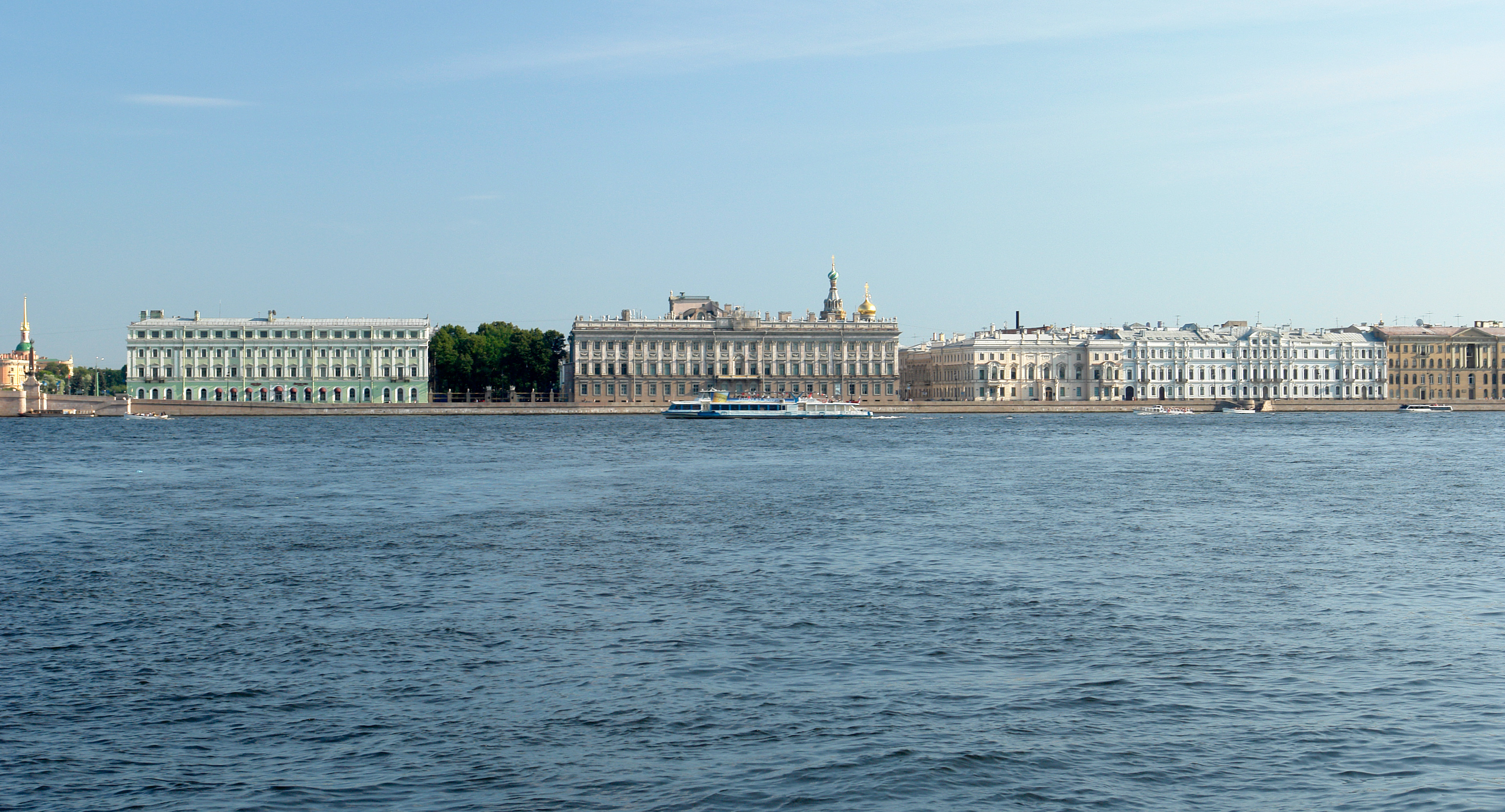
The Palace Quay, as seen from the Peter and Paul Fortress

The Palace Embankment or Palace Quay (Russian: Дворцовая набережная, romanized: Dvortsovaya naberezhnaya) is a street along the Neva River in Central Saint Petersburg, Russia, which contains the complex of the Hermitage Museum buildings (including the Winter Palace), the Hermitage Theatre, the New Michael Palace, the Saltykov Mansion and the Summer Garden.

The embankment was wooden up to 1761, when Catherine the Great ordered court architect Yury Felten to build stone embankments. The street as seen nowadays was laid out between 1763 and 1767, when it used to be a preferred place of residence for the Russian nobility. The street begins at the Palace Bridge, where the Admiralty Embankment becomes the Palace Embankment, and the street ends at the Fontanka, where it becomes the Kutuzov Embankment.

The Palace Embankment is one of the main places of interest in the city as it offers a wonderful view of the Neva, the Peter and Paul Fortress and Vasilievsky Island.

== Notable locations ==
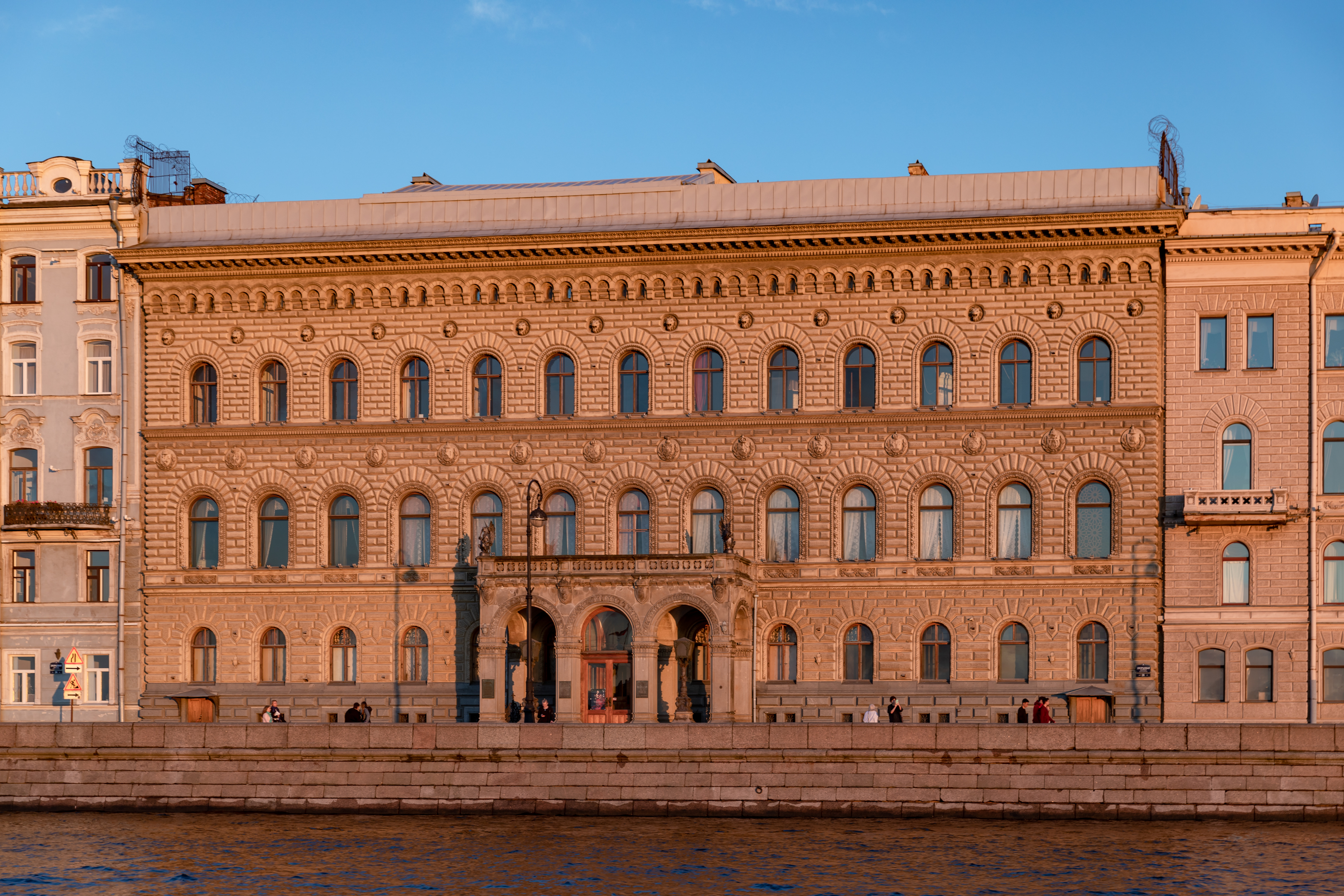
Vladimir palace (house No. 26), 1874

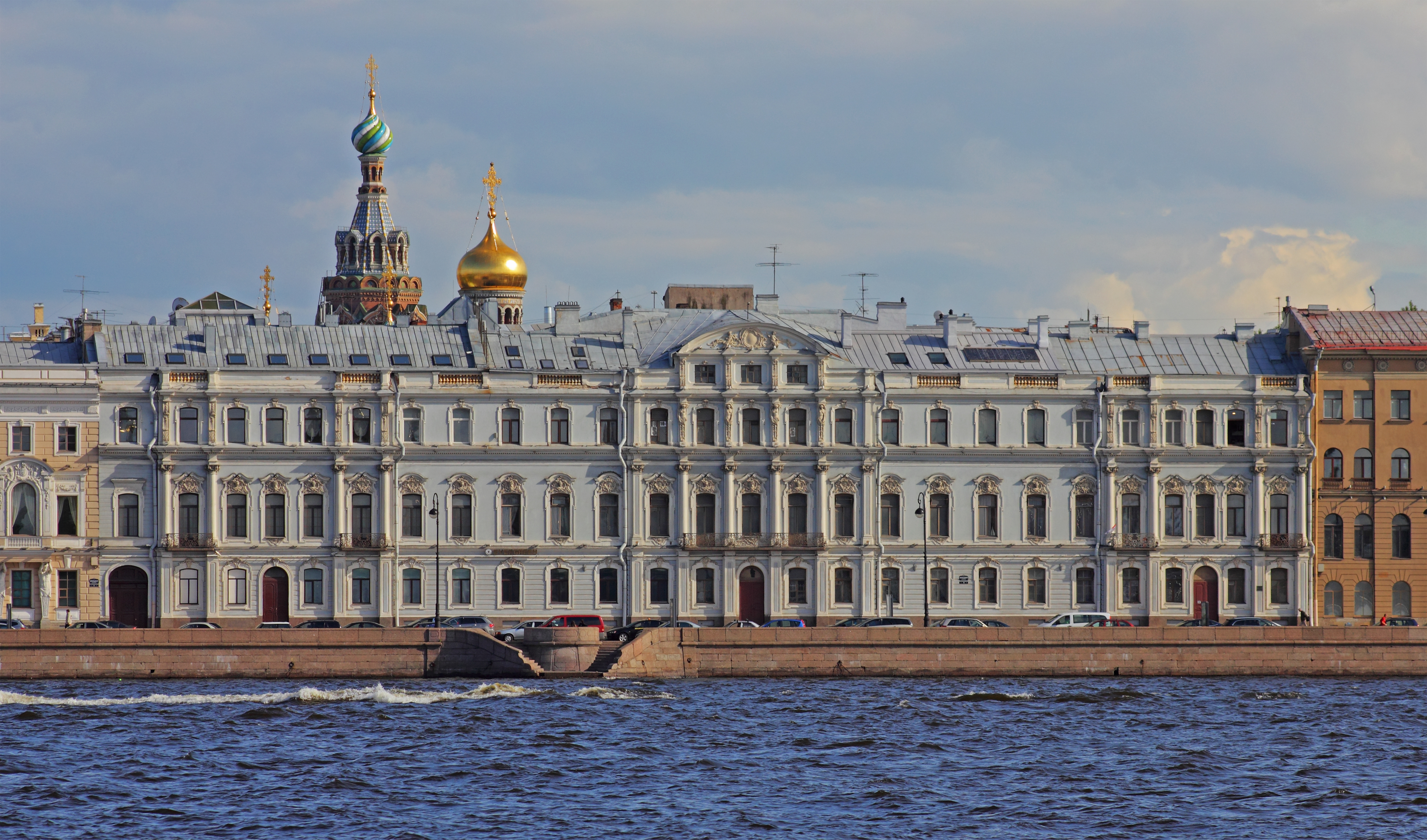
Gagarina (Zherebtsova) mansion

- Prachechny Bridge
- Summer Garden
- Upper Swan Bridge
- No. 2 — Mansion of Ivan Betskoy
- No. 4 — Saltykov Mansion
- No. 5/1 (Millionnaya st.) — the Marble Palace, built by Antonio Rinaldi for Catherine's favourite Grigory Orlov. Since 1992 the palace is a part of the Russian Museum.
- No. 6 — Service corps of the Marble Palace
- No. 8 — Gromov's mansion
- No. 10 — Gagarina (Zherebtsova) mansion
- No. 18 — New Michael Palace
- No. 26 — former Grand Duke Vladimir Aleksandrovich palace, 1860s, built by Alexander Rezanov. Nowadays it known as the House of Scientists.
- No. 30 — Sklyaev Mansion
- Hermitage Bridge
- No. 32 — Hermitage Theatre
- Great Hermitage
- Small Hermitage
- No. 38 — the Winter Palace
- Gardens of the Winter Palace

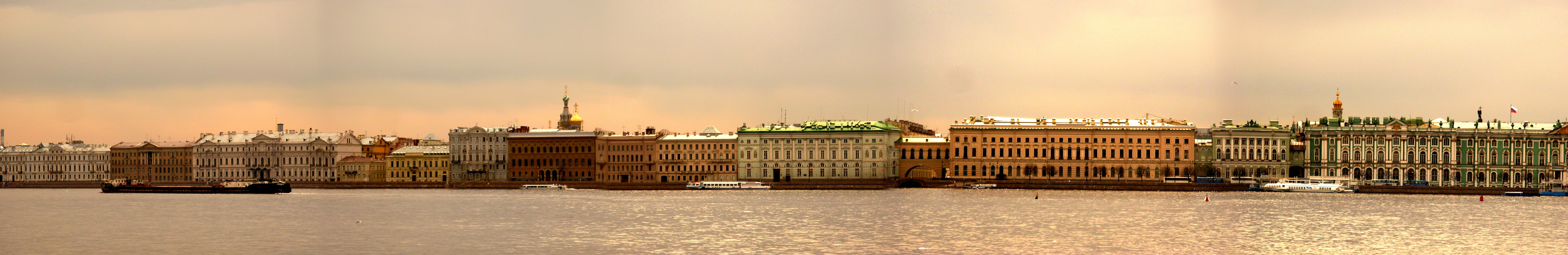
Palace Embankment panorama

== Pushkin associations ==
In his novel Eugene Onegin, Alexander Pushkin depicted himself walking along Palace Quay with his hero, Eugene Onegin:

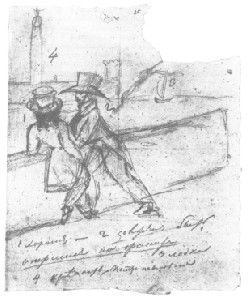
Pushkin's sketch representing himself and Onegin on Palace Quay

Filled with his heart's regrets, and leaning
Against the rampart's granite shelf,
Eugene stood lost in pensive dreaming
(As once some poet drew himself).
The night grew still... with silence falling;
Only the sound of sentries calling,
Or suddenly from Million Street
Some distant droshky's rumbling beat;
Or floating on a drowsy river,
A lonely boat would sail along,
While far away some rousing song
Or plaintive horn would make us shiver.
But sweeter still, amid such nights,
Are Tasso's octaves' soaring flights.

For the first edition of this chapter, the poet commissioned an illustration depicting him and Onegin walking together along the quay. Upon receiving the illustration, which represented him leaning on a parapet with his back turned towards the Peter and Paul Fortress, he was exceedingly displeased with the result (which had little in common with his own preliminary sketch, illustrated to the right) and scribbled the following epigram underneath (here in translation by Vladimir Nabokov):

Here, after crossing Bridge Kokushkin,
With bottom on the granite propped,
Stands Aleksandr Sergeich Pushkin;
Near M'sieur Onegin he has stopped.
Ignoring with a look superior
The fateful Power's citadel,
On it he turns a proud posterior:
My dear chap, poison not the well!

== Sources ==
- Cross, Anthony (2010). A Corner of a Foreign Field: The British Embassy in St Petersburg, 1863–1918. MHRA. ISBN 9781907322037.
- Nabokov, Vladimir (1964). Eugene Onegin: Commentary and index. Princeton University Press. ISBN 0691019045
- Pushkin, Alexander (1995). Eugene Onegin: A Novel in Verse. Oxford: Oxford University Press. ISBN 0192838997.
- Shvidkovsky, D. S. (2007). Russian architecture and the West. Yale University Press. ISBN 978-0-300-10912-2.
