= Central Saint Petersburg =

Coordinates: 59°56′21″N 30°18′57″E

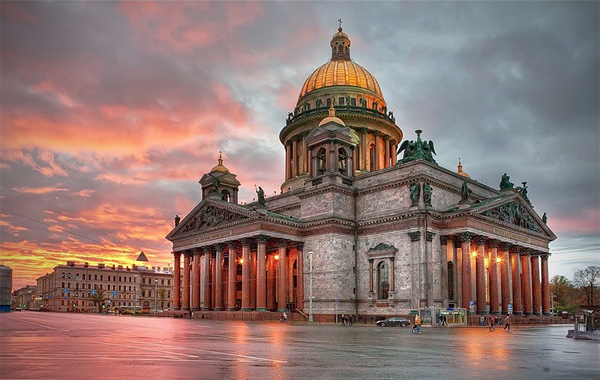
Saint Isaac's Cathedral

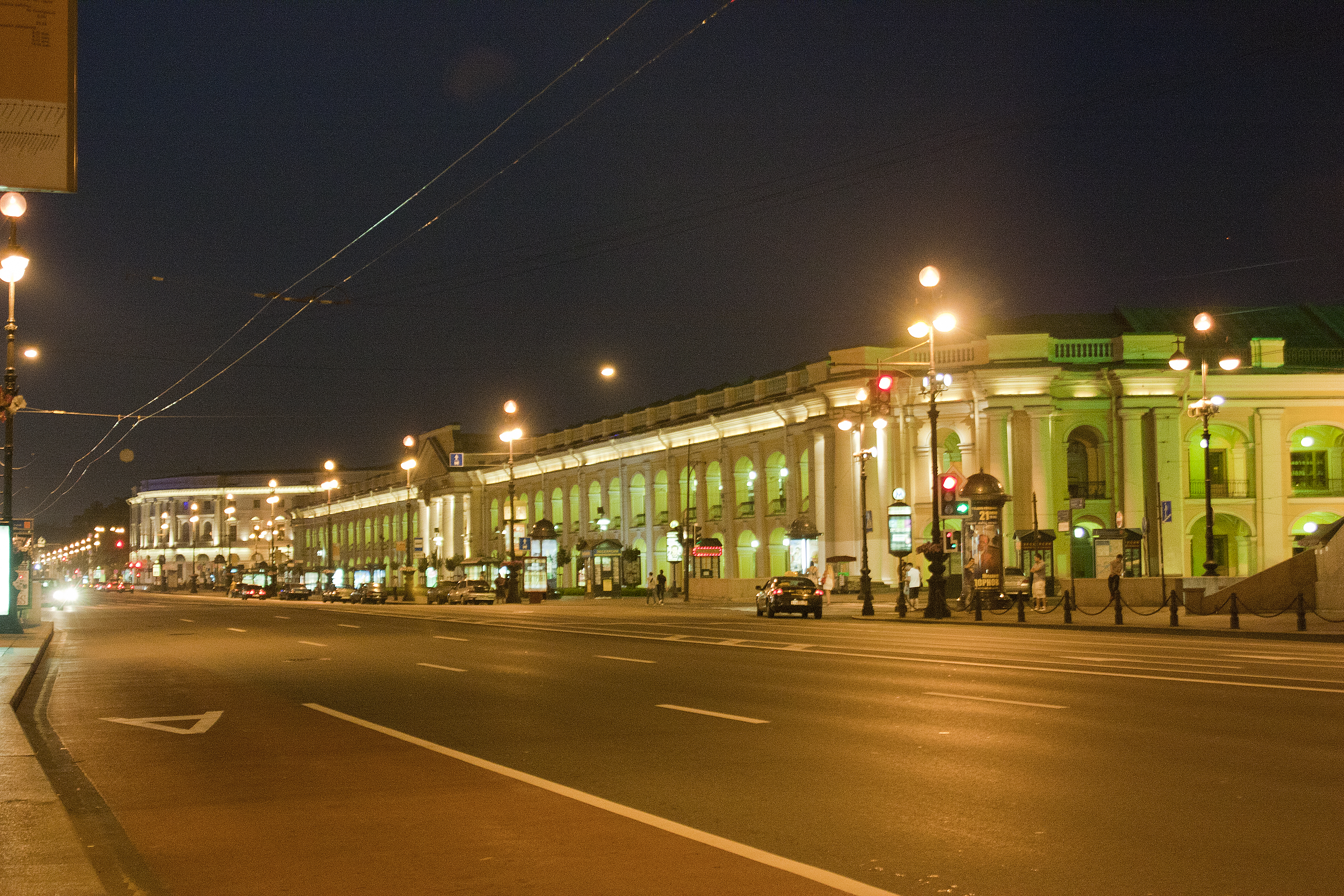
Great Gostiny Dvor

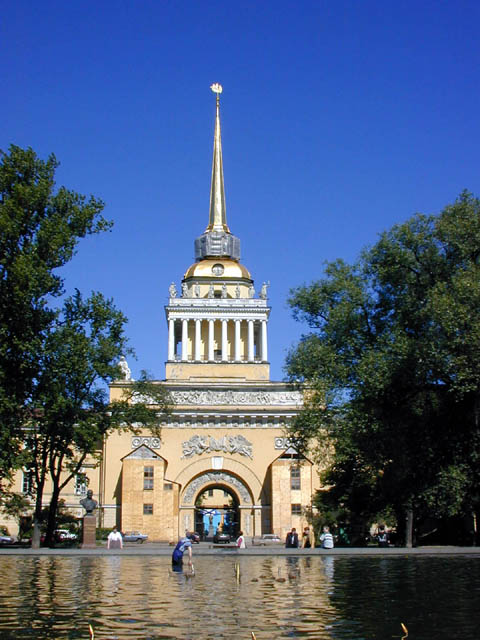
The Admiralty Tower

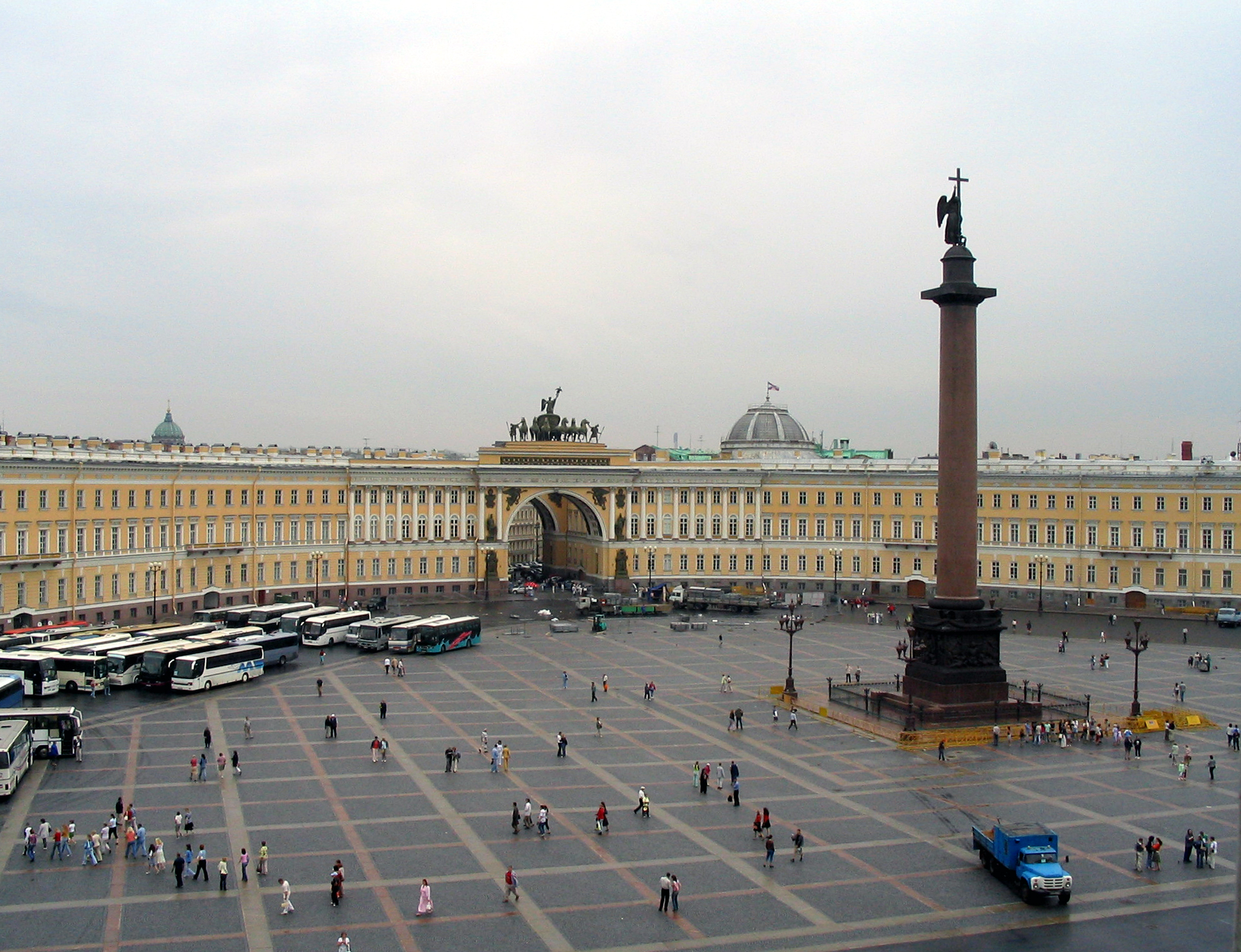
Palace Square

Central Saint Petersburg is the central business district of Saint Petersburg, Russia. It has no skyscrapers. Its main borders are Neva River to the north and west, and the Fontanka River to the south and east, but the downtown includes areas outside.

== History ==
It is the oldest part of the city after the Peter and Paul Fortress. When people populated Saint Petersburg, they built their houses around the almost only building outside the fortress; the Admiralty building. The largest industry was shipbuilding. The first residence of Peter the Great was the Cabin of Peter the Great, which is now a museum. Later, the Summer Palace (1744) and the Winter Palace (1732) were built. The central part of the city was supposed to be between the Peter and Paul Fortress and his first house.

== Overview ==
The CBS is an area with many old buildings and has parks including the Summer Garden, Field of Mars and Mikhailovsky Garden. It is also the wealthiest area in Saint Petersburg and includes luxury hotels such as Hotel Astoria and Grand Hotel Europe. It has always been a wealthy district since the rich noble Russians built their mansions here.

Administratively, the Saint Petersburg central business district falls under the authority of Tsentralny and the Admiralteysky Districts.

The CBS is also a main traffic hub, with tramways, trolleybuses, buses, and the Moscow Rail Terminal.

== Streets and squares ==
Significant streets are Nevsky Prospekt, the heart of the city, and is one of the largest shopping streets in Europe, with department stores including Great Gostiny Dvor and The Passage. It also includes the Kazan Cathedral and Anichkov Palace.

Sadovaya Street is a main street in downtown with high traffic, and includes Yusupov Palace, Apraksin Dvor department store, and crossing the Sennaya Square; a main square, with entertainment, commercial and many shops.

St Isaac's Square includes the St Isaac's Cathedral and Mariinsky Palace, and has a monument dedicated to tsar Nicholas I of Russia.

On the other side of the cathedral is the Decembrists Square, next to the Admiralty building, and the location of the Bronze Horseman.

Palace Square includes the Winter Palace and the Hermitage.

Arts Square includes the Russian Museum, the Mikhaylovsky Theatre, the Large Concert Hall (Bolshoi Zal) of the Saint Petersburg Philharmonic Orchestra, the Pushkin monument and is not far from the Church of the Savior on Blood.

The Theatre Square includes the Mariinsky Theatre.

== See also ==
- Historic Centre of Saint Petersburg and Related Groups of Monuments
