= Second Winter Bridge =

Bridge in Saint Petersburg, Russia

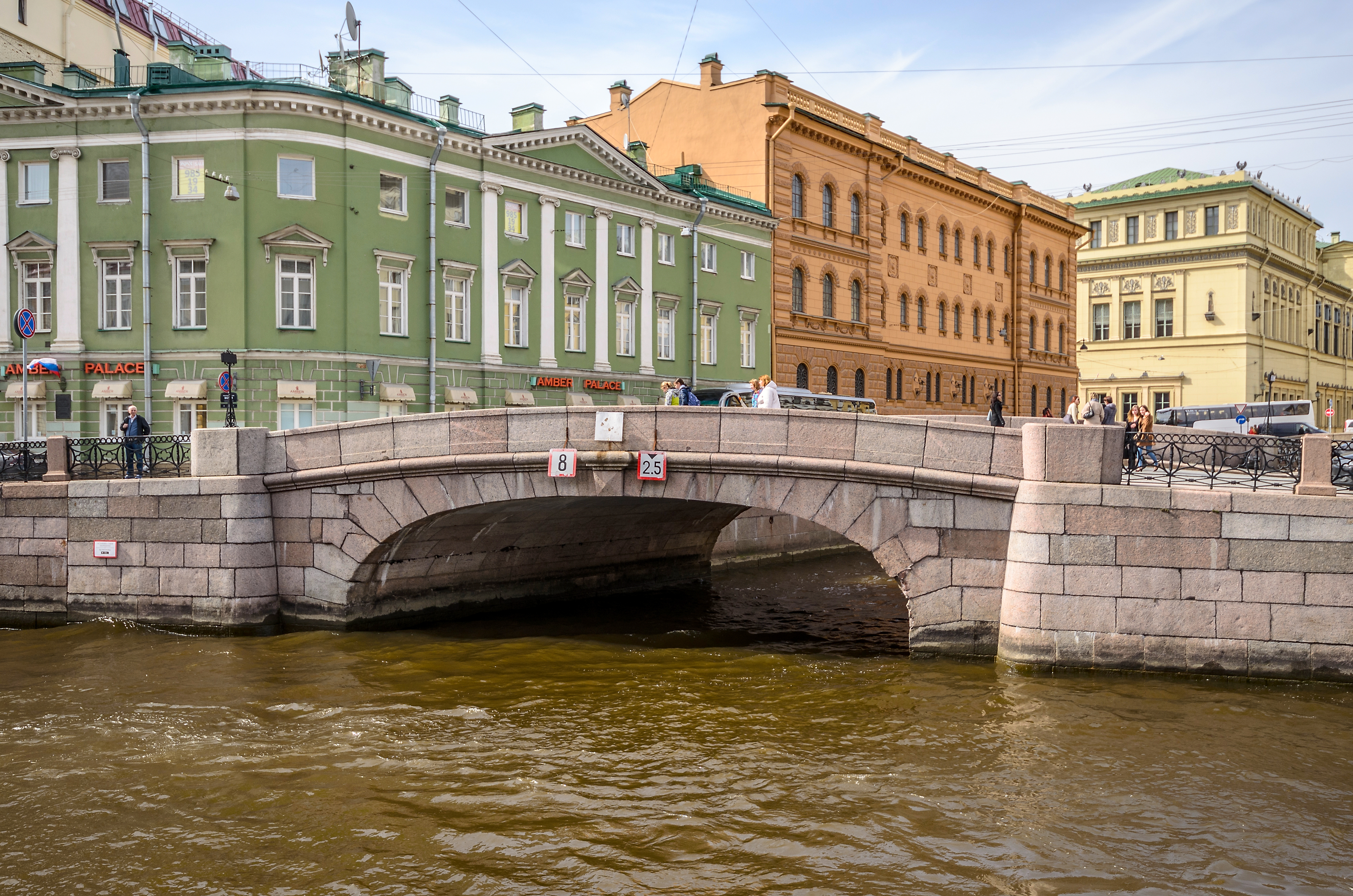
- Coordinates: 59°56′27″N 30°19′10″E
- Crosses: Winter Canal
- Locale: Tsentralny District of Saint Petersburg

Characteristics
- Design: hingeless arch
- Total length: 20.5 m
- Width: 10 m
- Traversable?: pedestrian, automobile

History
- Opening: 1940, 1964 (reconstruction)

The Second Winter Bridge is a bridge across the Winter Canal. The bridge connects 1st and 2nd Admiralty Islands which are in the Tsentralny District of Saint Petersburg.

== Location ==
The bridge is at the right (odd) embankment of the Moyka River between house numbers 31 and 35.

Upstream is the First Winter Bridge.

The nearest metro station is "Admiralteyskaya."

== Name ==
The name of the bridge has been well-known since 1940.

== History ==
In 1940 a single-span wooden balcony bridge was built for passing festive demonstrations from the Palace Square.

In 1964 the bridge was rebuilt into a single-span arch with a solid reinforced concrete vault according to the design of engineer V. S. Ksenofontov and architect L. A. Noskov.

== Construction ==
Second Winter Bridge is a single-span arch bridge. The superstructure is made oblique (the Winter Canal flows into the Moyka river at an angle) in plan and has a solid reinforced concrete hinged vault. The supports of the bridge are made of monolithic reinforced concrete on a pile foundation. The bridge length is 20.5 m. The bridge width is 10 m. The facades of the bridge are covered with pink granite. Granite parapets are used as fences. The roadway and sidewalks are covered with asphalt concrete.

The bridge closely resembles the neighboring First Winter Bridge, thus completing the ensemble on the Winter Canal.

== See also ==
- List of bridges in Saint Petersburg
