= Hermitage Theatre =

Theatre in Saint Petersburg, Russia

Coordinates: 59.942614°N 30.317794°E

Interior of the Hermitage Theatre

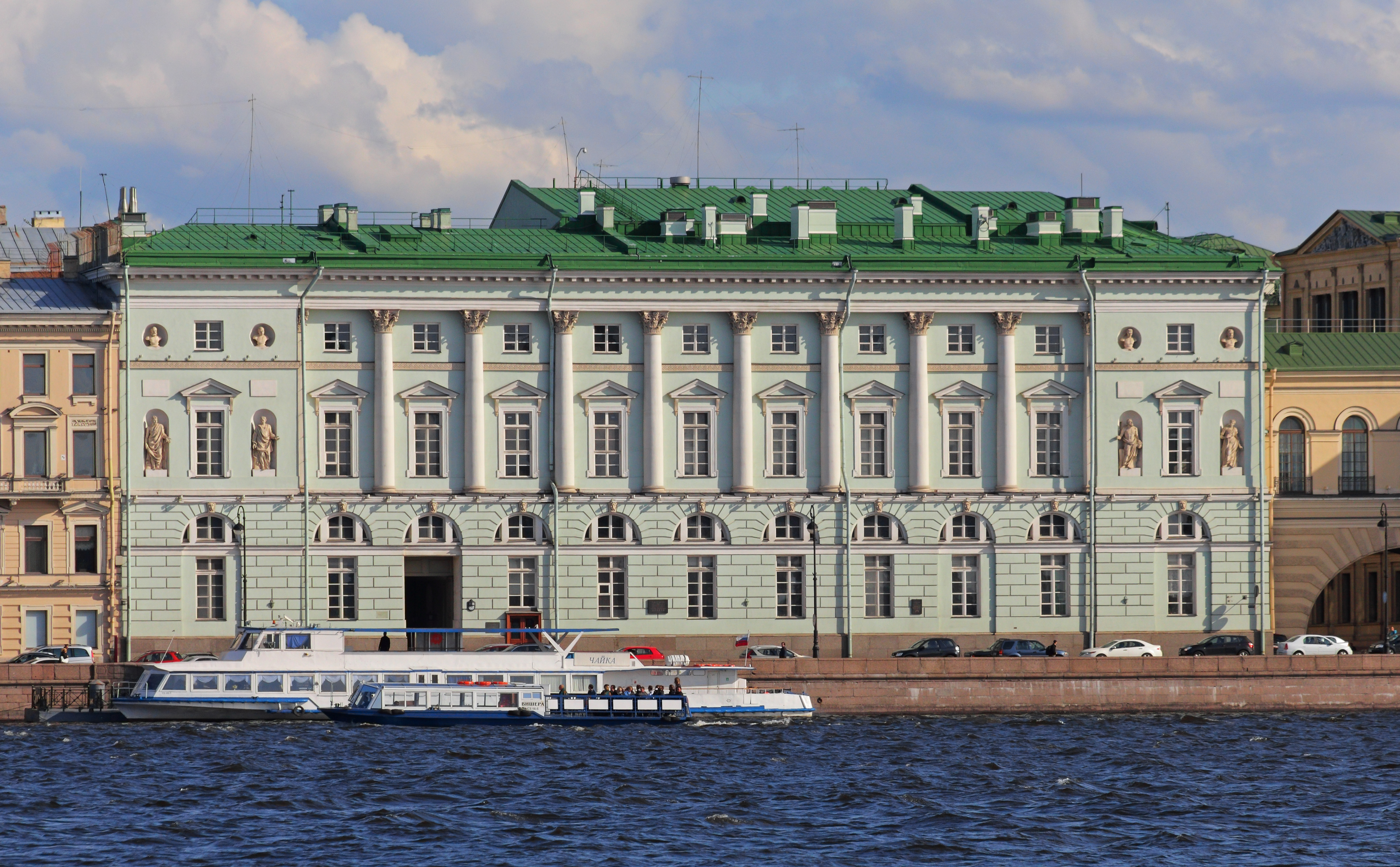
Hemitage Theatre on the Palace Embankment of Neva River

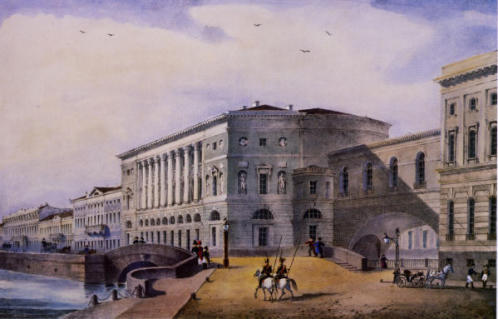
Hermitage Bridge in front of the theatre

The Hermitage Theatre (Russian: Эрмитажный театр, romanized: Ermitazhnyy teatr, IPA: [ɪrmʲɪˈtaʐnɨj tʲɪˈat(ə)r]) in Saint Petersburg, Russia is one of five Hermitage buildings lining the Palace Embankment of the Neva River.

The Hermitage Theatre was the second theatre of the Winter Palace. It replaced the Russian Imperial Theater, which operated from 1764 until 1783. The Hermitage Theatre was built between 1783 and 1787 at the behest of Catherine the Great to a Palladian design by Giacomo Quarenghi. The crumbling Third Winter Palace of Peter the Great was demolished to make room for the new structure, although its old foundations are still visible in the ground floor. Quarenghi's designs for the theatre were engraved and published in 1787, earning him a European reputation.

The semicircular auditorium is decorated with color marble and surrounded with ten niches for statues of Apollo and the muses. As the interior has never been overhauled, the original stage machinery remains in situ, but the elaborate sets, an acclaimed work of the Italian artist Pietro Gonzaga (1751-1831), were lost during the years of Soviet neglect.

The ceremonial opening of the theatre took place on 22 November 1785. Though the auditorium could seat no more than 250 spectators, it was often overcrowded. Usually, the performance would be attended by several dozen aristocratic spectators, all invited by the monarch herself. As a sign of gratitude, a separate loge was reserved for the architect Quarenghi and his family. In the 19th century, selected members of the diplomatic corps were admitted to the theatre as well.

Although the building was used to entertain the imperial family until the Russian Revolution, it came to be viewed as a rare monument to Catherine's personal tastes and affections. The empress brought out several comedies specifically to be staged in this theatre, which also saw the premieres of Domenico Cimarosa's operas composed to her own librettos. As for the costumes, they were chosen from a 15,000-dress personal wardrobe of the late Empress Elizabeth.

Mathilde Kschessinska, Anna Pavlova, and Fyodor Chaliapin were among the great artists who performed at the Hermitage Theatre for the last Russian tsar. Among the ballets performed there was the premiere of Marius Petipa's Harlequinade, in 1900. The Bolsheviks closed the theatre and utilised the building for administrative purposes. It was not until 1991 that performances were resumed on this stage, with the likes of Svyatoslav Richter, Mstislav Rostropovich and Yelena Obraztsova appearing as guest stars.
