= Field of Mars (Saint Petersburg) =

Square in Saint Petersburg, Russia

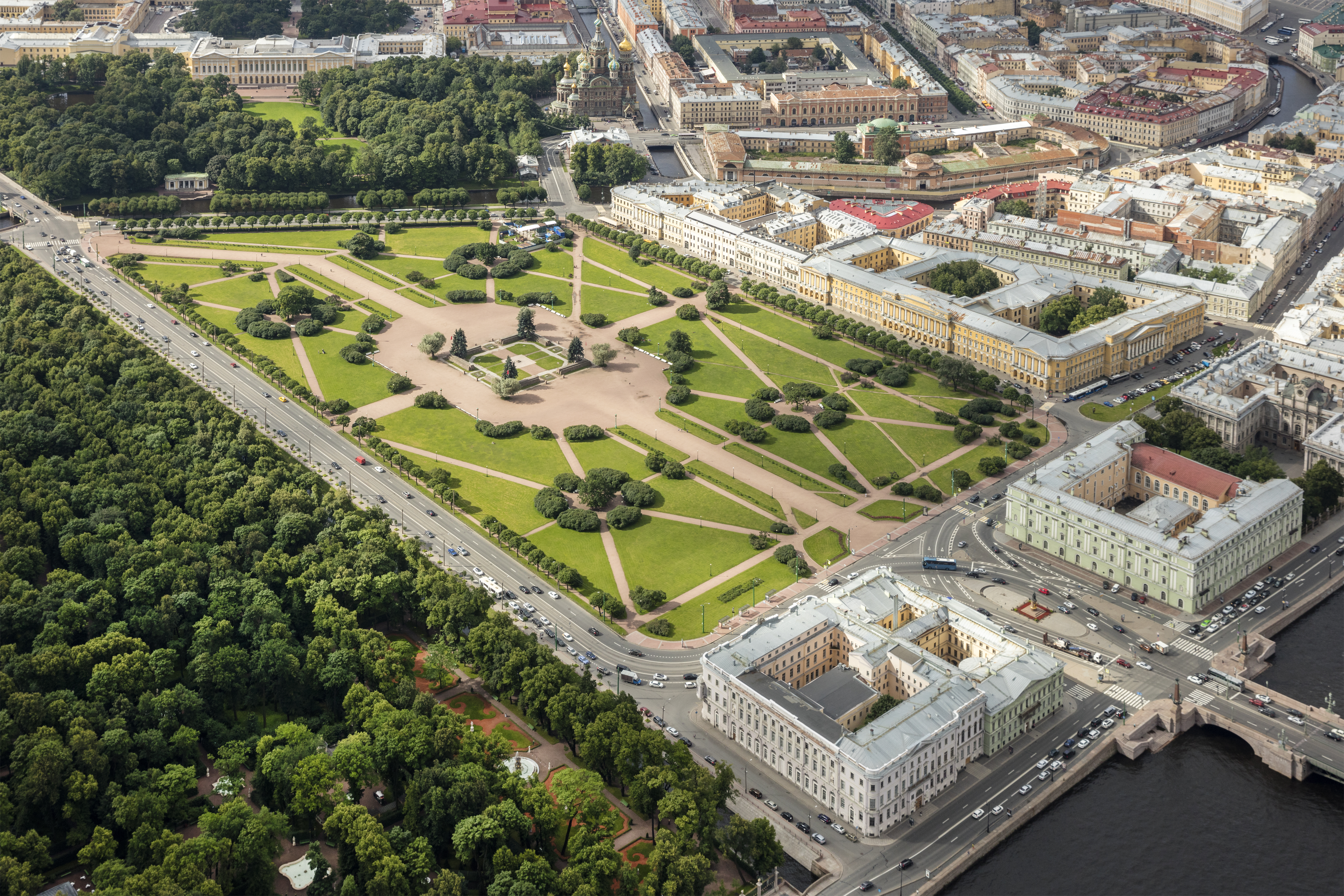
- Aerial view of the Field of Mars
- Interactive map of Field of Mars
- Type: Urban Park
- Location: Saint Petersburg, Russia
- Coordinates: 59.9436°N 30.3318°E
- Area: 9 hectares (22 acres)
- Open: All year

The Field of Mars (Russian: Ма́рсово по́ле, romanized: Marsovo Polye) is a large square in the centre of Saint Petersburg. Over its long history it has been alternately a meadow, park, pleasure garden, military parade ground, revolutionary pantheon and public meeting place.

The space now covered by the Field of Mars was initially an open area of swampy land between the developments around the Admiralty, and the imperial residence in the Summer Garden. It was drained by the digging of canals in the first half of the eighteenth century, and initially served as parkland, hosting a tavern, post office and the royal menagerie. Popular with the nobility, several leading figures of Petrine society established their town houses around the space in the mid eighteenth century. Under Peter the Great it was laid out with paths for walking and riding, and hosted military parades and festivals. During this period, and under Peter's successors it was called the "Empty Meadow" and the "Great Meadow". Empresses Anna and Elizabeth built their Summer Palaces here, and it was redeveloped into a pleasure park with pavilions and walkways for promenading. Theatres were built on the land during this period, and with the imperial patronage, the square became the "Tsaritsyn Meadow". New townhouses and palaces developed along the square's boundaries and across its frontage onto the Neva. During the reigns of Emperor Paul I and his son Alexander I, the square took on more of a martial purpose, with the construction of military monuments in the late eighteenth and early nineteenth centuries. In acknowledgement of this, and its role in hosting military reviews and parades, it was renamed the "Field of Mars" in 1805. (Renaming took place in 1818, not 1805, according to the Oxford Revised edition of War And Peace)

The square was part of the further development of the area by architect Carlo Rossi in the late 1810s, involving new buildings around the perimeter, and the extension of streets and frontages. During the nineteenth century the Field of Mars alternately hosted large military reviews, and public festivals. Sports and other leisure activities took place into the early twentieth century. After February 1917 the square became the ceremonial burial place of a number of those killed during the February Revolution. Construction of a memorial, the Monument to the Fighters of the Revolution, took place between 1917 and 1919 at the centre of the Field of Mars. The monument became the centre of an early pantheon of those who died in the service of the nascent Soviet state, and burials of some of the dead of the October Revolution and the Russian Civil War, as well as prominent figures in the government, took place between 1917 and 1933. Between 1918 and 1944 the Field of Mars was renamed the "Victims of the Revolution Square". The square was laid out with vegetable gardens to help feed the city during the siege of Leningrad, and also hosted an artillery battery. Restorations took place after the war, including the installation of the first eternal flame in Russia. In the post-Soviet period the Field of Mars has become a popular location for demonstrations and protests.

== Location ==
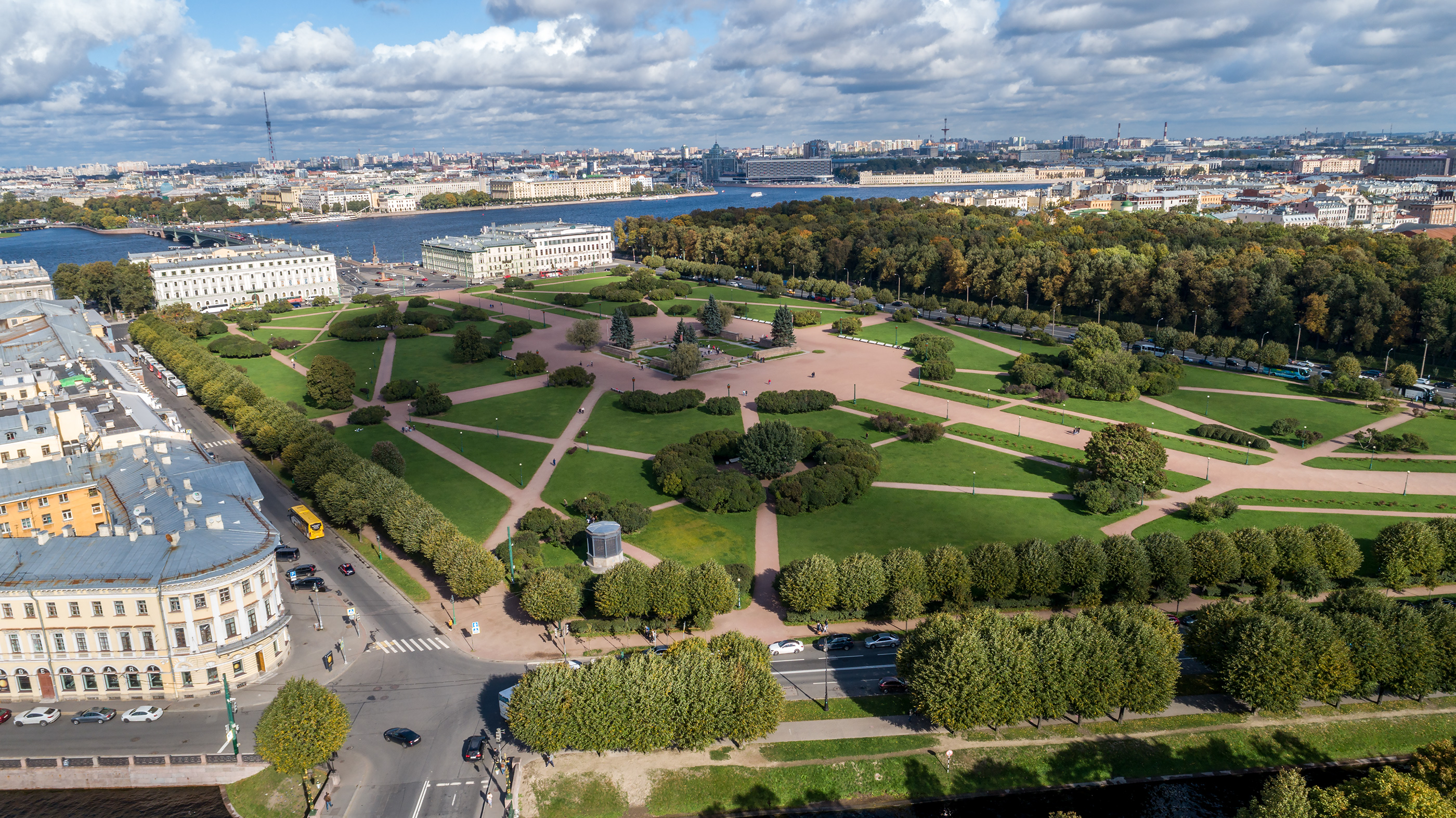
View across the Field of Mars, looking north. In the foreground is the course of the Moyka River, with the Neva in the distance

The square covers an area of nearly 9 hectares (22 acres). Bordering the Field of Mars to the north are the Marble Palace, Suvorov Square, the Betskoy and the Saltykov Mansions, separated from the square by Millionnaya Street. To the west are the former barracks of the Pavlovsky Regiment. The Moyka River forms the boundary to the south, across from which is the Mikhailovsky Palace and Garden. The east side is bounded by the Swan Canal, which separates the Field of Mars from the Summer Garden.

== Imperial period ==
=== Petrine park ===
In the early 18th century the land which eventually became the Field of Mars was a marshy area with trees and shrubs, lying between the Neva to the north, and the Mya (now the Moyka) and Krivusha (now the Griboyedov Canal) rivers to the south. With the establishment of the imperial residence in the Summer Garden in 1704, the area became a buffer zone separating the royal property from the rest of the city. Between 1711 and 1721 two canals, the Swan, and the Red, were dug to the east and west respectively with the purpose of draining the land. This created a roughly rectangular parcel of land, initially called simply Pustoi (Russian: Пустой), meaning "Empty" - after the trees that grew here were felled, and from the 1720s, the "Great Meadow" (Russian: Большой Луг).

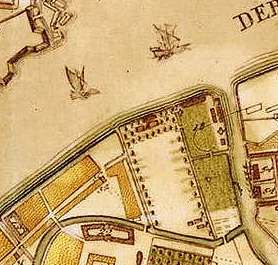
The site of the future Field of Mars, shown on a 1737 map of the city

A tavern was built in the northwestern part of the land in 1712, being rebuilt in 1714 as a post office. Between 1713 and 1717 the area hosted the royal menagerie, containing various birds and animals, including an elephant. With the construction of the Red Canal, the menagerie was transferred to Hamovaya Street (now Mokhovaya Street). With the completion of the Red Canal in 1721, the western edge of the Big Meadow became a popular site for the nobility to construct large townhouses. Those that settled in the area included Charles Frederick, Duke of Holstein-Gottorp, Alexander Rumyantsev, Adam Veyde, and Pavel Yaguzhinsky, and Peter the Great's daughter, Elizabeth Petrovna. With the canals dug to carry away water, the land was soon drained, and on the orders of Peter the Great, it was levelled, cleared and sown with grass, with alleys laid out for walking and riding. The Great Meadow became a location for military parades and festivals. Celebrations of the 1721 Treaty of Nystad were held here, with a triumphal arch built to commemorate the treaty. The area became known as "Amusement Field" (Russian: Потешное поле). The Gottorp Globe was initially installed on the field shortly after its arrival in Saint Petersburg, housed in the former elephant quarters. A special building was constructed for it, and opened to the public for a time, before the globe was moved to the Kunstkamera on Vasilyevsky Island in summer 1726.

=== Imperial meadow ===
During the reign of Empress Catherine I, the field was termed the "Meadow in front of the Summer Palace" (Russian: Луг перед Летним дворцом), and during the reigns of her successors Empress Anna and Empress Elizabeth, it became the site of their Summer Palaces, designed by Francesco Bartolomeo Rastrelli. Under Empress Anna, the land was used to host military exercises and parades for two weeks every autumn. After these parades the officers dined in the Summer Palace, while the soldiers ate on the meadow. In February 1740 Empress Anna ordered repairs and improvements to the square, including the planting of trees and the removal of some buildings. Architect Mikhail Zemtsov designed 24 garden pavilions, and oversaw the laying out of new paths and tree planting carried out by Harmen van Bol'es and his apprentice Ilya Surmin. A fountain decorated with dragons, dolphins, and mascarons by Konrad Osner was placed in the centre of the square. Further work took place in the early reign of Empress Elizabeth, with new walkways and tree planting. The square became known as the "Promenade" (Russian: Променад), and it continued to house attractions and kiosks on public holidays. It was still a popular location for the houses of the rich and powerful, with the former residence of the Duke of Holstein-Gottorp presented by Empress Elizabeth to her favourite, Alexei Razumovsky. Also with their houses here at this period were the court physician Jean Armand de Lestocq and the military commander Stepan Fyodorovich Apraksin.

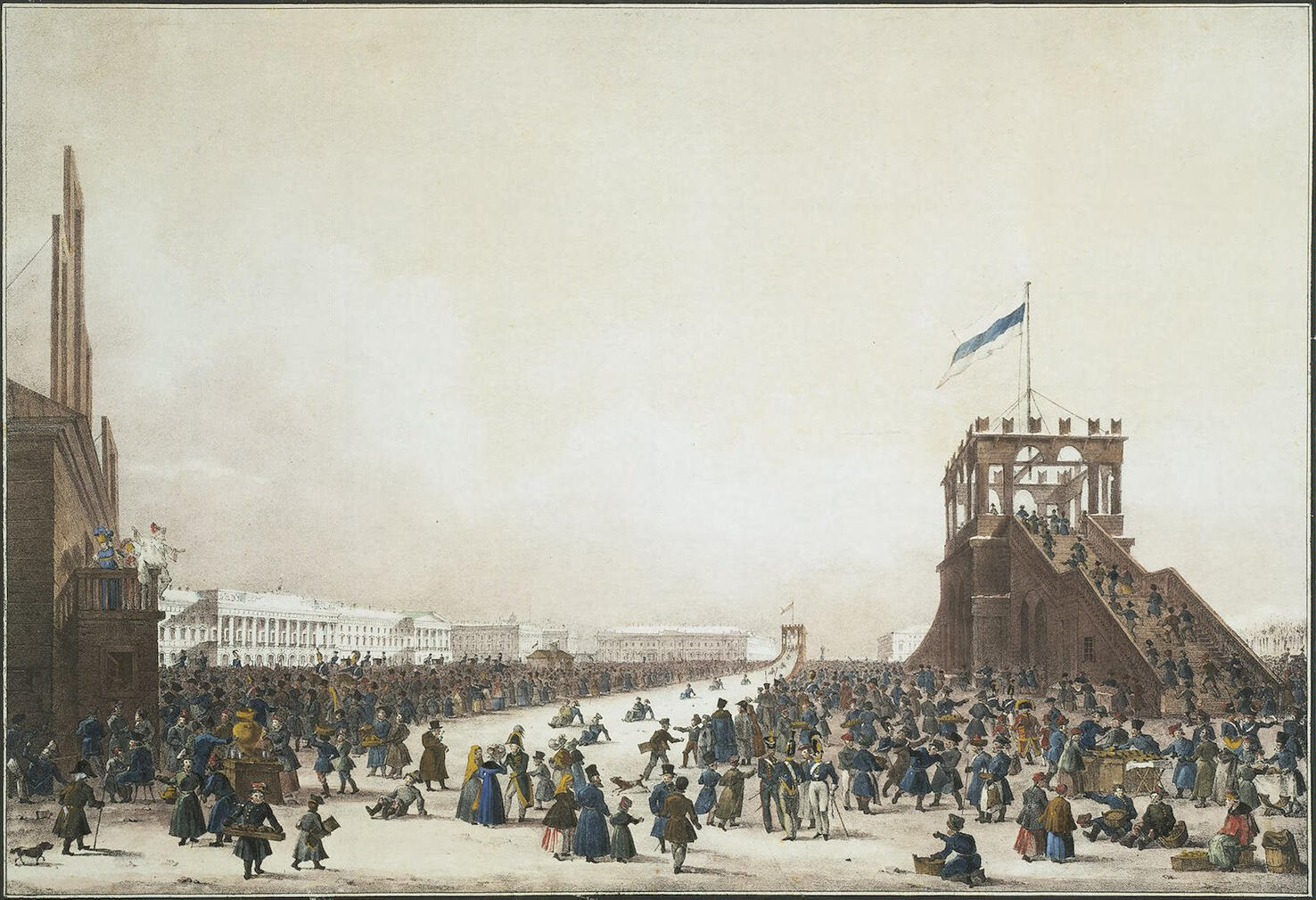
Ice slides and other attractions on the field in the 1820s

In 1750 a theatre, designed by Rastrelli, was built on the square, replacing an earlier one that had stood on the corner of the Catherine Canal and Nevsky Prospect but had burnt down in 1749. The new theatre was of wooden construction on a stone foundation, and had three tiers of boxes. It was built by 353 soldiers of the garrison regiments, and was completed on 25 April. It hosted its first performance, a comedic opera, on 3 May, becoming the first opera house in Russia. It eventually fell into disrepair and was demolished towards the end of the eighteenth century. From 1751 the area in front of the Summer Palace became known as the "Tsaritsyn Meadow". It also hosted the Maly Theatre on the banks of the Moyka, and was the venue of a German troupe led by Karl Knipper, which performed with the pupils of the city's Foundling Home. It was rebuilt in October 1781 by order of Catherine the Great, and continued to host performances. Ivan Dmitrevsky, an actor in the troupe, and later its director, arranged for it to present the first productions of comedic works by Denis Fonvizin, including The Brigadier and The Minor. The theatre also hosted performances of Catherine's own plays, and the first performance of Pierre Beaumarchais's The Barber of Seville in Russia. The Maly Theatre was eventually demolished in 1797 on the orders of the new emperor Paul I. The Theatrical Bridge, part of the Tripartite Bridge, is a reminder of the theatre's existence.

The city continued to expand during the second half of the eighteenth century and large townhouses and palaces were built along the northern boundary of the meadow, along the Neva embankment. The Marble Palace was the first, built between 1765 and 1785. Yury Felten designed the three-storey Lombard building to replace the Razumovsky residence on the west side of the meadow, at the junction with the prestigious Millionnaya Street. A severe flood in 1777 damaged or destroyed many of the features of the Promenade, after which military parades began to be held once more. This largely completed the destruction of the lawns and vegetation. The Red Canal was filled in during 1780, becoming a roadway, which was given the name Tsaritsynskaya Street in 1798. Expansion across the meadow's Neva frontage continued in the 1780s with the construction of the service wing of the Marble Palace, and the Betskoy and the Saltykov Mansions.

=== Military parade ground ===
In 1799 an obelisk designed by Vincenzo Brenna was installed in the centre of the field in honour of Pyotr Rumyantsev, and in 1801 Mikhail Kozlovsky's Suvorov Monument was unveiled on the south side of the field. During the brief reign of Paul I, the Tsaritsyn Meadow was used mainly for military parades and drill, with his son, Alexander I transferring the land from the city authorities to the military. On 16 May 1803 carousels, booths and other amusement pavilions were erected on the land as part of the celebrations of the centenary of the founding of Saint Petersburg. The martial nature of the area was reinforced with the renaming of the Tsaritsyn Meadow as the "Field of Mars" in 1805, commemorating Mars, the God of war in Roman mythology, whom Kozlovsky had depicted Alexander Suvorov as on his monument. The new name also referenced the Campus Martius in Rome and the Champ de Mars in Paris, drawing parallels and asserting that Saint Petersburg was also to be considered as a great European capital. The name "Tsaritsyn Meadow" however continued to appear on some maps up until 1917. Pushkin acknowledged the military connection in his 1833 poem The Bronze Horseman;

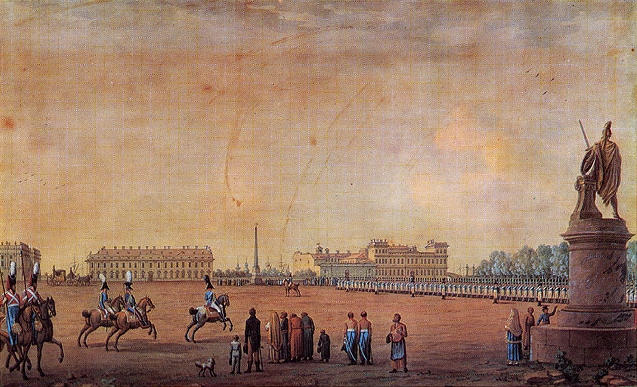
The Field of Mars in the early 19th century, by Benjamin Patersen.

I love the military vigour
Paraded on the Field of Mars:
Stout-hearted foot troops and hussars
In orderly and pleasing figure;
Torn battle colours held on high;
Smart ranks in measured rhythm swaying;
Glint of brass helmets, all displaying
Proud bullet scars from wars gone by.

Military use trampled the remaining grassy surface to dust, which when raised by the soldiers' boots, blew across the city, often settling in the trees of the nearby Summer Garden, and earning the Field of Mars its nickname of the "Saint Petersburg Sahara".

The next major redevelopment of the area was in 1818, with architect Carlo Rossi including it in the development of his architectural ensemble to the south, centred around the Mikhailovsky Palace estate. The Rumyantsev Obelisk was removed to Vasilyevsky Island while the monument to Suvorov was relocated to a new square, later named Suvorov Square, north of the Field of Mars on the Neva embankment, and between the Marble Palace and the Saltykov Mansion. Between 1817 and 1821 a large building alongside the west of the square was built to the design of Vasily Stasov to house the Barracks of the Pavlovsky Regiment, with the western ensemble completed with houses between the Moyka and the south of the Pavlovsky Regiment building. In 1823, as part of the redevelopment of the land around the Field of Mars and the Mikhailovsky Palace, Sadovaya Street was extended up to the eastern edge of the Field of Mars, joining the pathway running parallel to the Swan Canal, and connecting with Millionaya Street which crossed the northern boundary.

The Parade Celebrating the End of Military Action in the Kingdom of Poland on Tsaritsa Meadow in St Petersburg on 6 October 1831, by Grigory Chernetsov

From the 1820s the Field of Mars became the main site for military parades in Saint Petersburg. Reviews of the Guard Corps were held every May, prior to the Imperial family's departure for its summer residences, along with parades to mark important events. On 23 September 1829 a prayer service was held after the Russo-Turkish War, and a parade in 1831 celebrated the end of hostilities with Poland following the November Uprising. This parade was depicted in a painting by Grigory Chernetsov, now held in the collections of the Russian Museum. Another review was held on the field on 21 April 1856, marking the ceremonial disbanding of regiments of the national militia that had been raised for service in the Crimean War. Georgiana Bloomfield, wife of the British ambassador John Bloomfield, described the May 1846 review on the field:

I saw a wonderful sight: Emperor Nicholas displayed 40 thousand troops on the Field of Mars. The day was beautiful and clear, and I had a great place by the window in the palace of the Prince of Oldenburg. At one o'clock all the troops lined up and the emperor with his retinue, which included all the military diplomatic corps, including my husband, rode up to the ranks, the troops shouted "Hurray!" and the sound of such a multitude of voices shook the air. The Sovereign then approached the Summer Garden and all the troops defiled before him: first the light artillery, then the infantry, behind them cavalry, accompanied by heavy artillery ...

The May military parades ceased during the reign of Alexander III but resumed under his son Nicholas II.

=== Festival grounds ===
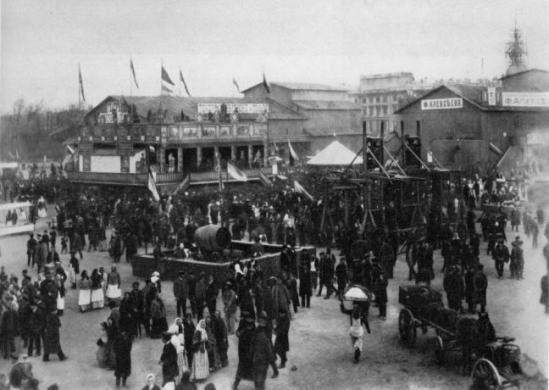
Theatres, attractions and stands on the Field of Mars in the 1890s

From 1869 folk festivals once more began to be held on the Field of Mars, marking such events as Maslenitsa, Easter, the Emperor's name day, the coronations of new emperors, and on 30 August, the feast day of the city's patron saint, Alexander Nevsky. Booths, carousels and other entertainments were erected on the field. The newspaper Vsemirnaya Illyustratsiya described the 1869 fair:

People's holidays, as they are now arranged on the Tsaritsa Meadow, have recently been instituted here. The chief of police, adjutant general F. F. Trepov, is responsible for this noble business. Tents, carousels, swings are built, poles are erected, a folk theatre, or rather a stage for it, is set up. The spectators are placed standing in the open air. Barrels are sent from breweries. A German sausage maker stands nearby and offers hot sausages at bargain prices. Theatre lovers are crowded in front of the stage for a long time and await the performance of "Filatka and Miroshka". The farce is played briskly...

The artist Mstislav Dobuzhinsky recalled visiting a fair on the field when a child:

Approaching the Field of Mars, where the booths stood, already from the Chain Bridge and even earlier, from Panteleimonovskaya, I heard the shaking of the human rumble and a whole sea of sounds - horns, and the squeak of whistles, and the mournful sound of the street-organ, the accordion, and the banging of tambourines, and individual cries — all this drew me on, and with all my strength I hurried my nanny to get there as quickly as possible. The booths could already be seen behind the bare trees of the Summer Garden - these tall yellow plank stands stretched in two rows along the entire Field of Mars, and on all of them tricolour flags flew, and behind the booths there were spinning swings and ice mountains, also with flags at the top.

Sports and exercises taking place on the Field of Mars in the pre-revolutionary period

Prior to 1872 Admiralteyskaya Square had also been used as a venue for festivals, but the laying out of the Alexander Garden meant that there was no space for the booths, and the Field of Mars became the sole venue in the city. As well as entertainments, sports competitions were also held, with activities such as climbing a greasy pole, and walking on a spinning log. In 1867, concerned about the high levels of drunkenness in the city, authorities placed restrictions on the sale of alcohol during public holidays. In August 1867 some 100,000 people gathered on the Field of Mars, without a single arrest for drunkness. In 1892 a 12-year-old received a set of china for winning the spinning log competition. Festivals were held on the occasions of the parades of the Preobrazhensky and Semyonovsky Regiments from 1897, until 1907 when festivals on the Field of Mars were banned. It was around this time that a tower was built on the field to house a telescope. A proposal was made to construct a bicycle track on the Field of Mars, but it ultimately failed to gain sufficient funding. Sporting events continued to be held on the field during the early twentieth century. It hosted the world championship in speed skating in winter 1903, and in 1913 the first inter-city hockey match was held here. The Saint Petersburg team "Sport" were beaten 2:6 by an English club. A reinforced concrete skating rink was built that year to a design by Yevgeny-Karl Schröter, though the entrance fee was comparatively expensive at 55 kopecks in the afternoon, 1 ruble 10 kopecks in the evening. The building was considered to detract from the existing architectural ensemble, and was dismantled shortly afterwards.

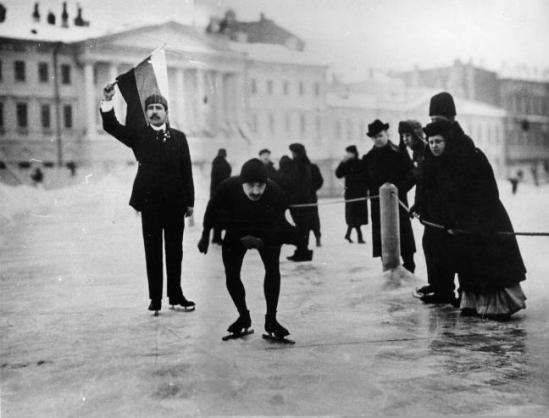
Skating on the Field of Mars in 1914

Another attraction appeared in the winter of 1910–1911 with reindeer brought onto the field and offered to citizens for riding. Vyacheslav Popov, a wealthy Komi, had lost most of his herd to disease. He brought the remaining animals to Saint Petersburg, quartering them on the Field of Mars, and offering them for public rides for five kopecks per lap. As a result, he made some money, and was also granted an audience with Nicholas II. Various proposals were made to develop the Field of Mars during the early twentieth century. One proposal in 1906 was for the creation of a building, designed by architect Marian Lalewicz, to house the State Duma. Another was for an opera house using designs by Victor Schröter, and a 1909 project suggested the creation of a park or garden with a monument to Emperor Alexander II designed by I. S. Kitner. Other failed proposals included that in 1913 to return the Rumyantsev Obelisk to the Field of Mars, and the creation of a shopping centre with a hotel, a restaurant and a post office. Despite these rejections, several projects did come to fruition. In 1909, Franz Roubaud's panoramic painting "The Defence of Sevastopol" was displayed on the Field of Mars in a special pavilion designed by Vasily Shene. A telescope was installed on the field to allow citizens to observe the solar eclipse on 17 April 1912. Also prior to the outbreak of the First World War the Urania Observatory and a summer cinema, named "American Mountains", were located on the field. During the war the field was used to store stacks of firewood.

== Revolutionary and Soviet period ==
=== Revolutionary burials ===
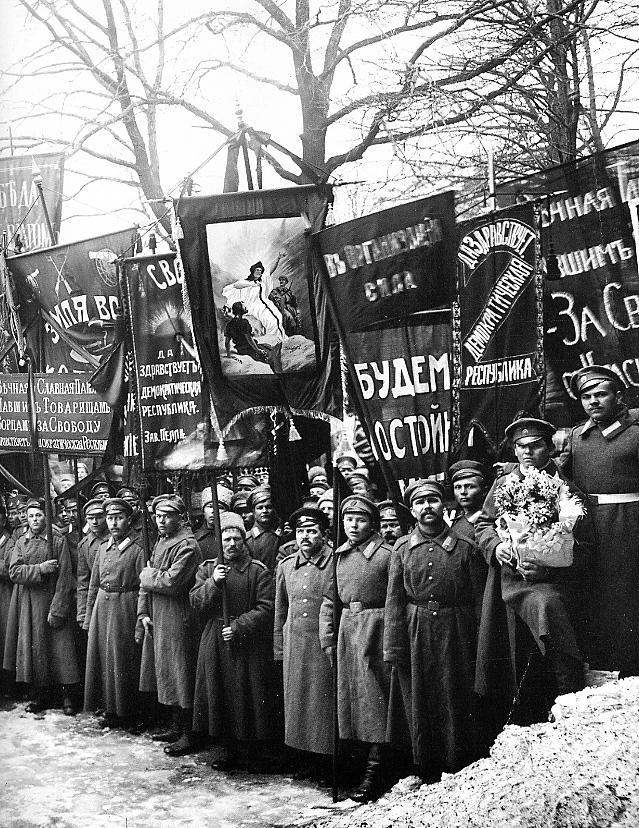
The funerals of those killed during the February Revolution on 5 April [O.S. 23 March] 1917

,

After the February Revolution, the Petrograd Soviet decided to create an honorary communal burial ground for those who had been killed in the unrest, and the Field of Mars was selected. An important consideration was the plan to site the putative Constituent Assembly on the Field of Mars, which would then overlook a monument to those who had died in the revolution. Four large graves were dug in the centre of the Field of Mars.

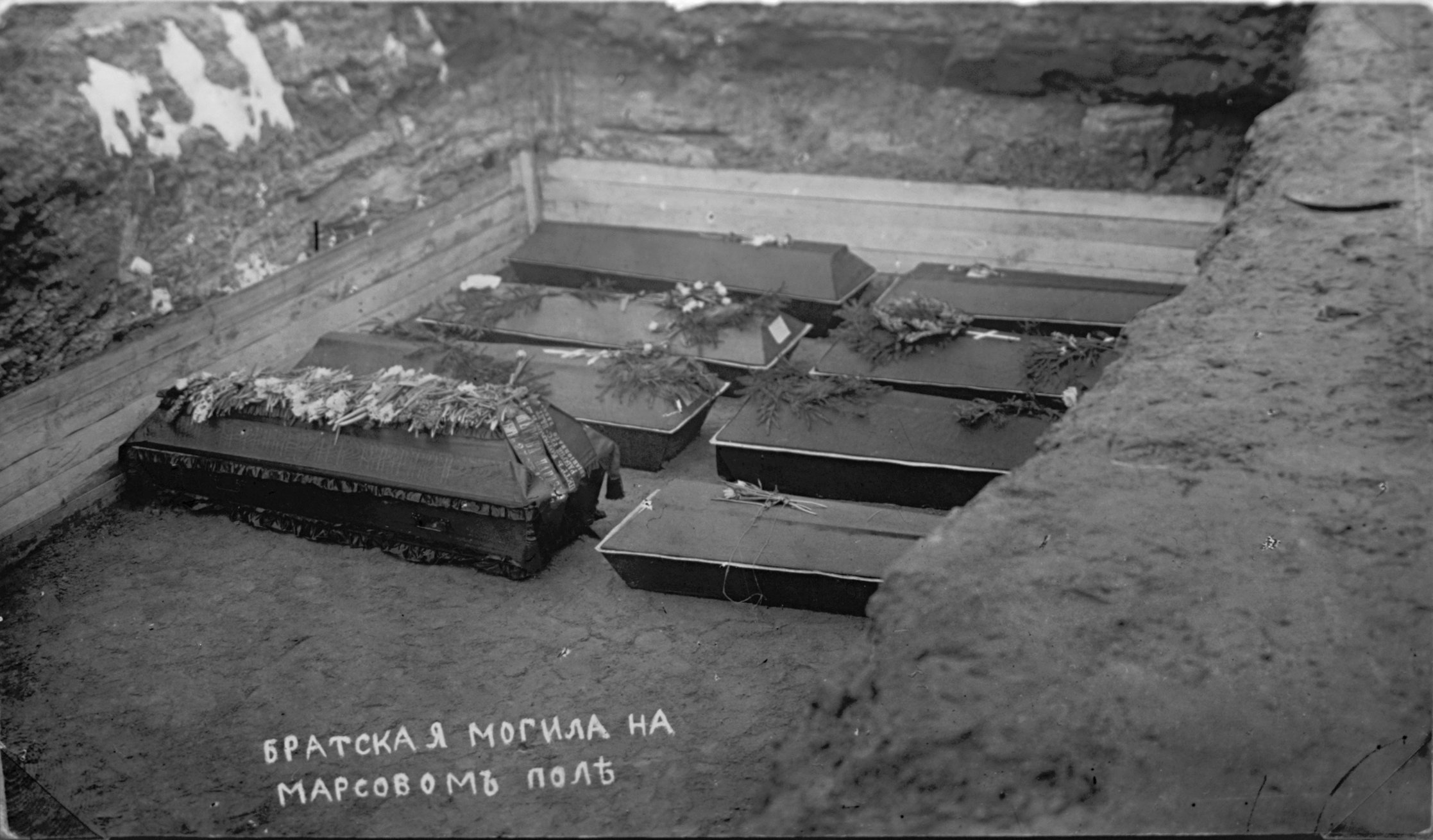
Coffins in the communal grave

The burials were scheduled to take place on 5 April [O.S. 23 March] 1917, but prior to this news circulated that there would not be any funeral rites. Relatives of the dead hurried to claim and bury them in other cemeteries with the traditional rites. Ultimately only 184 victims were buried on the Field of Mars, comprising 86 soldiers, 9 sailors, 2 officers, 32 workers, 6 women, 23 people for whom social status could not be determined, and 26 unknown dead. The city soviet declared 5 April a day off work, and many citizens turned out to accompany the funeral processions, which carried the dead from the hospitals and chapels across the city. The graves had been prepared by blasting trenches in the frozen ground, with the lowering of each coffin marked by a cannon shot from the Peter and Paul Fortress. By one estimate some 800,000 people attended the funerals. A competition for the design of the memorial was won by Lev Rudnev and the Monument to the Fighters of the Revolution was opened on 7 November 1919. Epitaphs by Anatoly Lunacharsky, People's Commissar of Education, were inscribed around the memorial.

=== Soviet pantheon ===
The burials of the dead of the February Revolution started a trend for the Field of Mars to become a pantheon of those who died in the service of the revolution and the achievement of Soviet power. The first individual burial, that of V. Volodarsky, took place on 23 June 1918. Volodarsky, a member of the Presidium of the All-Russian Central Executive Committee, had been assassinated three days earlier. Further burials took place later that year, when a number of the dead of the October Revolution were interred. Other interments over the following years included Moisei Uritsky, chairman of the Petrograd Cheka who was assassinated in August 1918; Semyon Nakhimson, who was killed in the Yaroslavl Uprising in July 1918; Civil War commander A. S. Rakov in 1919 and All-Russian Central Executive Committee member Semyon Voskov in 1920. The Field of Mars continued to be used as a military parade and training ground during this period, hosting a review of the first "red officers" on 18 September 1918. On the first anniversary of the October Revolution the Field of Mars was renamed the "Victims of the Revolution Square", and was sometimes called "The Square of the Graves of the Victims of the Revolution."

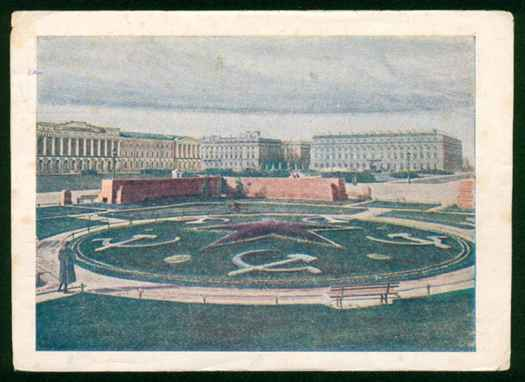
A monument to Soviet sacrifices, the Field of Mars between the wars

The layout of the square was further developed following the installation of the monument, with gardens and pathways to the design of Ivan Fomin. The first Subbotnik, a Saturday devoted to volunteer work, was held on 1 May 1920, with 16,000 city inhabitants working to plant more than 60,000 bushes and trees on the square, laying paths and alleys, and removing waste. On 19 July 1920 the Field of Mars was visited by delegates of the 2nd World Congress of the Comintern, led by Vladimir Lenin. The redesign was completed in 1921, and on 25 October the square was transferred to the city's Garden and Park Administration. In 1922 the Comintern and the All-Russian Central Executive Committee proposed creating a monument to the October Revolution, but the project was never carried out. The last burial on the square, that of the secretary of the Leningrad city committee of the CPSU Ivan Gaza, took place on 8 October 1933.

=== Wartime use and postwar memorial ===
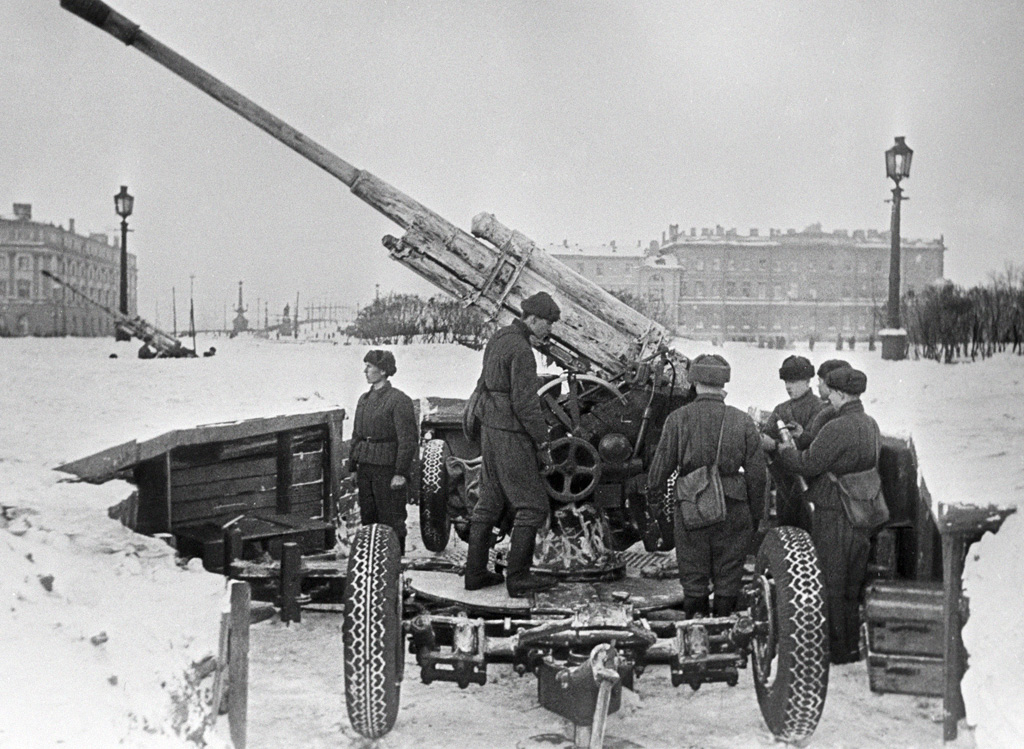
Anti-aircraft guns on the Field of Mars in March 1942

The square was laid out with vegetable gardens during summer 1942 to help feed the city during the siege of Leningrad. There were also six anti-aircraft batteries located on the field, as well as trenches to provide shelter from bombardments. The square's former name, the Field of Mars, was restored on 13 January 1944. It underwent further reconstruction between 1947 and 1955, with an eternal flame lit in the centre of the square on 6 November 1957, in memory of the victims of various wars and revolutions. The flame, lit from the open-hearth furnace of the Kirov Factory, was the first eternal flame in Russia. The flame from the Field of Mars was also used to light the eternal flame at the Piskaryovskoye Memorial Cemetery on 9 May 1960, and at other memorials in Saint Petersburg. The flame was delivered to Moscow in 1967 and on 8 May lit the eternal flame on the Tomb of the Unknown Soldier near the Kremlin Wall.

== Post-Soviet period ==
The square was once more reconstructed between 1998 and 2001. Over 3,800 new bushes and trees were planted, and the paths and lawns were repaired. The Monument to the Fighters of the Revolution was also restored, being relit on 14 November 2003 with a flame once again taken from the Kirov Factory's furnace. By the early 2000s, with parking and transport around the city becoming problematic, proposals have occasionally been made to build a car park under the Field of Mars. The presence of graves has led residents to oppose these plans. In 2014 the memorial was restored by experts from the State Museum of Urban Sculpture.

=== Public meeting place ===
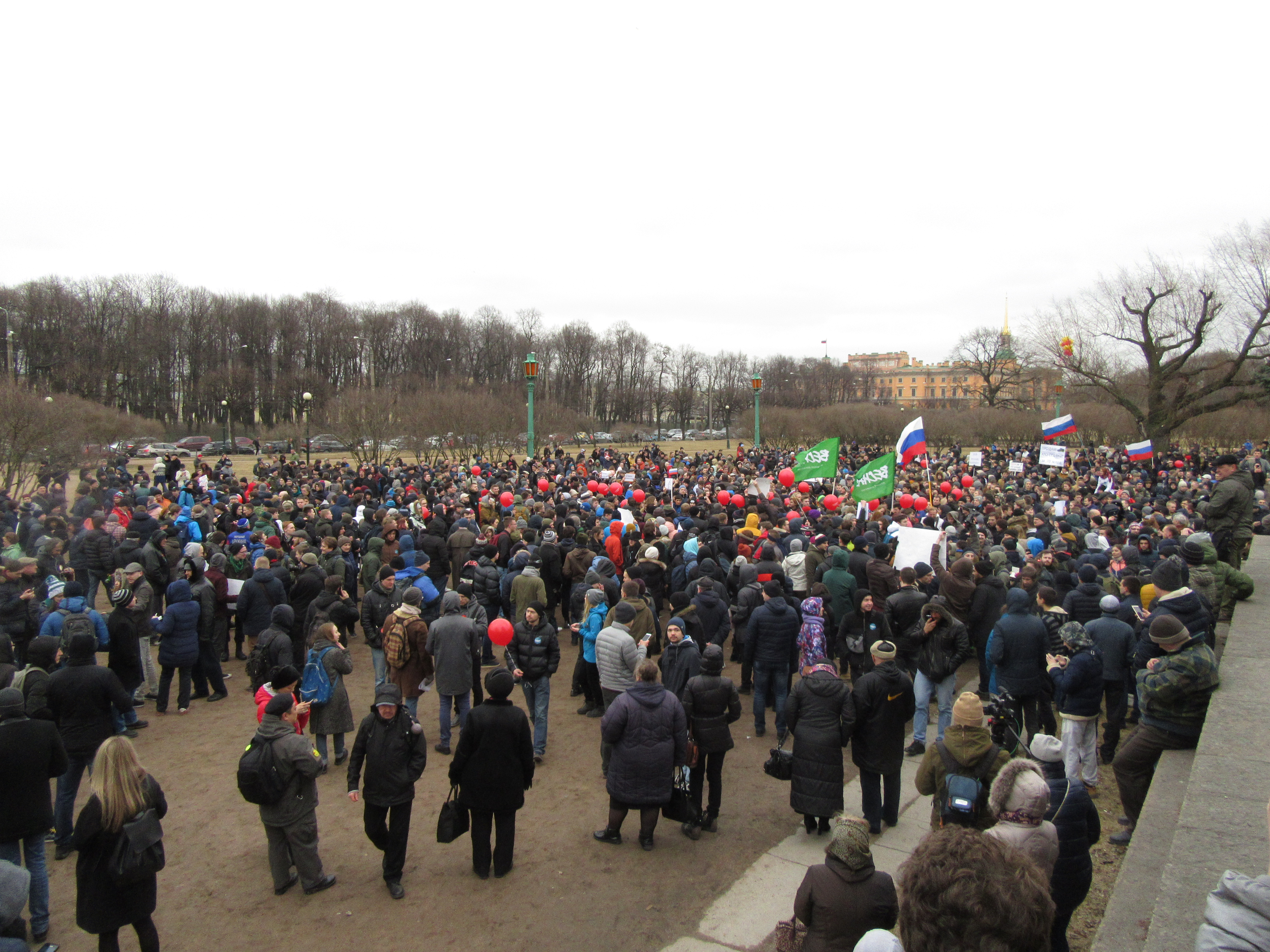
An anti-corruption demonstration on the Field of Mars on 26 March 2017

By the mid-2000s, the Field of Mars had become a popular location for demonstrations and protests on issues such as political prisoners, fair elections, anti-corruption measures, etc. This status was acknowledged in December 2012 when the square was designated a "Hyde Park" by the Governor of Saint Petersburg Georgy Poltavchenko, making it a "specially designated place in the city for the collective discussion of socially significant issues and the expression of citizens' public sentiments." A particularly large rally was held on 12 June 2017, attended by over ten thousand people. Police detained 658 people, including Maxim Reznik, a deputy of the Legislative Assembly of Saint Petersburg, and several journalists. In August 2017 Poltavchenko revoked the "Hyde Park" status of the Field of Mars, citing the nature of the burials and memorial made it an inappropriate location for rallies.

== See also ==
- List of squares in Saint Petersburg
