= Summer Palace (Rastrelli) =

Russian imperial palace

Coordinates: 59°56′26.5″N 30°20′15.5″E

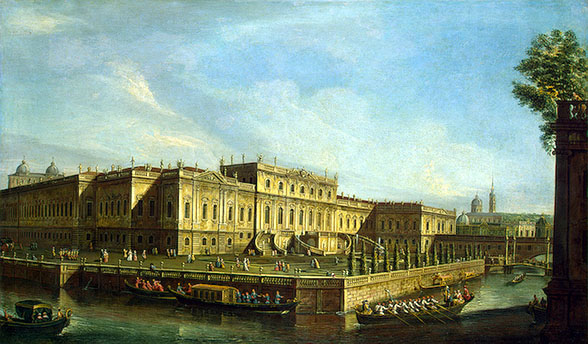
Painting of the Summer Palace of Elizaveta Petrovna in 1756.

The Summer Palace (Russian: Ле́тний дворе́ц) is either of the two wooden Baroque palaces built by Francesco Bartolomeo Rastrelli on Tsaritsa's Meadow behind the Summer Garden in St. Petersburg. Neither building survives.

== First Palace ==
It was in 1730 that Rastrelli designed the first wooden palace for Empress Anna. This was a one-storied structure, with 28 rooms, a spacious central hall, and a system of interior waterways.

After Elizaveta Petrovna ascended the Russian throne in 1741, she commissioned Rastrelli to demolish the palace of her predecessor and build a "Venetian-style" residence for herself.

== Second Palace ==
The new Summer Palace, completed in 1744, was the chief residence of Empress Elizabeth in the Russian capital. It was a large and imposing mauve-walled edifice with 160 gilded rooms, adjacent church and a fountain cascade. A Hermitage pavilion and an opera house were added to the compound in the 1750s.

In 1762, Catherine the Great moved her court to the newly built Winter Palace, effectively sealing the fate of the older residence. A year after her death in 1796, Emperor Paul (who had been born there in 1754) ordered the dilapidated palace to be demolished and replaced it with a new residence, St. Michael's Castle.
