= Hermitage Bridge =

Bridge in Saint Petersburg, Russia

Hermitage Bridge Russian: Эрмитажный мост
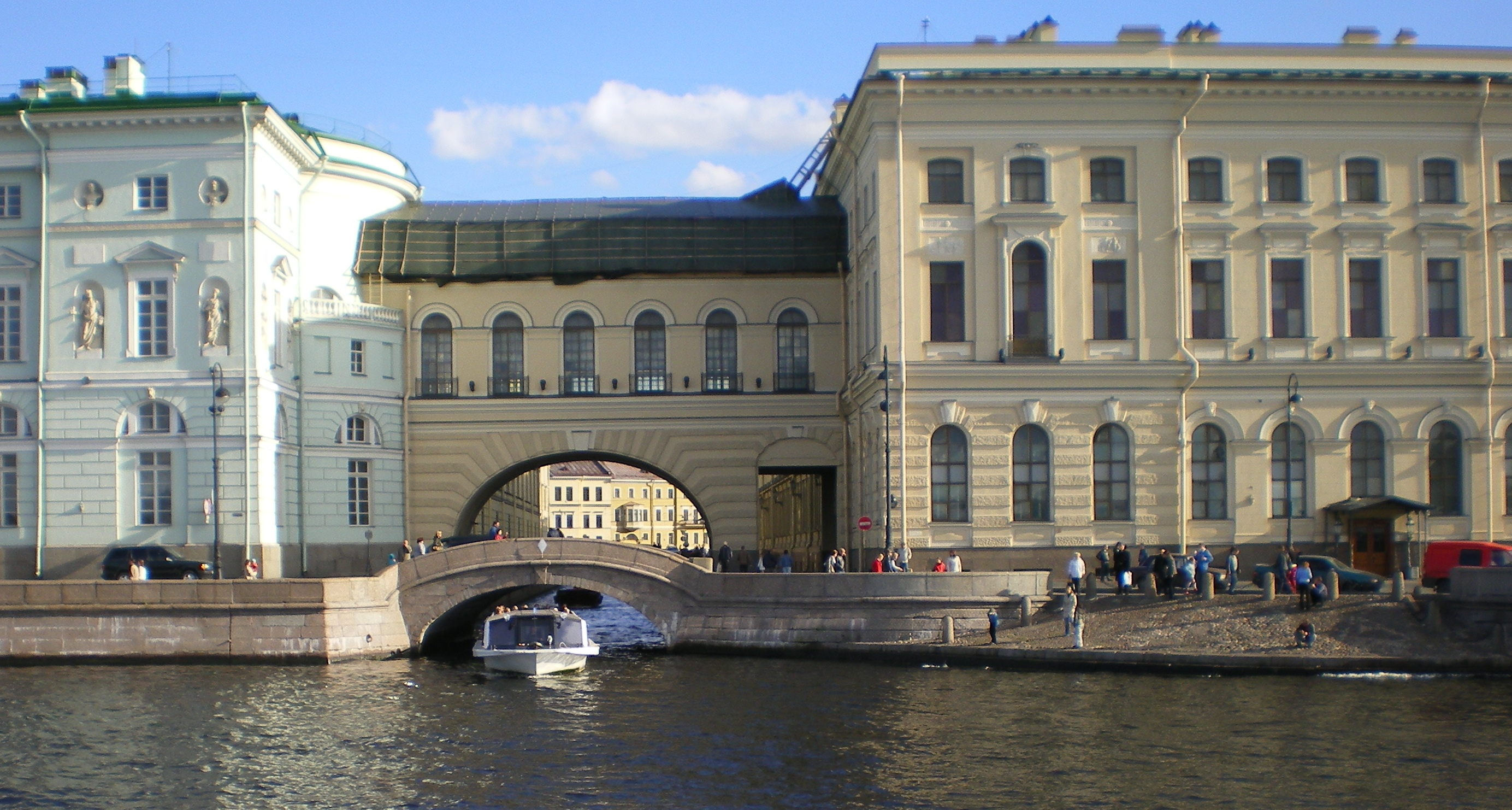
- Bridge view from Neva river
- Coordinates: 59.94268°N 30.31683°E
- Carries: traffic and pedestrian
- Crosses: Winter Canal
- Locale: Saint Petersburg

Characteristics
- Design: Arch Bridge
- Total length: 22.1 m
- Width: 15.2 m

History
- Opened: 1720 (wooden), 1766

The Hermitage Bridge (Russian: Эрмита́жный мост) is a bridge across the Winter Canal along Palace Embankment in Saint Petersburg, Russia. The bridge constitutes part of the Hermitage and Winter Palace ensemble.

== Location ==
The bridge is between the Hermitage Theatre (32, Palace Embankment) and the Old Hermitage (34, Palace Embankment). The Winter Canal separates two islands: Winter Palace is on Second Admiralty island (in the west), while the Hermitage Theatre is on First Admiralty island (in the east). Automobile traffic crosses the bridge in two lanes, one in each direction. The canal waters flow from the Neva to the Moyka, while boats on the canal travel from the Moyka to the Neva.

The nearest station of the Saint Petersburg Metro is Admiralteyskaya.

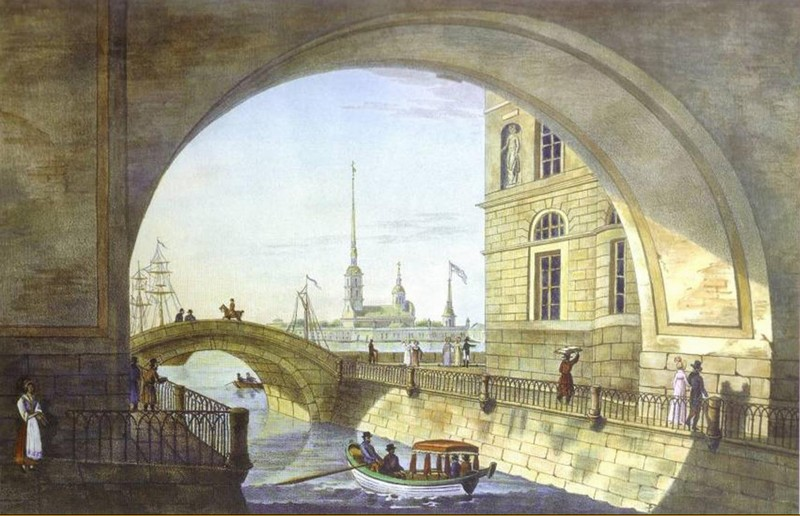
View on Hermitage Bridge towards Neva River. 1820 lithograph

== History ==
The original bridge was a three-span wooden drawbridge constructed in 1718–20 by Harmen van Bol'es, immediately after the canal near the Winter Palace was completed. This bridge was narrow, allowing passage of only one cart at a time.

The permanent stone bridge was built in 1763–66, in conjunction with building of granite embankments of the Neva River. Today, Hermitage Bridge remains the oldest stone bridge in Saint Petersburg.

Originally the arch of the bridge was built from brick and limestone with granite exterior. In 1934 it was replaced with the new monolithic hinge-free ferroconcrete arch, but the granite facade was preserved by the project of engineer A. D. Sapestein and architect K. M. Dmitriev, the adviser – professor G. P. Peredery. In 1950, the original decor of ramps was restored.

== Name ==
On 20 April 1738, the bridge received its first official name of Upper Embankment Bridge (Russian: Верхний Набережный мост) after the Upper Embankment street (today's Palace Embankment). However, this name didn't catch on. The name Winter Palace Bridge (Russian: Зимнедворцовый мост) after the nearby Winter Palace started to circulate in the middle of the 18th century. From the end of the 18th century the bridge was renamed to Palace Bridge (not to be confused with the modern Palace Bridge). The current name was established in 1929. The Hermitage Bridge name came from the Hermitage Theater which was built by that time between Winter Canal and Winter Palace.
