= Tripartite Bridge =

Bridge in Saint Petersburg, Russia

Coordinates: 59.9417°N 30.3288°E

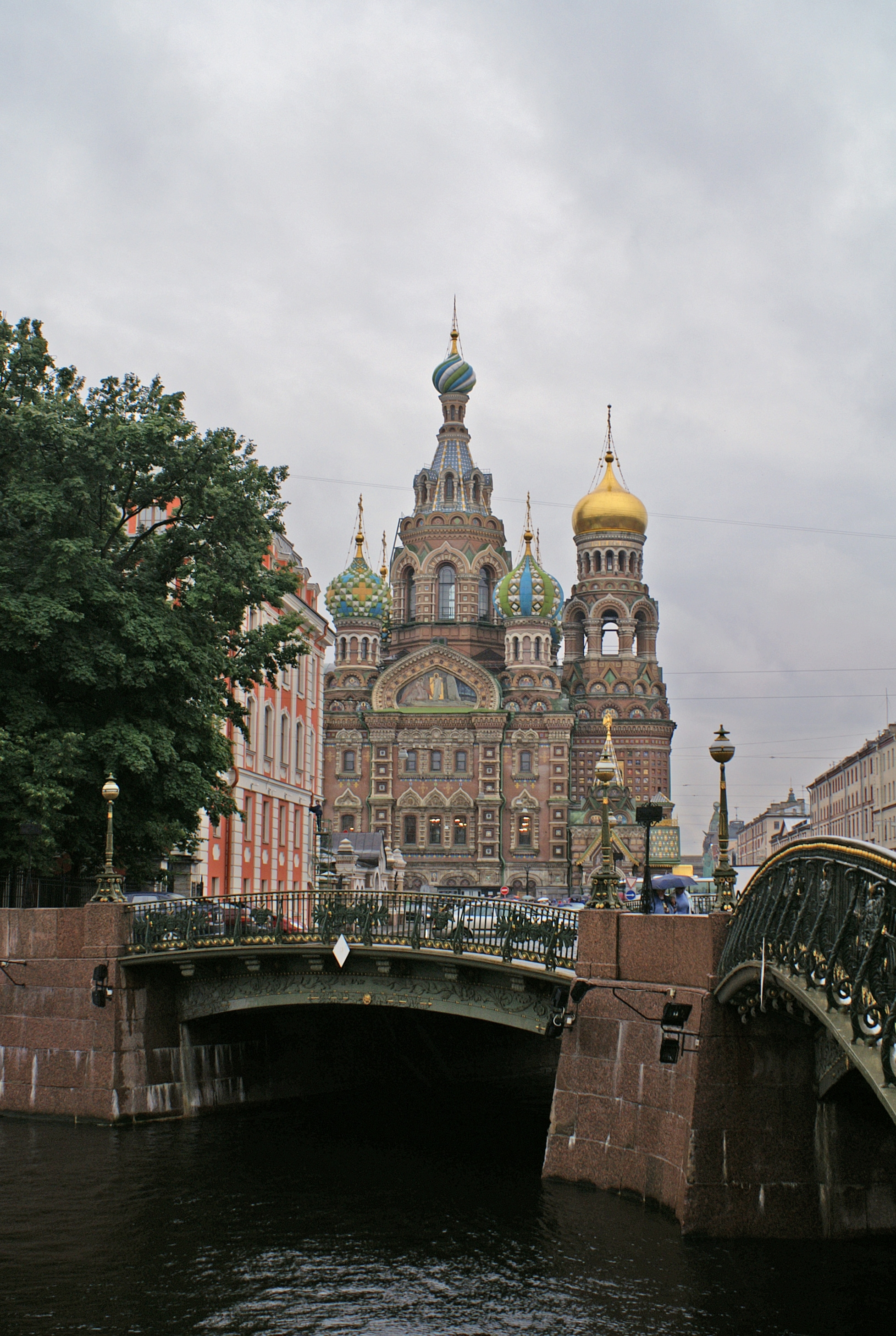
Tripartite Bridge is a convenient spot to take a photograph of the Saviour on Blood.

Tripartite Bridge or Three-Arched Bridge is the name commonly applied by St Petersburgers to a pair of diminutive bridges, similar in design and decoration and situated perpendicularly to each other in front of the Church of the Savior on Blood.

The ensemble consists of 15-meter-long Theatre Bridge across the Griboyedov Canal and 18-metre-long Malo-Konyushennyi Bridge across the Moika River - both resting on a single Moika pier. Lipkin Bridge is also sometimes included in this group.

The bridges were first constructed in wood during the reign of Empress Anne. A century later, architect Carlo Rossi conceived to unify the structures facing the Mikhailovsky Palace into a uniform Neoclassical ensemble. His plans were realized between 1829 and 1831 when the bridges were rebuilt and decorated with identical lamp posts and ironwork fences featuring palmettes, spears, and gorgons.

Thanks to repairs undertaken in 1936, 1953 and 1999, the bridge remains in good condition, and is still open to road and foot traffic.
