= Millionnaya Street =

Street in Saint Petersburg, Russia

Coordinates: 59.94339°N 30.32351°E

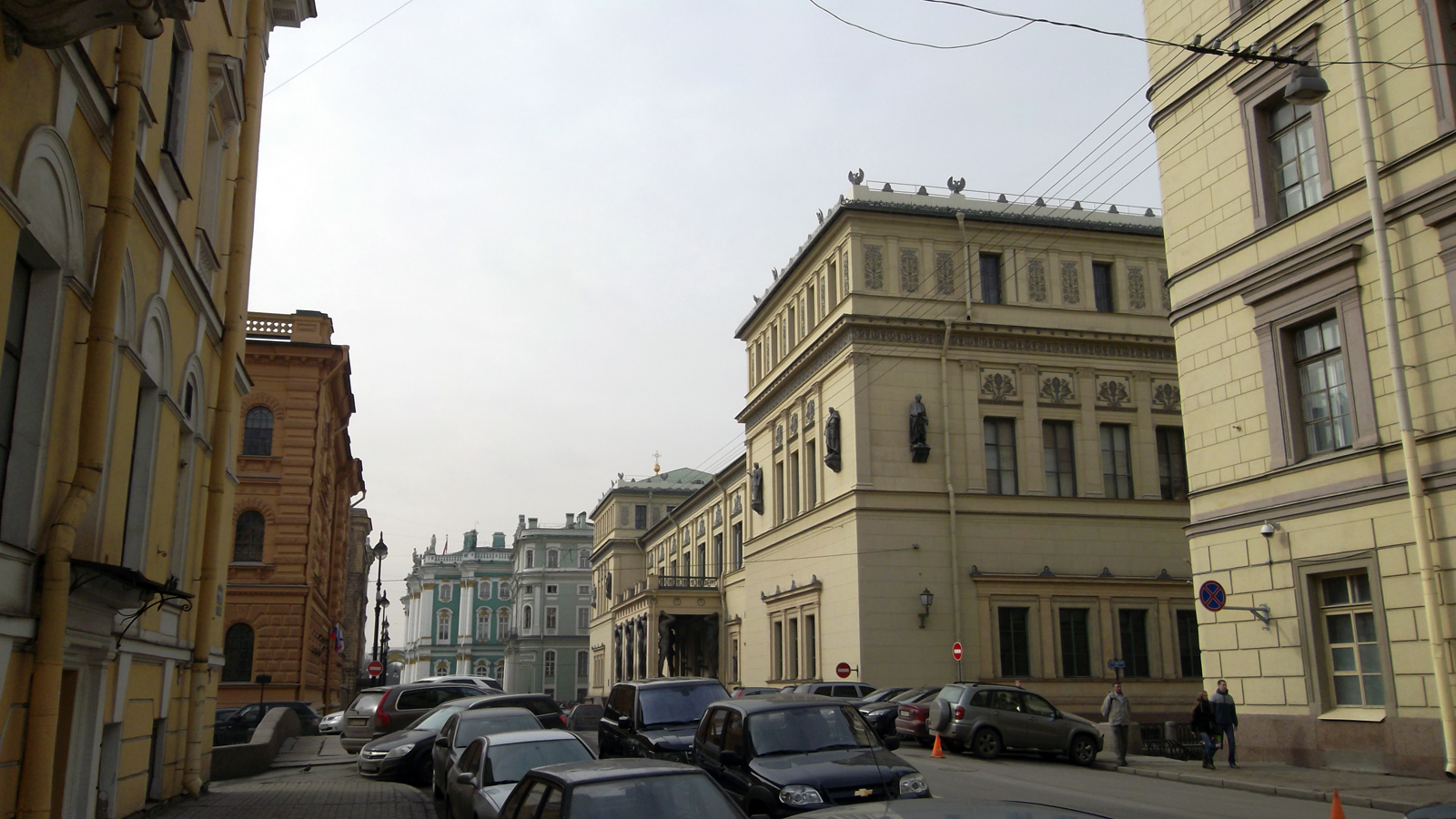
The Hermitage Museum and building of the New Hermitage by Leo von Klenze

Millionnaya Street (Russian: Миллионная улица, English: Millionaire Street) is a street on the left bank of the Neva in the Central District of St. Petersburg in Russia, runs - parallel to the Palace Quay - from the Swan Canal to the Palace Square. Significant buildings on Millionnaya Street include the New Hermitage Museum, the Chief Pharmacy, the Marble Palace, and the New Michael Palace. The street neighbors another roadway, Moshkov Lane.

== History ==
In the first half of the 18th century, the area of the current Millionnaya Street was the "German Settlement", the area in St. Petersburg where foreigners lived. Close to the Field of Mars and the current marketplace area was a Greek suburb. Several streets that ran near or on the route of the current Millionnaya Street existed under various names at various times: German Street, Great German Street, Greek Street, Great Street, Holy Trinity Street, Nobility Street, and Meadow Street, the last referring to the high meadow which later became the Field of Mars.

The last and most well-established name was Millionnaya Street (Millionaire Street), the name generally being ascribed to the wealth of the built-up streets in the area and the proximity of the royal residence, the Winter Palace.

In Soviet times the street was named Khalturina Street, in honor of the Narodnik revolutionary Stepan Khalturin, who detonated a bomb in the Winter Palace in 1880 that caused 67 casualties (but failed to kill the Czar).
