= Institute of Oriental Manuscripts of the Russian Academy of Sciences =

Russian research institute

Coordinates: 59.944°N 30.322°E

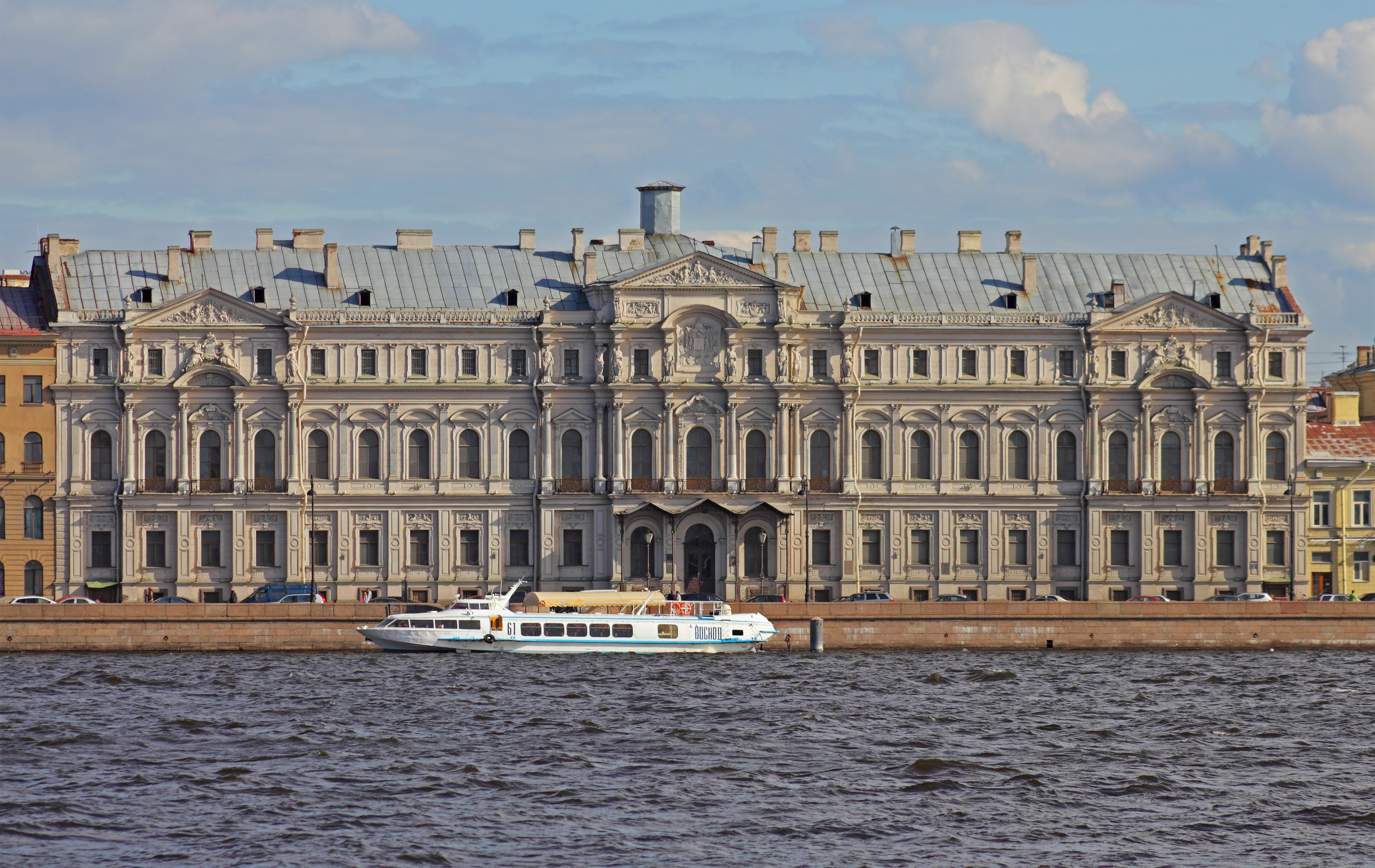
The Novo-Mikhailovsky Palace on Palace Quay, the home to the Institute of Oriental Manuscripts

The Institute of Oriental Manuscripts (IOM) of the Russian Academy of Sciences (RAS; Russian: Институт восточных рукописей Российской академии наук), formerly the St. Petersburg Branch of the Institute of Oriental Studies of the Russian Academy of Sciences, is a research institute in Saint Petersburg, Russia that houses various collections of manuscripts and early printed material in Asian languages, including Arabic, Chinese, Mongolian, Tibetan, and Tangut.

== History ==
The origins of the IOM date back to 1818, when the Russian Academy of Sciences learned that Louis-Jacques Rousseau (1780–1831), the French consul at Aleppo and Tripoli (then both part of the Ottoman Empire), was selling his extensive collection of manuscripts written in the Arabic script. In November of that year, the president of the RAS, Count Sergey Uvarov, wrote to the Board of the RAS requesting that a separate room be put aside in the academy's cabinet of curiosities for storing this collection of manuscripts (which was eventually purchased by the RAS in two tranches, in 1819 and 1825), as well as other medals, manuscripts and books of oriental origin already in the Museum of the Imperial Academy of Science. The result was the establishment of the Asiatic Museum (Russian: Азиатский музей) of the RAS, in Saint Petersburg.

The Asiatic Museum quickly established itself as the main institute for the collection and study of oriental manuscripts and books in Russia, as well as a major international centre for oriental studies, and by the time of the Russian Revolution in 1917, almost a hundred years after its foundation, it housed one of the most extensive collections of oriental manuscripts and printed books in the world. Following the Russian Revolution, the Asiatic Museum continued under the same name until May 1930, when the Institute of Oriental Studies (IOS) of the Academy of Sciences of the USSR was founded, and the Asiatic Museum was incorporated into this new institute. The IOS was originally located within the Library of the Russian Academy of Sciences in Leningrad (the name for Saint Petersburg during the Soviet era), but in 1949 it moved to its own premises in one wing of the New Michael Palace (the other wing was occupied by the Institute for the History of Material Culture). Then two years later, in 1951, the institute was relocated to its own premises in Moscow. However, for practical reasons the institute's main library and its collections of manuscripts and early printed books remained at the New Michael Palace in Leningrad as the Department of Oriental Manuscripts of the IOS.

Five years after the move of the IOS to Moscow, in February 1956, the Department of Oriental Manuscripts in Leningrad was reconstituted as the Leningrad Branch of the IOS. Whereas the main Moscow branch of the IOS concentrated on modern studies, the Leningrad branch specialized in the study of ancient and medieval oriental history, literature and languages, as well as in the production of critical editions of texts in its collections.

After the dissolution of the Soviet Union in 1991, it continued as a branch of the IOS, albeit now renamed the Saint Petersburg Branch of the Institute of Oriental Studies of the Russian Academy of Sciences, until 2007. In 2007 the Saint Petersburg branch separated from the IOS to become an independent institute under the RAS. The new institute, which assumed the title of Institute of Oriental Manuscripts in late 2009, continues to occupy one wing of the New Michael Palace.

== List of directors ==
=== Directors of the Asiatic Museum (1818–1930) ===
- Christian Martin Frähn (1818–1842)
- Johannes Albrecht Bernhard Dorn (1842–1881)
- Victor Romanovich Rosen (1881–1882)
- Ferdinand Johann Wiedemann (1882–1885)
- Friedrich Wilhelm Radloff (1885–1890)
- Karl Germanovich Salemann (1890–1916)
- Sergey Fyodorovich Oldenburg (1916–1930)

=== Directors of the Institute of Oriental Studies (1934–1956) ===
- Sergey Fyodorovich Oldenburg (1930–1934)
- Aleksandr Nikolaevich Samoilovich (1934–1937)
- Vasily Vasilievich Struve (1937–1938)
- Aleksey Petrovich Barannikov (1938–1940)
- Vasily Vasilievich Struve (1940–1950)
- Serguey Pavlovich Tolstov (1950–1953)
- Vsevolod Igorevich Avdiev (1953–1954)
- Alexander Andreevich Guber (1954–1956)

=== Directors of the Leningrad/Saint Petersburg Branch of the IOS (1956–2007) ===
- Joseph Abgarovich Orbeli (1956–1961)
- Andrey Nikolaevich Kononov (1961–1963)
- Jury Ashotovich Petrosyan (1963–1996)
- Evgenij Ivanovich Kychanov (1997–2003)
- Irina Fedorovna Popova (2003–2007)

=== Directors of the Institute of Oriental Manuscripts (2007–present) ===
- Irina Fedorovna Popova (2007–)

== Collections ==
The IOM has a collection of more than 100,000 manuscripts and early printed books, encompassing about 65 different languages, including Arabic, Armenian, Chinese, Ethiopian, Georgian, Hebrew, Japanese, Korean, Kurdish, Manchu, Mongolian, Persian, Sanskrit, Sogdian, Tajik, Tangut, Tibetan, Turkic, and Uyghur.

=== Arabic collection ===
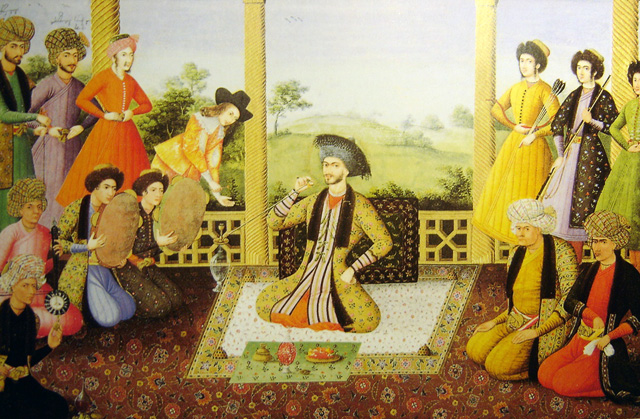
Miniature of Suleiman I of Persia by Aliquli Jabbadar (IOM Album E 14, folio 89). The manuscript was acquired by Tsar Nicholas II in 1909, and transferred from the Russian Museum to the Asiatic Museum in 1921.

The foundation for the manuscript collection at the Asiatic Museum were some 700 Arabic script manuscripts belonging to Jean-Baptiste Louis-Jacques Rousseau that were acquired in 1819 (500 manuscripts) and 1826 (200 manuscripts). The first director of the Asiatic Museum, Christian Martin Frähn, augmented the museum's holdings in Arabic manuscripts, and by 1828 the museum housed some 851 Arabic, Persian and Turkic manuscripts. However, the collection of Arabic manuscripts did not grow substantially until the early 20th century. In 1915, Vladimir Alexeyevich Ivanov purchased some 1,057 manuscripts from Bukhara, and in 1916–1917, S. V. Ter-Avetisyan, curator of the Caucasian Museum in Tbilisi, sent a large number of manuscripts that he had collected to the Asiatic Museum, including more than a thousand Arabic manuscripts.

=== Tibetan collection ===
The IOM has one of the largest collections of Tibetan books and manuscripts in the world, comprising over 20,000 catalogued items, as well as many as yet uncatalogued items. The history of the collection dates back to the 1720s when Tibetan texts from a ruined monastery along the Irtysh River were brought back to Saint Petersburg. During the 18th and 19th centuries more Tibetan and Tibeto-Mongolian woodblock-printed books were collected from Buryat monasteries in Siberia. Other Tibetan and Mongolian books were sent back to Russia by members of the Russian Spiritual Mission in China during the 19th century. By the start of the 20th century the Asiatic Museum had the largest collection of Tibetan books and manuscripts in Europe, but it was still deficient in some areas. The remaining gaps in the collection were filled by Gombojab Tsybikov and B. Baradiyn (1878–1937) who visited Tibet in 1899–1902 and 1905–1907 respectively.

=== Manuscripts from Khara-khoto ===
The IOM holds the world's foremost collection of manuscripts written in the extinct Tangut language, which were collected by the explorer Pyotr Kozlov from the Western Xia fortress city of Khara-Khoto in Inner Mongolia during 1907–1909. The city had been abandoned in the late 14th century, and had been largely buried in sand for several hundred years. Kozlov unearthed thousands of manuscripts and woodblock prints, mostly written in the dead Tangut script, which had been preserved beneath the sands of Khara-Khoto. The manuscripts, books and archaeological artefacts that Kozlov brought back from Khara-Khoto were originally housed in the museum of Alexander III of Russia in Saint Petersburg, but the manuscripts and printed books were transferred to the Asiatic Museum in 1911. In addition to the several thousand Tangut texts, the Kozlov Collection includes about 660 manuscripts and printed books in Chinese, mostly Buddhist texts, as well as about 120 Tibetan texts.

=== Manuscripts from Turpan and Dunhuang ===
Sergey Oldenburg, director of the Asiatic Museum from 1916, made two expeditions to Central Asia (1909–1910 and 1914–1915). During the first expedition Oldenburg explored a number of sites around Turpan, including Shikchin, Yarkhoto and Kucha, and collected murals, paintings, terracottas, and about one hundred manuscripts, mostly fragments written in the Brahmi script. During his second expedition Oldenburg surveyed the Mogao Caves at Dunhuang, and revisited some of the sites in Turpan that he had visited during his first expedition. He found a large number of artefacts and manuscript fragments (nearly 20,000 fragments, some of them tiny) at Dunhuang, and also purchased about 300 scrolls from local people. The IOM holds the more than 19,000 manuscript fragments and 365 manuscript scrolls collected from Dunhuang by Oldenburg, as well as about thirty manuscripts collected by Sergey Malov during an expedition to Khotan during 1909–1910, and some 183 Uyghur manuscripts collected by N. N. Krotkov, the Russian Consul in Urumqi and Ghulja.

=== Individual manuscripts and printed books ===
- Nova N 176 — the only known complete manuscript of the extinct Khitan language, written in the Khitan large script.
- Pearl in the Palm — 12th century woodblock printing of a bilingual Chinese–Tangut glossary

== See also ==
- International Dunhuang Project
