= Library of the Russian Academy of Sciences =

Federal library in Russia

Coordinates: 59.944°N 30.297°E

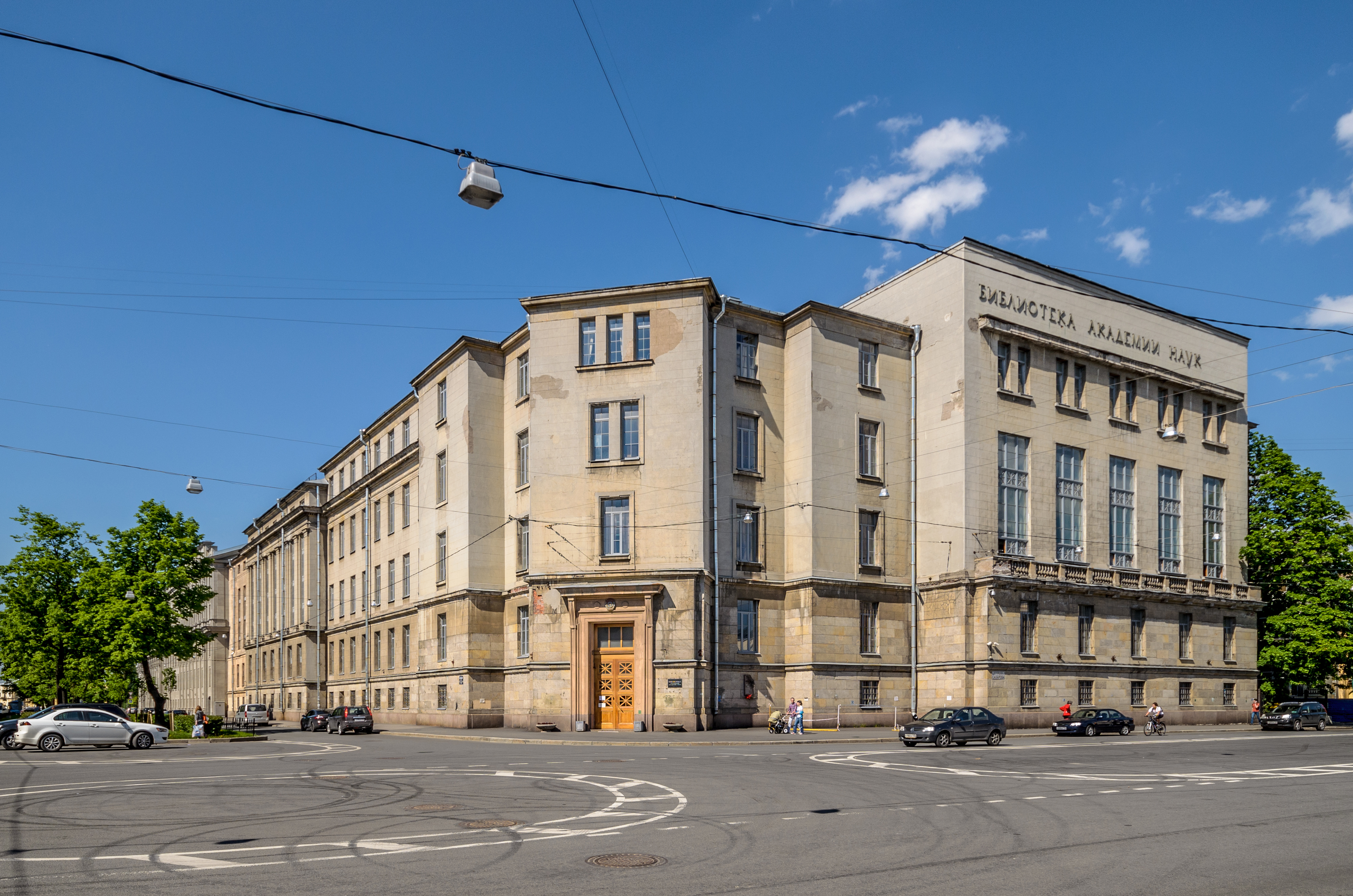
- Location: Saint Petersburg
- Established: 1714

Collection
- Size: 20.5 million (central collection or central library) overall collection of more than 26.5 million items

Access and use
- Population served: employees of the Russian Academy of Sciences and scholars with higher education

Other information
- Director: Valery Leonov
- Website: http://www.rasl.ru

The Library of the Russian Academy of Sciences (Russian: Библиотека Российской академии наук (БАН)) is a large state-owned Russian library based in Saint Petersburg on Vasilievsky Island and open to employees of institutions of the Russian Academy of Sciences and scholars with higher education. It is a part of the academy and includes, besides the central collection, the library collections housed by specialized academic institutions in Saint Petersburg and other cities.

The library was founded in Saint Petersburg by a decree of Peter I in 1714 and subsequently included into the structure of the St. Petersburg Academy of Sciences. Since 1747 all academic institutions and since 1783 all publishers in the country have been legally obliged to provide the library with a free copy of each published item.

In 1924-1925 the collections were transferred to the new building built for the library in 1914 and occupied by a military hospital during the First World War. During the siege of Leningrad in 1941-1944 the collections stayed in the besieged city and the library was open.

On February 15, 1988, the library suffered the most catastrophic fire in its history which destroyed or damaged a considerable part of the collections, it had destroyed 298.000 books of the total 12 million housed, two to three million more were damaged by heat and smoke. 734,465 copies volumes initially became damp due to firefighting foam. Many of the lost volumes were part of the Baer Collection of foreign scientific works: 152.000 were lost. The rest 146.000 were Russian books, many of them early scientific and medical books from the 17th, 18th, and 19th centuries.

The damp books damaged by fire extinguishment were initially frozen. Then a radio appeal was broadcast for citizens to dry the damp books in their homes. By late March 1988 93% of the damp books had been dried in that way and returned to the library. However, about 10,000 books became moldy.

In a 2018 article on the web site "Siberian scientific news" it says that the fire destroyed 298 061 copy of monographs and periodicals; 146,716 books in Russian; 152,245 copies of foreign publications before 1930, arranged according to the classification system of academician Karl Baer (including the legendary Baer fund - about 62 thousand folios). The lost fund was replenish with 222,336 copies from 764 institutions were accepted for the restoration of funds. The loss of 62% of domestic books and 8% of publications from the Baer collection has been replenished. Also destroyed were 20,640 binders, or one third of the newspaper stock, this fund was also partially restored.

Other sources say that 45% of the burned books in Russian and 13% in foreign were recovered.

Before the fire, as of October 1, 1986, the collection of the library and libraries subordinate to it consisted of 17,288,365 items.

== History of the Library ==
=== Library of the Academy of Sciences in the 18th century ===
The library of the Academy of Sciences was founded in 1714 by Tsar Peter I. No government act on the establishment of the library has come down to us. However, there is evidence of this in the book of the first Russian historian of St. Petersburg, curator of the Russian book fund of the Library, Andrei Ivanovich Bogdanov (1696-1766). Describing the first libraries of St. Petersburg, he called the Library of the Imperial Academy of Sciences one of the earliest and most important, which, - he wrote, - “began to gather by the supreme decree of the Emperor Peter the Great from 1714, and in 1724 it was united into the Imperial Academy of Sciences".

Three collections were brought to the Summer Palace - the books of the Pharmaceutical Order from Moscow, the Gottorp library and the so-called library of the Dukes of Courland. The fund consisted of about 2,000 books in Russian and many European languages. In 1728 the Library was opened to the public in a new building on Vasilievsky Island. This building housed the Academy of Sciences until 1787, the Library until 1924, and the Kunstkamera is still located today. The priority right to use the Library after 1728 was assigned to academicians, but other educated people could also visit it. Moreover, this mode of access to the Library was maintained until the 1770s.

On December 5, 1747, when the Library was in the Kunstkamera building, the first fire broke out. The reason was faulty chimneys. During the fire, the Gottorp Globe and the tower of the building burned down, and the things stored in the Kunstkamera and books from the library suffered more from water and careless movement than from fire. In the Russian part of the Chamber Catalog, librarian A.I. Bogdanov in his working copy indicated exactly which books were burned. Their total number is 44 titles (33 printed and 11 handwritten books) from the catalog of Russian books and more than 200 foreign publications.

The news of the new library in St. Petersburg spread far beyond the borders of Russia. The French educator Denis Diderot, the author of about 400 articles in the "Encyclopedia", in 1751 in the second volume placed a review article on the libraries of Europe. It contains the first mention of the Library of the Academy of Sciences and the role of Peter the Great in its creation. "This great monarch has collected very significant funds for the library of his St. Petersburg Academy, which is provided in large numbers with books in all fields of science."

=== Library Fund in the 18th century ===
At the time of the move to Kikiny Chambers, the Library's holdings consisted of approximately 6,000 volumes. From 1716 to 1719 the Library received private collections of A. Pitkarn, A. Vinius, G. Palmstrik, R. Areskin. By the end of 1719, the funds totaled about 10,000 volumes, and by the end of 1747 - about 22,300 books. Since 1747, the Library began to receive mandatory copy of all academic publications; since 1783 - an obligatory copy of all publications published in Russia.

The first book on the history of the Library was written by its employee with 32 years of experience, an adjunct of the Imperial Academy of Sciences (1766), a member of the Imp. Free Economic Society, non-commissioned librarian Johann Konrad (Ivan Grigorievich) Buckmeister. “An experience about the Library and the Cabinet of curiosities and the history of the natural St. Petersburg Imperial Academy of Sciences, published in French by Johann Buckmeister, a sub-librarian of the Academy of Sciences, and translated into Russian by Vasily Kostygov.It presented a complete and detailed description of the book fund of the Library of the Academy of Sciences at the end of the 18th century.

=== Library of the Academy of Sciences in the 19th century ===
The 19th century was a period of further development and prosperity of the Library. Its primary task was to serve science. The position of the Library within the Academy of Sciences continued to be determined by the statutes of the Academy. The charter of 1803 - "Regulations of the Academy of Sciences" - in Chapter X "On the Academy's scientific accessories" defined the Library as an independent institution, separated it from the Kunstkamera, allocating two academicians for their management. Geographically, they were both together until 1924.

According to the Charter of 1803, the Academy of Sciences was freed from educational and educational functions and became a purely scientific and research institution. The Charter also stipulated the staff of the Library, the procedure for managing it and the ways of acquiring its funds - "All printing houses in the empire are obliged to send one copy of each book published in these, to the library of the Academy of Sciences."

In 1818, the president of the Academy of Sciences S.S. Uvarov took measures to replenish funds and streamline their use. The library was divided into two parts - from books "in the Slavic and Russian languages" and "from books in all other languages". For more than a century, the main Library of the Academy of Sciences consisted of two independent subdivisions - I (Russian) department and II (Foreign) department.

The leaders of the Library, and first of all academician K.M. Baer and academicians Ya.I. Berednikov, M.A. Korkunov and A.A. Kunik went to great lengths to uncover the funds for readers. Alphabetical and systematic catalogs were created in both departments. In 1836, the rules for the use of the library, developed by academician Baer, were introduced, in which it was recognized that "the scientific study of books should be limited only to the minimum extent" and that the Library will be able to fulfill its tasks the better, the longer and more often access is open into it.

In the 19th century. the structure of the Library became more complex, which required an increase in staff. In 1883, in the I (Russian) department, the Slavic department was allocated as an independent unit; in 1893 - the magazine department; in 1901 - the Manuscript Department and the Russian Book Department. A new formatting arrangement of funds was introduced, systems of library classification of academicians K.M. Baer, A.A. Kunik and others. In 1893 the staff of the Library was increased to 10 people; 9.5 million rubles were allocated for the purchase of books.

In the first half of the 19th century. from the libraries at the scientific institutions of the Academy, a network of special academic libraries began to be created. The first to enter it were the libraries of the Archive (1800), the Observatory (1804), the Numismatic Cabinet (1804–1806), the Botanical Garden (1809); libraries at academic museums: Asian, Botanical, Zoological; societies: Mineralogical, Geographic; at laboratories: Chemical (1881), Physiological (1889), Anatomy and Plant Physiology (1890), Special Zoological (1894), at the Main Physical Observatory, etc. Central and scientific libraries of research institutions expanded international connections and strengthened the authority of the academic library. By the end of the 19th century. there were 15 special academic libraries.

In the second half of the 19th century. The library experienced a great lack of space to accommodate book collections. Since the 1870s, efforts to expand the premises have been the leitmotif of many speeches by the heads of library departments: Academician A.A. Kunik (Russian branch), academician Carl Salemann (Foreign Department) and Master Eduards Volters, (Slavic branch). At the end of the 1880s. The library received the entire historical building of the Kunstkamera. However, the Academy again began to bother about the construction of a library building, which was built two decades later.

=== Library Fund in the 19th century. ===
The general idea of the growth of the book collections of the Library of the Academy of Sciences during this period is represented by the following figures: in the 1790s in the Library there were 40,000 volumes of books and manuscripts, in 1836 there were 90,000, in 1848 there were 112,753, and in 1862 there were 243,109. The foreign branch occupied a dominant position in terms of the size of the book fund, but a faster growth of funds of the Russian branch.

As in the 18th century, the Library continued to receive an obligatory copy of all Russian editions. The main sources of foreign literature were: purchase of books abroad, exchange of publications of the Academy of Sciences for publications of foreign scientific institutions, gifts of organizations and individual foreign scientists.

In 1862 LRAS(Library Of Russian Academy Of Sciences) received publications on book exchange from 150 Western European large scientific centers, and by the end of the 19th century. had 516 foreign partners. By the end of the 1880s the Slavic department was organized, in which about 10 thousand volumes were concentrated; by the end of the century, this figure increased several times.

In the 19th century, the library's holdings were replenished with a collection of maps of Russia of the Geographical Department, publications of domestic periodicals of the Ministry of Public Education, books of the Foreign Censorship Committee, periodicals donated by Alexander Polovtsov, a collection of books and manuscripts by V.A. Pivovarov, the libraries of E.E. Koeller, Johann Philipp Krug, Yakov Grot, Christian Martin Frähn, Anders Johan Sjögren, Fyodr Andreyevich Tolstoy. The receipts of books from the personal libraries of Karl Ernst von Baer, Yakov Zakharov, Franz Aepinus, William Henry Harvey, Friedrich von Adelung, Paul Fuss, Yakov Ivanovich Berednikov, Ludolf Stephani et al.

=== Library of the Academy of Sciences at the beginning of the 20th century. ===
The beginning of the twentieth century. was marked for the academic library by an increase in the staff up to 18 people, an increase in the amount for the purchase of literature.

On January 8, 1901, due to the dilapidated heating system, a fire broke out in the Library, during which more than 1,500 volumes of valuable publications were destroyed. This event hastened the decision on the construction of a new building for the Library.

In 1910, a government estimate was approved for the construction of a new building for the Library. It was completed in 1914, but due to the outbreak of the First World War, the development of the new building was impossible, since it was transferred to the Ministry of War, which housed the 166th Consolidated Evacuation Hospital in it. The Library moved from the old building on Universitetskaya Embankment to the new building on Birzhevaya Line, Building 1 in 1922–1924.

By 1919, there were fifteen libraries of academic institutions in Petrograd, adjacent to the Central Library, with a total number of books in 220 thousand volumes.Together with the Central Library (CB), they formed a single library fund of the Academy of Sciences.

=== The Library Fund at the beginning of the 20th century ===
By 1917, the book fund of the Library of the Academy of Sciences exceeded 1.5 million volumes. At the beginning of the twentieth century. Literature came to the Library from institutions in charge of censorship. All government agencies, universities, other educational institutions, scientific organizations and societies delivered their publications to the Library. Much revolutionary literature came from abroad through the Voss firm, as well as from emigrants, public organizations and individuals. Acquisition of the Manuscript Department proceeded successfully, its fund increased threefold in 17 years.

On October 9, 1925, during the celebration of the 200th anniversary of the Academy of Sciences, the official opening of the Library took place in a new building on Birzhevaya Line, 1. The area of the new library building was 12.5 thousand square meters. m, the total length of the shelves was about 47 km, which corresponded to the length of the line in a straight line from the Library to Lake Ladoga. Since 1925 the Library became known as the Library of the USSR Academy of Sciences (LUAS or LRAS). In the same period, four independent departments were allocated at the LRAS (Library Of The Russian Academy Of Sciences) - I (Russian), II (Foreign), III (Slavic), IV (Manuscript), in turn divided into a number of departments. Later, the V (Cartographic) Department and the VI Department (Reading Room) were formed.

=== Library of the Academy of Sciences during the war and the Leningrad blockade ===
During the Great Patriotic War (1941-1945) the Library of the Academy of Sciences was transferred to martial law. Already in July 1941, the most valuable materials of the seven million fund were prepared for evacuation to the rear of the country. The rapid approach of the front to Leningrad did not allow them to be sent to the rear: on September 8, 1941, the blockade ring was closed. All books and materials prepared for shipment remained in the Library. They were moved to the basement of the building, the windows were covered with sand, shields and covered with earth.

The winter of 1941/1942 was especially difficult for the Library, as well as for the whole of Leningrad. There was no public transport in the city. Electric lighting was turned off in the Library, water supply and central heating did not work. Bombing and shelling intensified. The BAN building suffered a lot of damage. Snow fell into the book depositories, the temperature in the building dropped to 25 degrees. The people were exhausted and exhausted by hunger. Of the 150 people left in the LRAS according to the staff schedule at the beginning of the war, about 80% of employees died... Throughout the entire period of the war and the Leningrad blockade, a subscription and a reading room worked in the Library, mobile libraries were created for the Leningrad divisions of the people's militia, for military units and hospitals. The library served not only the scientists of the Academy who remained in the besieged city, but also workers of defense enterprises, military personnel, doctors. The Library staff continued to organize exhibitions of literature, lectures, and carried out reference and bibliographic work. Librarians continued to work to ensure the safety of their valuable book collections, and also carried out the search and rescue of unattended private collections and libraries in the city.

During the wartime, the collections of the Library received book collections of left or deceased scientists: academician Sergei Zhebelev on the history of the ancient world, academicians Pavel Kokovtsov and Fyodor Shcherbatskoy on Oriental Studies. Some collections were donated to scientific libraries of academic institutions. In 1943–1944. evacuated employees and regular readers returned to BAN - scientists from the institutions of the Academy of Sciences, the teaching staff of higher educational institutions. Libraries of the Leningrad institutions of the Academy of Sciences resumed their work. Since 1944, the Library of the Academy of Sciences becomes the keeper of the Armored Fund of the Presidium of the USSR Academy of Sciences. This fund is a collection of publications of the Academy since its foundation.

=== Library of the Academy of Sciences in the second half of the 20th century ===
In the 1940s and 1950s, the Library received a number of valuable collections and private collections. Manuscripts and rare editions were purchased from old book stores and private individuals. Among the interesting and valuable: an extensive collection of Russian ex-libris, collected by E.A. Rosenblat, a collection of books that belonged to one of the prominent figures of the Petrine era, Theophilakt Lopatinsky; books published by Ivan Fedorov, Pyotr Mstislavets and others, handwritten and early printed books.

The international relations of the Library expanded. By 1963 LRAS exchanged publications with 2.433 institutions in 91 countries of the world; maintained contacts with 69 academies of sciences, 100 libraries, almost 500 universities and colleges, 82 government agencies, 123 museums, scientific institutions, etc.

In 1964 the Library celebrated its 250th anniversary. The centralized LRAS system, the staff included 660 employees and served already about 30 thousand readers.

The library carried out serious scientific activities in the field of bibliography, scientific description of documents and publication of handwritten materials, generalization of the experience of library work and the history of LRAS. The LRAS organized the Publishing Department and restoration and printing workshops. In 1974, the Department of Mechanization and Automation of Library Processes was established.

== Collections ==
=== Russian Literature collections ===
The collection of domestic publications is located in 17 book depositories on eight half-floors of the main building of the Library.

About 30% of the national fund is made up of periodicals and continuing publications in Russian and other languages of our country.

The most historically valuable parts of the Russian collection are Russian books and brochures of the 19th - early 20th centuries. and domestic periodicals and continuing publications for the same period.

==== Domestic books and brochures ====
This part of the fund was formed in the 19th century and forms a book collection and arranged in a systematic manner on the basis of the classification developed by the director of the Russian branch, academician A.A. Kunik. The fund is organized by branches of knowledge in accordance with the ideas of that time and contains literature obtained on the basis of the so-called legal deposit. Many editions have leather bindings, are beautifully designed and engraved. At the beginning of the 20th century, inventory and partly formatted arrangements were adopted, introduced by the director, academician A.A. Shakhmatov. Since 1930, the book collections of Russian literature have been organized according to a single format-chronological arrangement.

==== Domestic periodicals and continuing publications ====
The fund contains periodicals of the oldest scientific societies, including "Scientific Notes of the Russian Technical Society" (1867–1917), which published articles by prominent Russian scientists D.I. Mendeleev, P.N. Yablochkov et al., "Journal of the Russian Physicochemical Society" (1869-1930), on the pages of which the works of the largest representatives of Russian science were placed: A.S. Popov, N.A. Menshutkin, N.D. Zelinsky and others.

The collection contains complete sets of magazines published by Russian revolutionary democrats, including Sovremennik, Otechestvennye zapiski, edited by N.G. Chernyshevsky, N.A. Nekrasov, M.E. Saltykov-Shchedrin and others; sets of Russian satirical magazines from 1905 to 1906 and a number of other pre-revolutionary publications.

==== Library of the historian and philologist, academician A.A. Kunik ====
The national fund includes several private collections. The largest of them is the personal library of Arist Aristovich Kunik, a famous historian and long-term director of the Russian branch of the LARS. The books of this collection bear the security stamp “From the books of A.A. Kunik ". This collection contains literature on the history of Russia and Scandinavia, rare editions and Russian books of the 18th century. A.A. Kunik also collected brochures on various topics, reprints, clippings of articles from magazines, bound them and created thematic convolutes. A.A. Kunik was processed in the late 1920s with funds allocated to work with the unencrypted fund of the LRAS(Library of the Russian Academy of Sciences).

==== Selected book collections of the national fund ====
In the 1930s, a collection of literature "group processing and storage" was organized as part of the national fund . This fund is completed, basically, at the expense of that part of the legal deposit of works of the press, which, due to their homogeneity, can be grouped.

A special collection includes literature in the languages of the peoples of the former USSR.

A special collection contains the works of the founders of Marxism-Leninism, including the works of K. Marx, F. Engels, V.I. Lenin and I.V. Stalin, published in Russian and the languages of the peoples of the USSR, with the exception of the first and rare editions.

Since 1951, a collection of abstracts of dissertations has been formed as part of the main fund, which currently has about half a million copies.

=== Foreign Literature Collection ===
The collection of foreign editions of the main storage is located on 4 floors in fourteen book depositories. 25% - books and brochures, 75% - periodicals and continuing publications.

At present, along with the modern (format-chronological) arrangement of literature, several historically established arrangement systems have been preserved. The LRAS foreign fund includes publications with a large chronological coverage - from 1601 to the present.

=== Newspaper fund ===
The LRAS fund contains, about 9 million magazines, over 26 thousand newspaper titles and that is just the titles the overall number of newspapers stored are in hundred of thousands of individual newspapers.

The newspaper fund of the main storage of the department of funds and services represents the largest part of the newspaper fund of the LRAS(Library of the Russian Academy of Sciences). It includes:

- foreign newspapers from 1730 to the present
- Russian pre-revolutionary newspapers from 1825 to 1917
- newspapers published in Russia in foreign languages - "Rossika" (1711-1917)
- domestic newspapers from 1917 to the present

As a result of the fire in 1988, losses amounted to 0.7% for Russian pre-revolutionary newspapers, Rossika - 33%, Soviet newspapers in the most valuable part of this collection from 1918 to 1954. - 75%, foreign - 7% In addition, more than 15 thousand newspaper sets were affected by water, steam and high temperatures. All subsequent years, active work was carried out to restore the lost editions with the help of domestic and foreign libraries. As a result, it has already been possible to replenish about 60% of Soviet newspapers, 25% of the collection of "Rossika".

The newspaper fund of the main storage is completed:

- at the expense of a legal deposit, the receipt of which has been restored after an almost thirty-year break since 1994;
- through subscription and purchase.

Since 1989 a fund of informal newspapers has been formed. Foreign newspapers are exchanged through the international book exchange sector of the library acquisition department.

The newspaper collection contains incomplete sets, from the 1920s to the 1980s and complete sets of newspapers such as «New-York Times» (1917- 1986), «Times» (1931-1986), «Monde» (1932 - 1986) and others.

== See also ==
- List of libraries in Russia
