= Asiatic Museum =

Museum in St. Petersburg, now part of Institute of Oriental Manuscripts

Coordinates: 59.9408°N 30.3029°E

The Asiatic Museum (Азиатский музей) in Saint Petersburg was one of the first museums of Asian art in Europe. Its existence spanned 112 years from 1818 to 1930 when it was incorporated into the Institute of Oriental Manuscripts of the Russian Academy of Sciences.

In 1818, the Russian Academy of Sciences (RAS) learned that Jean-Baptiste Rousseau (1780–1831), the French consul at Aleppo and Tripoli (then both part of the Ottoman Empire), was selling his extensive collection of manuscripts written in the Arabic script. In November of that year, the president of the RAS, Count Sergey Uvarov, wrote to the Board of the RAS requesting that a separate room be put aside in the Academy's cabinet of curiosities for storing this collection of manuscripts (which was eventually purchased by the RAS in two tranches, in 1819 and 1825), as well as other medals, manuscripts and books of oriental origin already in the Museum of the Imperial Academy of Science. The result was the establishment of the Asiatic Museum (Russian: Азиатский музей) of the RAS, in Saint Petersburg.

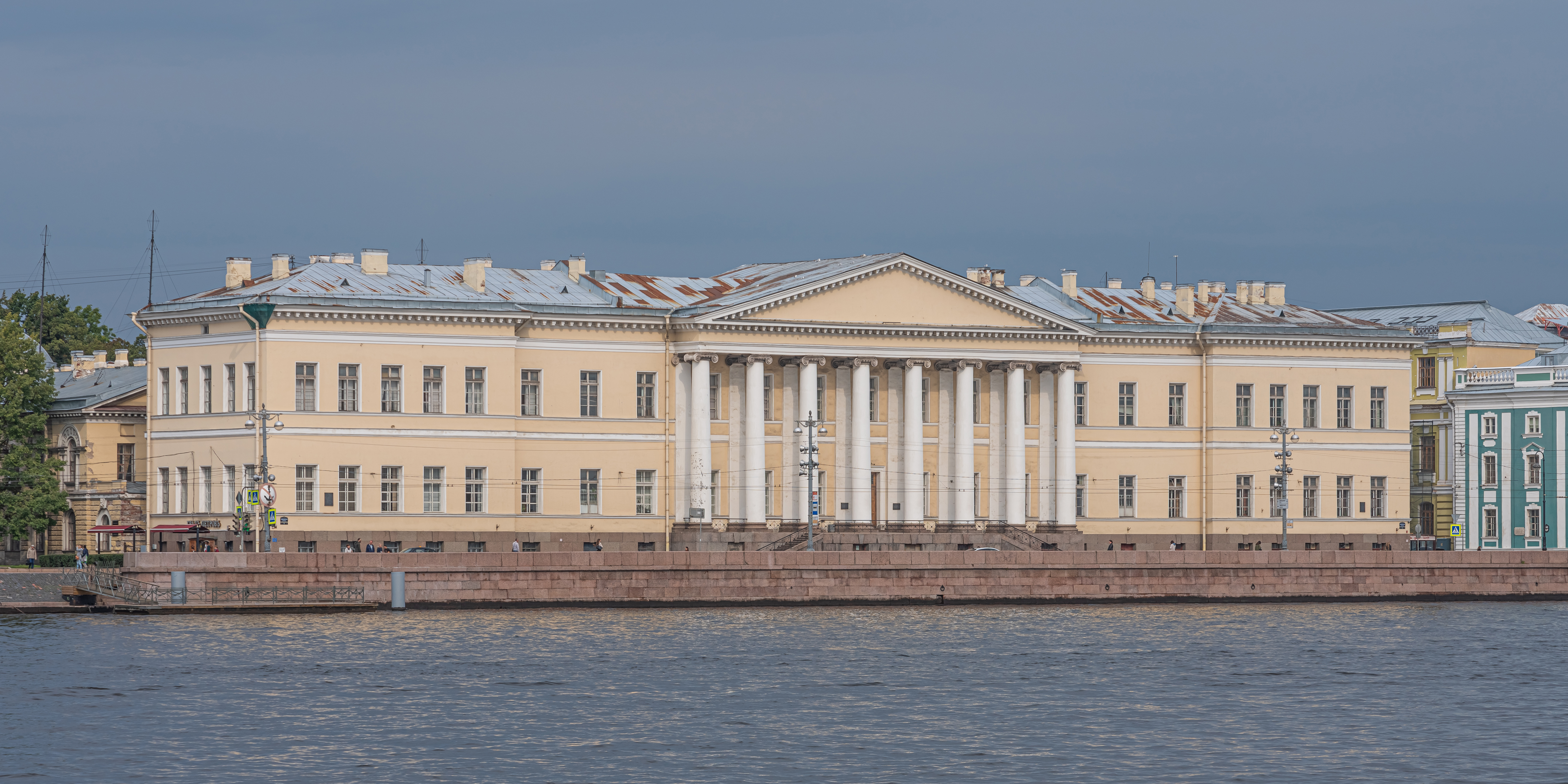
The museum was housed in the Quarenghi-designed Neoclassical building wedged between the Kunstkammer and the Twelve Collegia

== List of directors ==
- Christian Martin Frähn (1818–1842)
- Johannes Albrecht Bernhard Dorn (1842–1881)
- Victor von Rosen (1881–1882)
- Ferdinand Johann Wiedemann (1882–1885)
- Friedrich Wilhelm Radloff (1885–1890)
- Karl Germanovich Salemann (1890–1916)
- Sergey Fyodorovich Oldenburg (1916–1930)
