= Chrestomathy =

Collection of literary passages for studying

A chrestomathy (/krɛˈstɒməθi/ kreh-STOM-ə-thee; from the Ancient Greek χρηστομάθεια khrēstomátheia 'desire of learning', from χρηστός khrēstós 'useful' + μανθάνω manthánō 'learn') is a collection of selected literary passages (usually from a single author); a selection of literary passages from a foreign language assembled for studying the language; or a text in various languages, used especially as an aid in learning a subject.

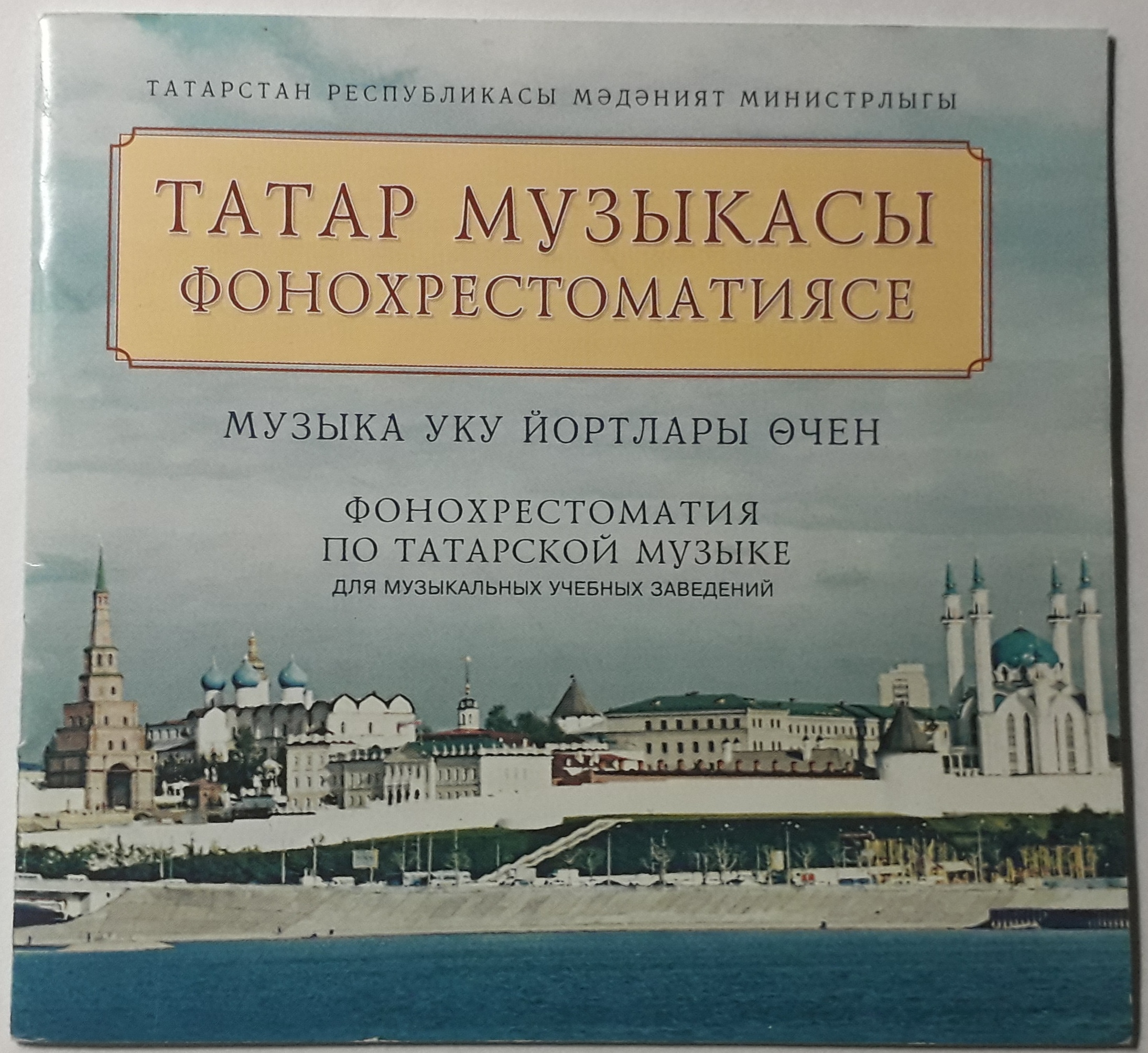
A "phono-chrestomathy" of Tatar music

In philology or in the study of literature, it is a type of reader that presents a sequence of example texts, selected to demonstrate the development of language or literary style. It is different from an anthology because of its didactic purpose.

== Examples ==
- Bernhard Dorn, A Chrestomathy of the Pushtū or Afghan language, St. Petersburg: Imperial Academy of Sciences, 1847
- H. L. Mencken, A Mencken Chrestomathy: His Own Selection of his Choicest Writing, New York: Alfred P. Knopf, 1949
- L. L. Zamenhof, Fundamenta Krestomatio de la Lingvo Esperanto, Paris: Hachette, 1903
- Edward Ullendorff, A Tigrinya Chrestomathy, Stuttgart: Steiner Werlag Wiesbaden GmbH, 1985.
- Bilingual Greek-Latin Grammar, by Georgios Dimitriou, 1785, that contained personal observations, Epistles and Maxims, as well as biographies of notable men.
- Rosetta Code, "a programming chrestomathy site", which "present[s] solutions to the same task in as many different [computer] languages as possible".
- The Ibis Chrestomathy, dealing "solely with words that have a claim to naturalization within the English language".
- Heather Christle, The Crying Book, Catapult: 2019. Explores the subject of crying and tears in a numbered series of extremely short essays.

== See also ==
- Lord's Prayer § Use as a language comparison tool
- Parallel text
- Text corpus
