= Institute of Oriental Studies of the Russian Academy of Sciences =

Research institute in Moscow, Russia

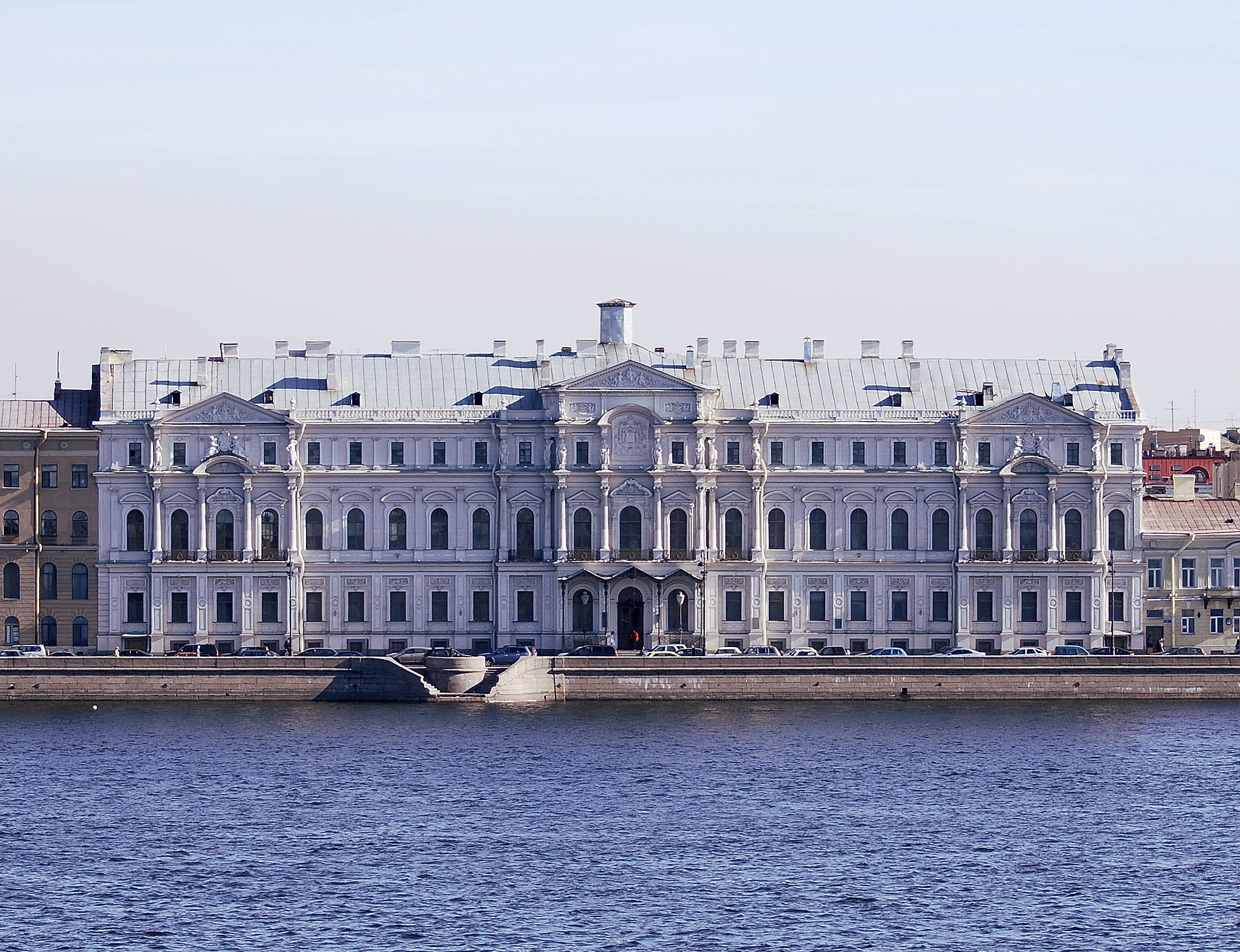
The Novo-Mikhailovsky Palace on Palace Quay is the home to the Institute of Oriental Manuscripts (formerly the St. Petersburg branch of the Institute of Oriental Studies)

The Institute of Oriental Studies of the Russian Academy of Sciences (Russian: Институт востоковедения Российской Академии Наук), formerly Institute of Oriental Studies of the USSR Academy of Sciences, is a Russian research institution for the study of the countries and cultures of Asia and North Africa.

The institute is located in Moscow. It formerly was located in Saint Petersburg, but in 2007 the Saint Petersburg branch was reorganized into a separate Institute of Oriental Manuscripts.

== History ==
The Institute of Oriental Studies of the Russian Academy of Sciences (RAS) history began in 1818, when an Asiatic Museum under the Imperial Academy of Sciences was set up in St. Petersburg. It was a depository of oriental manuscripts, a museum with exposition for visitors, a scientific and organizing center for oriental studies as well as a library for academic research.

At the beginning of the 20th century, by the 100th anniversary of its foundation, the Asian Museum became an Oriental center with a collection of manuscripts in 45 oriental languages and a library. In 1929–30 the Oriental Department of the Academy of Sciences was reorganized, and the Institute of Oriental Studies was created on the basis of the Museum under the Academy of Sciences of the USSR. In 1950, the institute was transferred to Moscow.

Under Soviet leadership, the institute was tasked with political work as well as basic research. For example, the program for 1953 included "unmasking the colonial policy of imperialism" and opposing "the lying falsifications of bourgeois Orientalists, and of humanity-hating race 'theories'."

In 2005, the RAS separated the IOS from its St. Petersburg branch, giving the latter independent status as the Institute of Eastern Manuscripts.

In 2013, the Russian government transferred control of the IOS, together with all other RAS academic institutes, to a government agency Federal Agency for Scientific Organizations (FASO). In 2018, Vladimir Putin's greeting to the IOS 200th anniversary celebration noted the importance of its "providing expert support for foreign policy decisions and promoting Russia's strategic interests."

Now, the Institute of Oriental Studies of the Russian Academy of Sciences is a research center where history and culture, economics and politics, languages and literature of the countries of Asia and North Africa are studied. The chronology covers the history of the Orient from antiquity to the present day. Most scientific centers and departments of the institute conduct research on certain countries and regions (e.g., Center for Arab Studies, Center for Japanese Studies, Center for Indian Studies, etc.). Some departments conduct research on problems of the Orient (in particular, the Center for Energy and Transport Studies, etc.). The institute's depositories contain ancient books and manuscripts, exceeding one million volumes.

The institute develops contacts with the Indian Council for Social Sciences Researches and with some universities of India, with the International Association for Mongol Studies as well as with the scientific and non-governmental organization of Arab countries (e.g. ALECSO).

Institute publishing includes the following:

- Southeast Asia: current problems of development,
- Eastern Archives,
- Epigraphics of the Orient,
- Japan, Altaica and Irano-Slavica.
- Vostok/Oriens for specialists,
- The magazine Asia and Africa Today for the general public,
- Institute of Africa of the RAS.

The institute founded the Oriental University (www.orun.ru), which trains people in regional studies and orientalists for scientific and teaching work, public service, to work at international organizations and commercial enterprises, etc.

== Internet journal New Eastern Outlook ==
According to its website, this journal primarily focuses on the region from "Japan and the remote coasts of Africa" but also examines events elsewhere "as they relate to the Orient." In 2019, Kevin Poulsen in The Daily Beast accused it of being a source of Russian propaganda and fake news.

In 2017, Politico published the titles of some article appearing in New Eastern Outlook:

- "Ukraine’s Ku Klux Klan — NATO’s New Ally."
- "Proof: Turkey Did 2013 Sarin Attack and Did This One Too"
- "If NATO wants peace and stability it should stay home" and
- "Brussels, NATO and the Globalists in Total Disarray."

According to the United States Department of State (2020), the journal is a "pillar of Russia's disinformation and propaganda system", which "promotes disinformation and propaganda focused primarily on the Middle East, Asia, and Africa....while also obscuring its links to state-funded institutions."

Articles from New Eastern Outlook have been published by the American conspiracy site Veterans Today, a partnership which began in 2013.

== Partnerships and collaborations ==
There are scientific contacts with Turkey, India, Egypt, Japan, Iran, and China.

Institute research topics have included:

- "Comprehensive study of ethnogenesis, ethnic and cultural image of the people, contemporary ethnic processes, historical and cultural cooperation in Eurasia",
- "Studying the historical roots of terrorism, monitoring of xenophobia and extremism in Russian society, anthropology of extreme groups and subcultures, an analysis of the complex ethnic and religious factors in the local and global processes of the past and present",
- "Problems of the theory of historical process, summarizing the experience of social transformation and social potential of the history",
- "The evolution of human societies and civilizations: the man in the history and the history of everyday life. Retrospective analysis of forms and contents of relations between the authorities and society",
- "Study of the spiritual and aesthetic values of national and world literature and folklore",
- "Genesis and the interaction of social, cultural and linguistic communities",
- "The historical experience of social transformation and conflict".

== Structure ==
- Department of Israel
- Department of the History of the Orient
- Department of the History and Culture of the Ancient Orient
- Department of China
- Department of the Problems of International Relations
- Department of Korea and Mongolia
- Department of Asian Literatures
- Department of Monuments of Oriental Writing
- Department of Comparative Theoretical Studies
- Department of Comparative Culture Studies
- Department of Near and Middle East
- Department of CIS Countries
- Department of Southeast Asian Studies
- Department of Economics Research
- Department of South Pacific Research
- Asian Languages Department
- Center for Arabic and Islamic Studies
- Center for Indian Studies
- Center for Japanese Studies

== See also ==
- Govhar Bakhshaliyeva
- Moscow Institute of Oriental Studies, that operated 1920-1954
