= Georgios Dimitriou =

Greek author

Georgios Dimitriou (Greek: Γεώργιος Δημητρίου) was a Greek 18th-century author and scholar.

Dimitriou came from one of the notable and literate families of Gjirokaster, then Ottoman Empire. He was a native of that city, today located in southern Albania. He lived at the time when Ali Pasha was the local Ottoman ruler of Epirus. In 1783, he sent a report to the Austrian Empire that described Ali Pasha's background and the activities of his irregular troops in the region.

Dimitriou published two works. One in 1783, entitled Περιγραφή της Βόρειας Αλβανίας και Βόρειας Ηπείρου (Description of Northern Albania and Northern Epirus), which is considered of considerable historical value today. In 1785, he published in Venice a bilingual Greek-Latin Grammar that contained personal observations, Epistles and Maxims, as well as biographies of notable men. This work was in fact a collection of chrestomathy under the guise of a bilingual grammar. It was dedicated to Alexander II Mavrokordatos "Firaris", ruler of Moldavia.
