= New Michael Palace =

Palace in St. Petersburg

Coordinates: 59.944064°N 30.322132°E

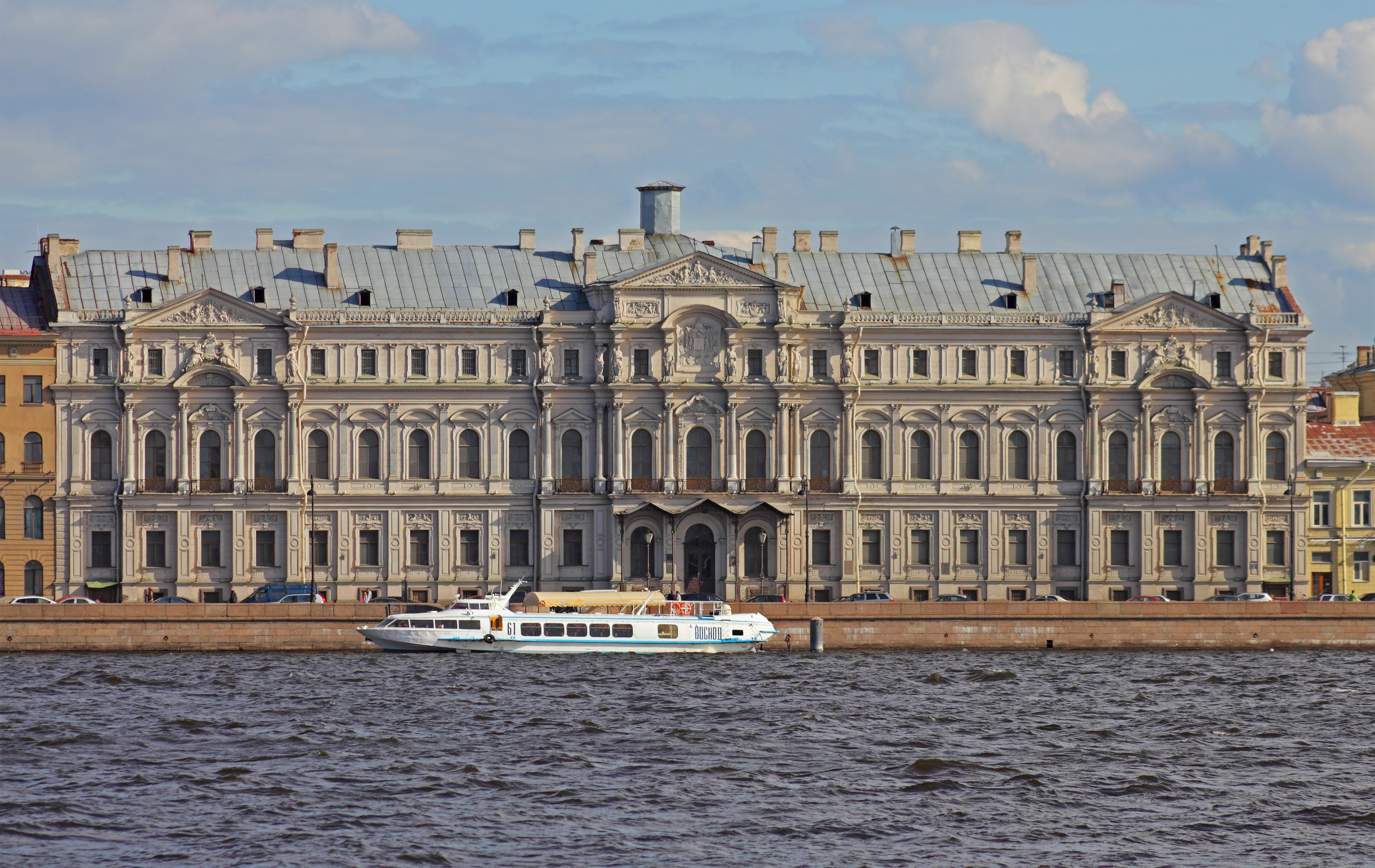
The New Michael Palace in 2012

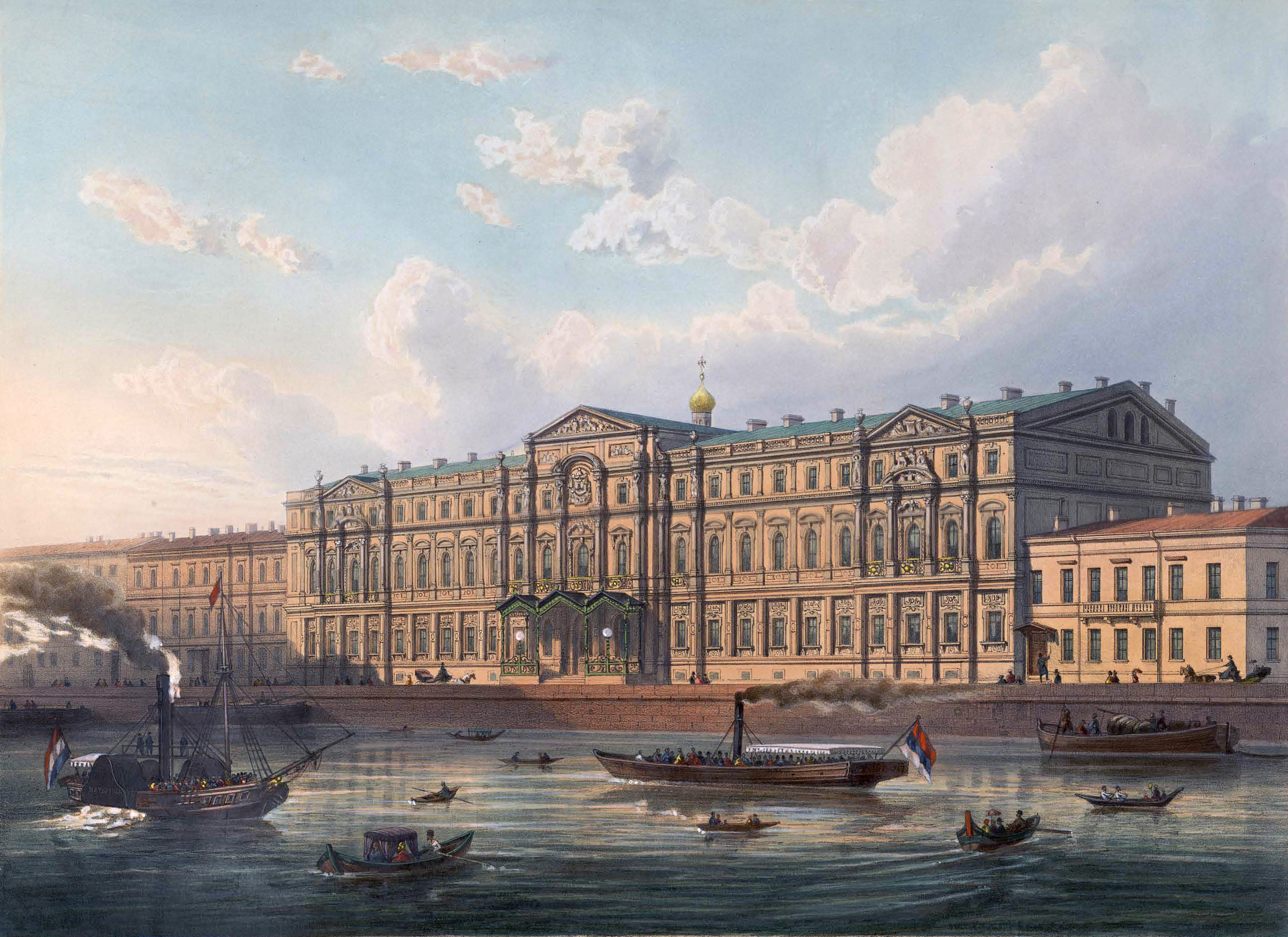
The New Michael Palace in the late 1850s

The New Michael Palace (Russian: Ново-Михайловский дворец, romanized: Novo-Mikhailovsky Dvorets) was the third Saint Petersburg palace designed by Andrei Stackenschneider for Nicholas I's children. It was built between 1857 and 1862 on the Palace Embankment, between the Hermitage Museum buildings (to the west) and the Marble Palace (to the east).

The palace was commissioned by Grand Duke Michael Nikolaevich of Russia on the occasion of his wedding to Cecilie of Baden. The design is a Revivalist medley of quotations from the Renaissance, Baroque, and the Louis XVI styles. The Rococo interiors are ornate yet airy. The statuary is by David Jensen. Some of the paintings are by Michael Zichy.

A residential wing of the palace (the so-called Equerry Wing) fronts on Millionnaya Street. Its decoration is not as riotous, but the distinctive curvilinear façade reflects the Italianate taste of the 1740s. The wing has its origin in the Baroque palace of Chancellor Tcherkassky whose design has been attributed to Pyotr Yeropkin.

After the Russian Revolution the palace housed a branch of the Communist Academy. Then in 1949 it was occupied by the Institute of Oriental Studies (IOS), later the Leningrad branch of the IOS, and it is currently occupied by its successor, the Institute of Oriental Manuscripts.

The building stands well preserved thanks to a major restoration effort of 2005–2009. The former stables were recently reconstructed with funds provided by Qaboos bin Said al Said in order to house some 1,000,000 Oriental books and manuscripts from the institute's collection.

== Construction ==
The wedding of Grand Duke Mikhail Nikolayevich took place on 18 August 1857. A grand-ducal residence had to be built for the newly formed family. The palace for the couple was decided to be built in the centre of the capital – on the Palace Embankment, approximately opposite the Peter and Paul Fortress. The residence was designed by the court architect of Nicholas I, Andrei Stackenschneider. His works included many residences such as the Beloselsky-Belozersky Palace in St Petersburg or the Leuchtenbergsky Palace in Peterhof.

During the construction process, several earlier structures were demolished. It was a common practice in St. Petersburg at that time. The architect's idea was to combine the nearby buildings into a single building, to give them a common facade.

The palace was built over a period of five years, from 1857 to 1862. The technologies used in the construction of the Novo-Mikhailovsky Palace were unique in Russia at the time. Metal rafters and beams were used in the construction of the palace, a new method for St Petersburg in the second half of the 19th century, although the technology had appeared in the 1820s and 1830s and was used mainly for roofing large premises (in palaces, mansions and public buildings). The rafters made of metal had fire resistance and structural durability. In the 1840s and 1850s, the method was finally introduced. The residence, also one of the first in the city, was equipped with plumbing. Another technical innovation was heating, which was done by introducing heated air into the rooms of the palace. The cost of the construction was 993,525 rubles.

In 1889, the palace was electrified.

== Facade design ==
The use of different architectural styles is characteristic of the architect Stackenschneider's work in the finishing and decor of the façades. The architect uses motifs of Rococo, Baroque, Renaissance and "Louis XIV style". In addition to Andrei Stackenschneider, the sculptor David Jensen also worked on the palace's façade, creating figures in terracotta for the façades. Compositionally, the building looks like a lodging house than a grand-ducal residence.

The main façade of the palace facing the Palace embankment is richly decorated. Carrara marble was used in the construction. The façade is distinguished by three risalites: the central one and two lateral ones. All the risalits are topped by pediments and the pediment of the central risalit is higher than that of the side ones. The moulding on the central and side pediments is the same. The baluster and ornamental vases on the broad entablature crown the façade.

On the third floor level, all three risalits are decorated with caryatids standing in various poses and supporting triangular gables, semi-circular arch gables or cornices. At the third floor level in the central risalite between the caryatids is a marble coat of arms of the Grand Duke. On the side, one between the caryatids is monograms of Mikhail Nikolaevich, supported by women in laurel wreaths. The windows on the third floor are rectangular, decorated with platbands and finished with a keystone or cornice. The walls of the third floor are decorated with pilasters with capitals and small sculptural panels.

At the first floor level in the spaces between the risalits the façade is evenly divided by fluted pilasters or columns of the Corinthian order. The architect used a spectacular motif of the Corinthian columns, continued by the figures of caryatids supporting the entablature. The windows in the risalits are rectangular, with semicircular endings. The central windows of the risalite floor are decorated with platbands and the cornice of the windows is made in Baroque style. The other windows are topped by triangular or semi-circular pediments. The central entrance is decorated with a triple tracery canopy and wrought-iron lattices, supported by twisted columns with lanterns.

== Interiors ==
The interior of the residence was in harmony with its external appearance. The interiors of the building, designed in the Classical style, contained elements of Rococo and Gothic[14]. The paintings of the halls, rooms and rooms were made by the artists M. A. Zichi and N. I. Tikhobrazov.

=== Ground floor ===
The ground floor contained the front door and also the private apartments of the Grand Duke's family: a Boudoir, a Bathroom and a Study. The walls of the private apartments were covered with patterned fabrics and the ceilings were decorated with stucco. All the rooms were equipped with fireplaces. The Study of the Grand Duke was luxuriously furnished. The walls of the room were decorated with walnut panels, and there was a carved walnut fireplace.

Among the living rooms, the room with a pool is especially distinguished for water procedures. The pool has not survived. The walls of the room were lined with pink imitation marble, framed with green marble details. The stone blocks were divided by marble pilasters of Doric order. The frieze was composed of bas-reliefs on which ancient scenes and heroes were depicted. The doors were decorated with gilded figures of dolphins.

The Main Entrance is represented by the Main Vestibule and the Grand Staircase. The Main Vestibule is decorated with eight columns and 18 pilasters made of grey granite and topped with white capitals. The Grand Staircase was made of marble. On the first floor, one of the walls of the staircase was made of glass, and the Winter Garden could be seen through it. The stairs led to the first floor, to a suite of other staterooms. The Winter Garden occupied the ground floor and the first floor under the House Church.

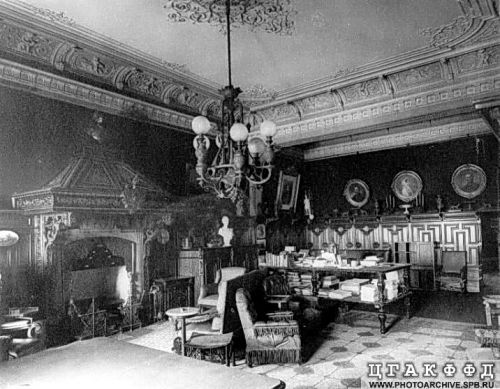
The Study room of Grand Duke Mikhail Nikolaevich

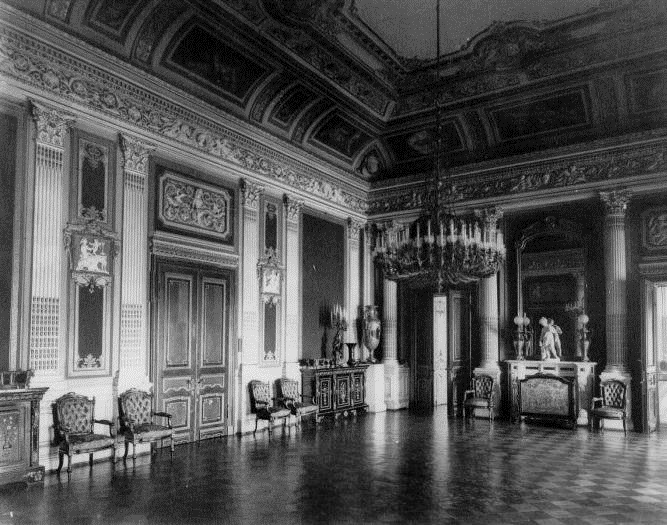
The Main Vestibule

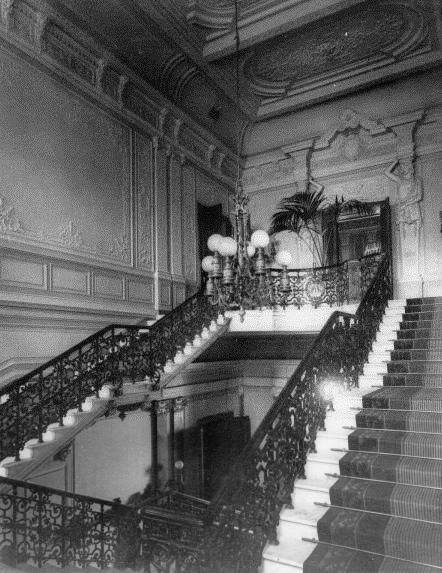
The Grand Staircase

=== First floor ===
On the first floor were rooms of the state enfilade. A Reception room, an oak Dining Room, a Banquet Hall, a Dance Hall and a Green Hall were arranged there. The Dining room had a tall fireplace decorated with carved oak and the Grand Duke's coat of arms. The walls of the room were covered with embossed leather and lined with carved oak. The walls of the Drawing rooms were draped in silk cloth. The ceilings were decorated with gilded mouldings. The parquet floors and the doors were made of different precious types of wood. Carved framed mirrors hang above marble fireplaces.

The double-height Dance Hall and the Banquet Hall are considered the most splendidly furnished rooms. The walls of the two halls have been perimetered by two-tiered colonnades, expressed by white columns of the Corinthian order.

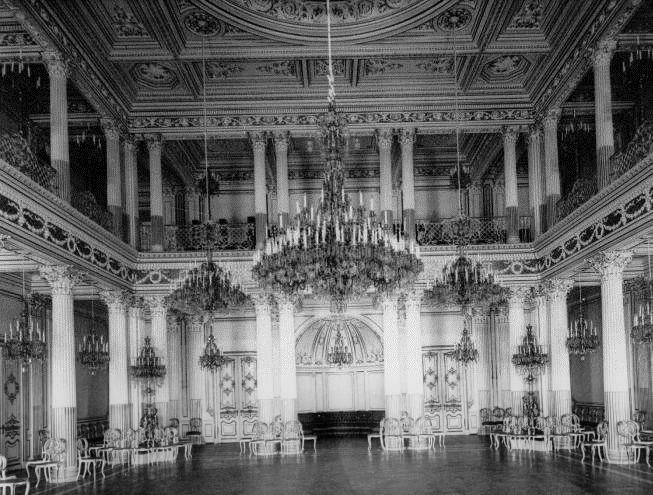
The Dance Hall

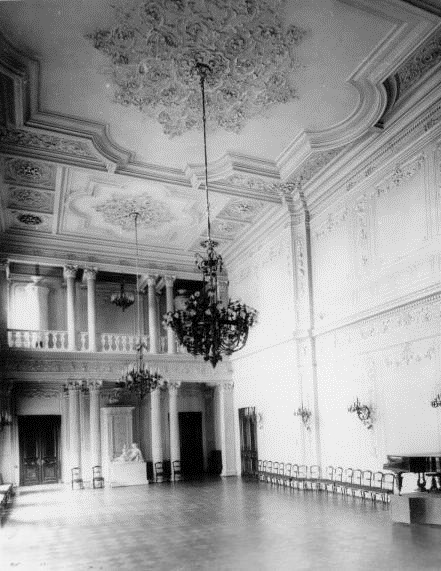
The Banquet Hall

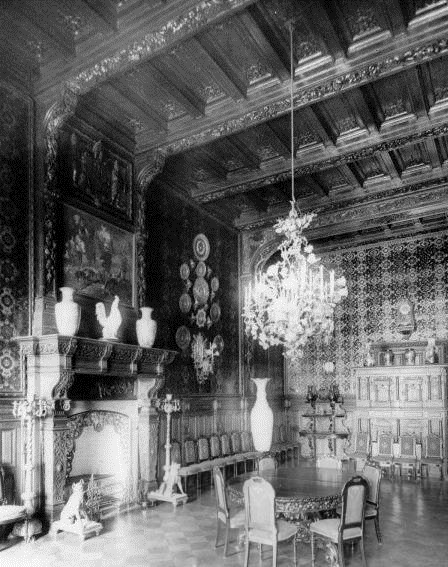
The Oak Dining Room

=== The Church of Archangel Michael ===
The Church of Archangel Michael was situated on the third floor of the palace and was a house church of the Grand Duke's family. Outside it was crowned with one gilded cupola, which was the highest point of the palace. On 9 December 1861, the church was consecrated in the name of the Archangel Michael, the patron saint of the Grand Duke. The paintings on the walls and the vault were done in the Russian style, "with golden arabesques on a blue background". A. E. Beideman painted the iconostasis and decorated the plafond.

In 1917, during the October Revolution, the premises were nationalised and the church was closed. Neither the iconostasis nor the murals have been preserved to this day. The gilded cupola was demolished.
