= Irina Fedorovna Popova =

Russian sinologist and historian (born 1961)

Irina Fedorovna Popova (Russian: Ирина Фёдоровна Попова; born September 28, 1961) is a Russian sinologist and historian. Since April 2003 she has been the Director of the Institute of Oriental Manuscripts of the Russian Academy of Sciences (IOM RAS) at Saint Petersburg, Russia. She is also Head of the Department of Manuscripts and Documents of the IOM RAS, and Full Professor at St Petersburg State University.

Popova has been a visiting scholar with the Center for Chinese Studies in Taipei (Taiwan), University of Pennsylvania (US), Nordic Institute of Asian Studies (Copenhagen, Denmark), and Peking University (China).

== Education ==
Popova graduated in 1983 from the St Petersburg State University (Faculty of Asian and African Studies, Department of the History of Far East), and completed her Ph.D. in 1989 at the Russian Academy of Sciences. She holds a Doctor of Sciences degree in history (2000) from the Russian Academy of Sciences. The subject of her Ph.D. thesis (in Russian) is "Rules for Emperors" ("Difan") by Tang Taizong as a source on the Chinese Political Thought of the 7th century, and the subject of her Doctoral thesis (in Russian) is The Theory of the State Rulership in the Early Tang China.

Honorary Professor of several universities in China: Lanzhou, Ningxia, Shandong, Peoples’ University of China (Beijing), Shaanxi Normal University (Xi’an), Honorary Doctor of the Institute of History of the Academy of Sciences of China. Member of the Council on Science and Education under the President of the Russian Federation (since 2020).

== Research ==
Basing primarily on the documents of the Tang dynasty, Popova has contributed to the study of imperial rulership in medieval China and the study of the influence of the political practice and imperial ideology in pre-modern China. She has introduced into the academic use the original documents from Dunhuang and Turfan, Chinese epigraphic texts, visual sources on the history of Qing dynasty, archival material on the history of Russian expeditions in Central Asia and history of the Oriental studies.

Popova is an author of more than 200 academic works [6], including 9 monographs (5 of them are collective); editor of 19 collected works; Editor-in-chief of academic journals: “Pis'mennye pamiatniki Vostoka” (“Written Monuments of the Orient” in Russian), “Strany i Narody Vostoka” (“Countries and Peoples of the Orient”), “Written Monuments of the Orient” (English version); Deputy Chair of the editorial board of the academic series “Pamiatniki pismennosti Vostoka” (“Written Monuments in the Oriental Scripts”). Member of the editorial boards of Russian and foreign academic periodicals, including “Turfan Studies” (“Tulufan Yanjiu”, in China), “Study of the Documents in the Chinese Minorities Scripts” (“Minzu guji Yanjiu”, China), “Studia Orientalia Slovaca” (University of Bratislava), etc.

== Awards ==
- 2013 – S. F. Oldenburg Prize of the Government of St. Petersburg and the St. Petersburg Scientific Center of the Russian Academy of Sciences for outstanding results in the field of the study of written heritage of China and Central Asia.
- 2016 – Honorary rank "Yangzi Scholar" 长江 学者 [8] of the Ministry of Education of the PRC for achievements in the study of ancient and medieval history of China.
- 2017 - Medal "Friendship" of the Government of Mongolia.
- 2018 - Medal of the Order for Merit to the Republic of Tatarstan.

== Major works ==
1. Попова И. Ф. [Popova I. F.]. Политическая практика и идеология раннетанского Китая [Political Practice and Ideology of Early Tang China]. Moscow, Vostochnaya Literatura Publishers, 1999, 279 pp.; Review: V. S. Myasnikov. In: Problemy Dal’nego Vostoka (Problems of the Far East), 2001, No. 1, pp. 179–182.

2. Popova I. F. The Administrative and Legal Regulations of the Tang Emperors for the Frontier Territories. In: Central Asian Law: An Historical Overview. A Festschrift for The Ninetieth Birthday of Herbert Franke. Ed. by W. Johnson, I. F. Popova. Society for Asian Legal History, The Hall Center for the Humanities, The University of Kansas, Lawrence, Ks., 2004, рр. 41–54. 3. Цинский Пекин. Картины народной жизни (миньсухуа) [Beijing During the Qing Dynasty: Pictures of Folklife (Minsuhua)]. Introduction, translation from Chinese, commentaries by I. F. Popova. St. Petersburg, Slavia Publishers, 2009, 248 pp.; Reviews: T. A. Pang. In: Pis'mennye pamiatniki Vostoka (Written Monuments of the Orient), 1 (12), 2010, pp. 277–279; Walravens, Hartmut. In: Monumenta Serica. No. 59 (2011), рр. 586–588.

4. Dunhuang Studies: Prospects and Problems for the Coming Second Century of Research / 敦煌學:第二個百年的研究視角與問題 / Дуньхуановедение: перспективы и проблемы второго столетия исследований. Ed. by I. Popova and Liu Yi. St. Petersburg, Slavia Publishers, 2012, 367 pp.; Review: 榮新江 Rong Xinjiang. 俄羅斯的敦煌學 --- 評《敦煌學：第二個百年的研究視角與問題》及其他 [Dunhuang Studies in Russia. On the Book ‘Dunhuang Studies: Prospects and Problems for the Coming Second Century of Research’ : and others. In: 敦煌吐魯番研究 [Journal of the Dunhuang and Turfan Studies]. No. XIII (2013), pp. 563–578 (in Chinese).

5. Тангуты в Центральной Азии [Tanguts in Central Asia: Collected Work in Honor of the 80th Anniversary of Prof. E. I. Kychanov]. Ed. by I. F. Popova. Moscow, Vostochnaya Literatura Publishers, 2012, 501 pp.[12]

6. История Китая с древнейших времен до начала XXI века [The History of China from Ancient Times to the Beginning of the 21st century] in 10 volumes. Ed. by S. L. Tikhvinskyi: vol. III: Троецарствие, Цзинь, Южные и Северные династии, Суй, Тан (220–907) [Three Kingdoms, Jin, Southern and Northern Dynasties, Sui, Tang (220–907)]. Ed. by I. F. Popova, M. E. Kravtsova. Moscow, Nauka - Vostochnaya Literatura Publishers, 2014, 991 pp., ISBN 978-5-02-036565-0.

7. История Китая с древнейших времен до начала XXI века [The History of China from Ancient Times to the Beginning of the 21st century] in 10 volumes. Ed. by S. L. Tikhvinsky: vol. IV. Период Пяти династий, империя Сун, государства Ляо, Цзинь, Си Ся (907–1279) [The Period of the Five Dynasties, the Song Empire, the States of Liao, Jin, Xi Xia (907–1279)]. Ed. by I. F. Popova. Moscow, Nauka –Vostochnaya Literatura Publishers, 2016, 942 pp.: ISBN 978-5-02-039761-3.

8. Словари кяхтинского пиджина [Vocabularies of Kyakhta Pidgin]. Translation from Chinese, publication, transcription, research and annexes by I. F. Popova and Takata Tokio. Moscow: Nauka - Vostochnaya Literatura Publishers, 2017. 603 pp. + facsimile. (Pamiatniki pismennosti Vostoka [Written Monuments in the Oriental Scripts] CL.): ISBN 978-5-02-036552-0.

9. Попова И. Ф. [Popova I. F.]. Жемчужины китайских коллекций Института восточных рукописей РАН/ Pearls from the Chinese Collections of the Institute of Oriental Manuscripts, RAS. St. Petersburg: Kvarta Publishers, 2018: ISBN 978-5-89609-531-6.

10. Азиатcкий Музей – Институт восточных рукописей РАН. Путеводитель [Asiatic Museum – Institute of Oriental Manuscripts, RAS. Collections and Personalia. Moscow: Nauka – Vostochnaya Literatura Publishers, 2018.

11. Попова И.Ф., Абдухаликов Ф.Ф. Культурное наследие Узбекистана в собраниях мира. Собрание Института восточных рукописей РАН 2020 ISBN 978-9943-4865-5-3
