= 1988 Library of the USSR Academy of Sciences fire =

Fire in the Library of the Russian Academy of Sciences in Saint Petersburg, Russia

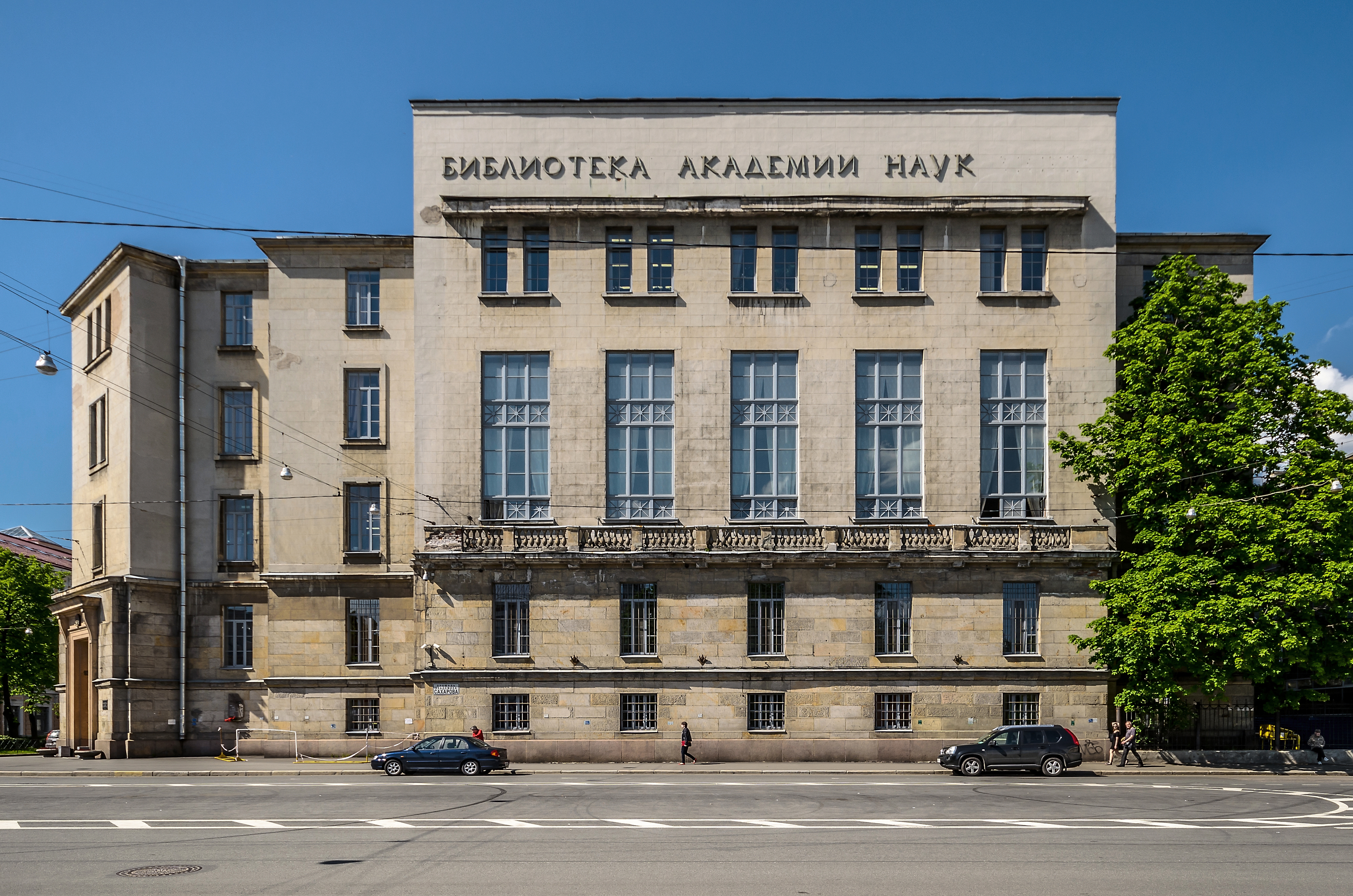
- The library in 2015
- Date: February 14, 1988
- Location: Leningrad (now Saint Petersburg); 59.944°N 30.297°E
- Deaths: none

The 1988 fire in the Library of the USSR Academy of Sciences (now Library of the Russian Academy of Sciences) broke out on Sunday, February 14, 1988, in the newspaper section on the third floor of the library; the cause of which is still unknown. According to the library's acting director Valeriy Leonov, the fire alarm sounded at 8:13 pm, when the library was closed for visitors. By the time the fire was extinguished the following afternoon, it had destroyed 298,000 books of the total 12 million housed, two to three million more were damaged by heat and smoke. About 734,465 copies volumes initially became damp due to firefighting foam. Many of the lost volumes were part of the Baer Collection of foreign scientific works: 152,000 were lost. The rest 146,000 were Russian books.

The lost fund was partially restored, large batches of books and individual rare editions came from more than 700 domestic libraries to replenish the lost funds.

Many of the lost books were foreign scientific works.

== Extinguishment ==
The first fire engines arrived eight minutes after the fire alarm went off. However, it took nearly two hours for the firefighters to reach the fire itself. The fire was initially tackled by the Ninth Fire Company that was joined by the crews of seven other fire engines.

== Book salvage ==
The damp books damaged by fire extinguishment were initially frozen. Then a radio appeal was broadcast for citizens to dry the damp books in their homes. By late March 1988 93% of the damp books had been dried in that way and returned to the library. However, about 10,000 books became moldy.
