= Christian Martin Frähn =

German-Russian numismatist and historian (1782–1851)

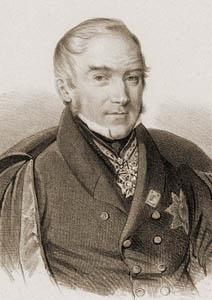
Christian Martin Frähn

Christian Martin Joachim (von) Frähn (4 June 1782 – 16 August 1851) was a German and Russian numismatist and Orientalist. He moved to the Russian Empire from his home town of Rostock in 1807 and spent the rest of his life there.

== Life and achievements ==
Frähn began his Oriental studies under Tychsen at the university of Rostock, and afterwards continued them at Göttingen and Tübingen. He became a Latin master in Pestalozzi's famous institute in 1804.

Frähn built on Tychsen’s work, advancing the study of Islamic coinage. His research on medieval Oriental coins — many from his own extensive collection — led him to explore their minting locations, the chronological order of dynasties, rulers’ titles, and more. Gradually, his work expanded to encompass nearly the entire field of Muslim antiquities.

Frähn was teaching at Rostock as a Privatdozent (from 1806), when he was chosen to fill the chair of Oriental languages in the Russian university of Kazan (1807). He was invited to succeed Tychsen at Rostock in 1815, but preferred to go to St Petersburg, where he founded the Asiatic Museum of the Academy of Sciences and led it until 1842. He died at St Petersburg and was laid to rest at the Smolensker Friedhof.

Frähn is appreciated in Russia for his pioneering use of Arabic sources to study the history of Early Rus, Volga Bulgaria, and neighbouring peoples.

== Works ==
Frähn wrote over 150 works. Among the more important are:

- Numophylacium orientale Pototianum (1813)
- De numorum Bulgharicorum fonte antiquissimo (1816)
- Das muhammedanische Münzkabinett des asiatischen Museum der kaiserl. Akademie der Wissenschaften zu St Petersburg (1821)
- Numi cufici ex variis museis selecti (1823)
- Notice d'une centaine d'ouvrages arabes, &c., qui manquent en grande partie aux bibliothèques de l'Europe (1834)
- Nova supplementa ad recensionem Num. Muham. Acad. Imp. Sci. Petropolitanae (1855)

Frähn's description of some medals struck by the Samanid and Buyid rulers (1804) was composed in Arabic because he had no Latin types.

Frähn had vivid correspondence with other academics. Among them also Samuel Gottlieb Rudolph Henzi, professor in Dorpat.
