= Rudolph Henzi =

Swiss linguist and theologian

Samuel Gottlieb Rudolf Henzi
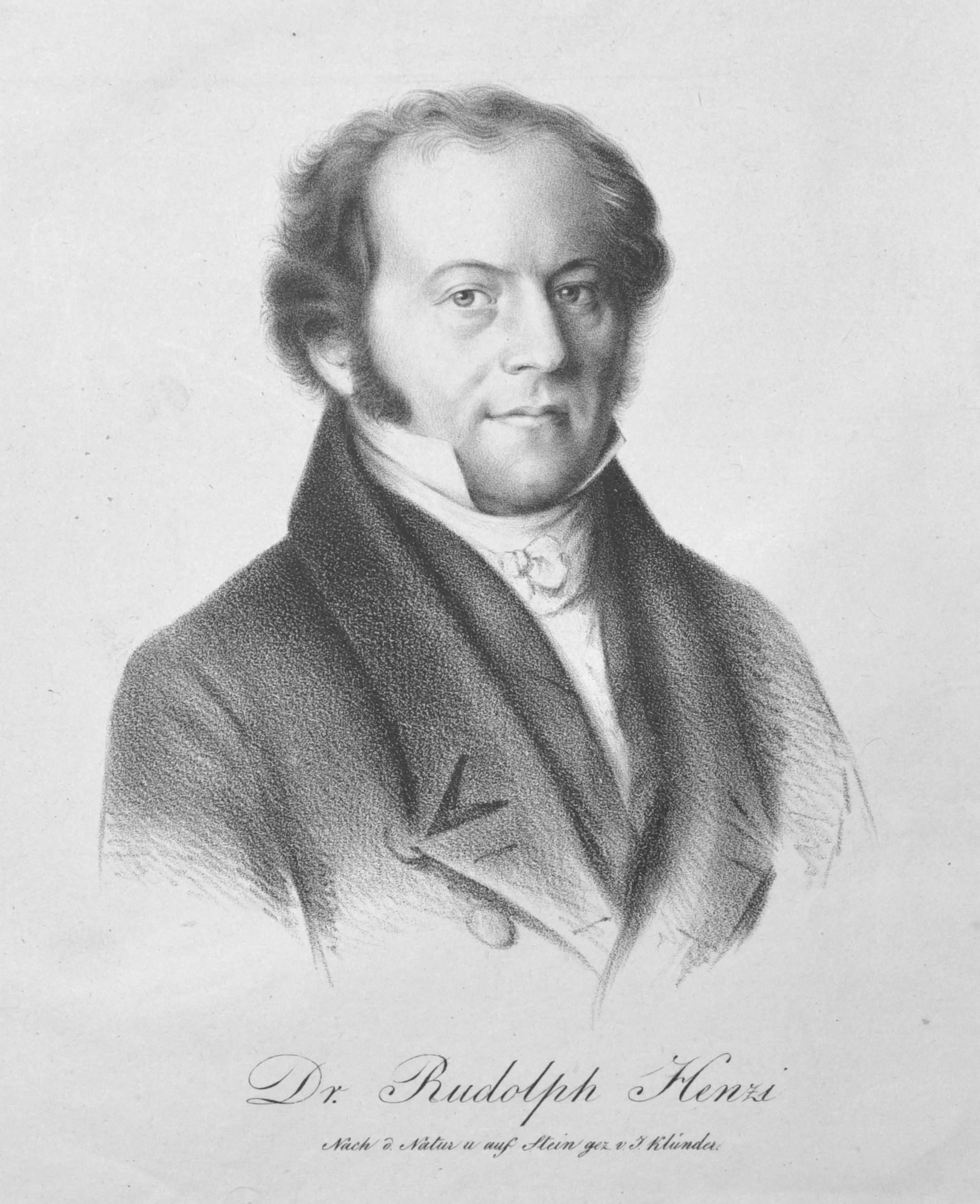
- Dr. Rudolph Henzi, Portrait, 1829.
- Born: 7 September 1794; Bern, Switzerland
- Died: 1 February [O.S. 13 January] 1829 (aged 34); Tartu, Russian Empire
- Education: University of Berne
- Scientific career
- Fields: Linguistics, theology
- Workplaces: University of Tartu

Samuel Gottlieb Rudolph Henzi (7 September 1794 – 1 February [O.S. 13 January] 1829), was a Swiss linguist, professor at the University of Tartu (at the time: Dorpat) on the chair of exegetics and Oriental languages, the dean of the theological faculty; head of the Tartu Branch of Russian Bible Society.

== Biography ==
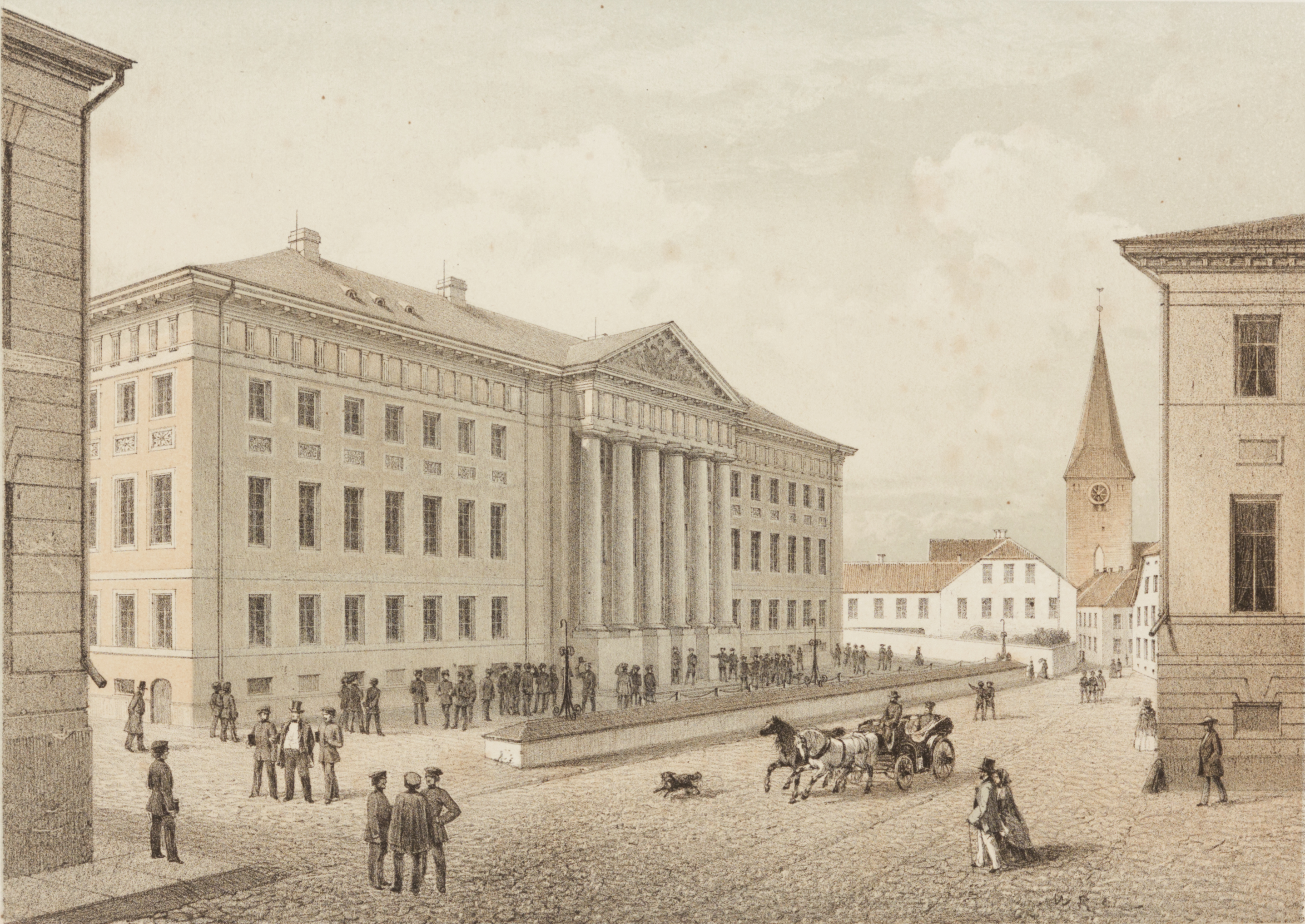
Tartu University, 1860.

Henzi was born on 7 September 1794 in Bern, Switzerland, where he received his primary and university education. During his stay at the University of Bern, he spent three years studying philosophy, then theology.

In 1816, according to the Swiss custom of ordination, he was accepted as a candidate for church duties, after which he studied theology in Tübingen for another year, and from 1817 to 1818 studied the history in Göttingen. Upon his return, he was appointed vicar in Unterseen, but in the fall of 1818 he resigned his post and, wishing to fill his knowledge of the Eastern languages, went to Paris, where he studied Arabic, Persian and Sanskrit languages under Sylvestre de Sacy.

After spending some time in Great Britain, Henzi returned to his homeland in the summer of 1819, wishing to devote himself to academic activity. At this time, the Department of Exegesis and Oriental Languages was inaugurated at the University of Tartu, where he was elected to the University Council, and on 5 March 1820, he was appointed Ordinary Professor. Even before his departure, Henzi received a degree as a Doctor of Theology at University of Tübingen for processing part of the still unreleased Arabic commentary of Al-Baydawi on the Quran.

On 30 August 1820, he delivered an introductory lecture: "Über Verhältniss der Schriften des Alten und Neuen Testaments zu einander nach Inhalt und Form". In addition to lectures on Exegesis, he also gave lectures on Eastern languages, led practical exercises on Exegesis in the theological seminary, and during the 1822–1823 academic year Henzi temporarily supervised practical classes "on the Gospel pericopam".

In 1821, he became director of the Tartu Branch of the Russian Bible Society, and in 1822, a member of the school commission. He was elected dean of the theological faculty four times.

Henzi died on 1 February 1829 in Tartu.

Also in 1829, he is said to have been ennobled by Nicholas I of Russia.

For the funeral, Gottlieb Eduard Lenz wrote an Oratio Funebris in German and Latin, which is held at the National Library of Estonia.

== Family ==
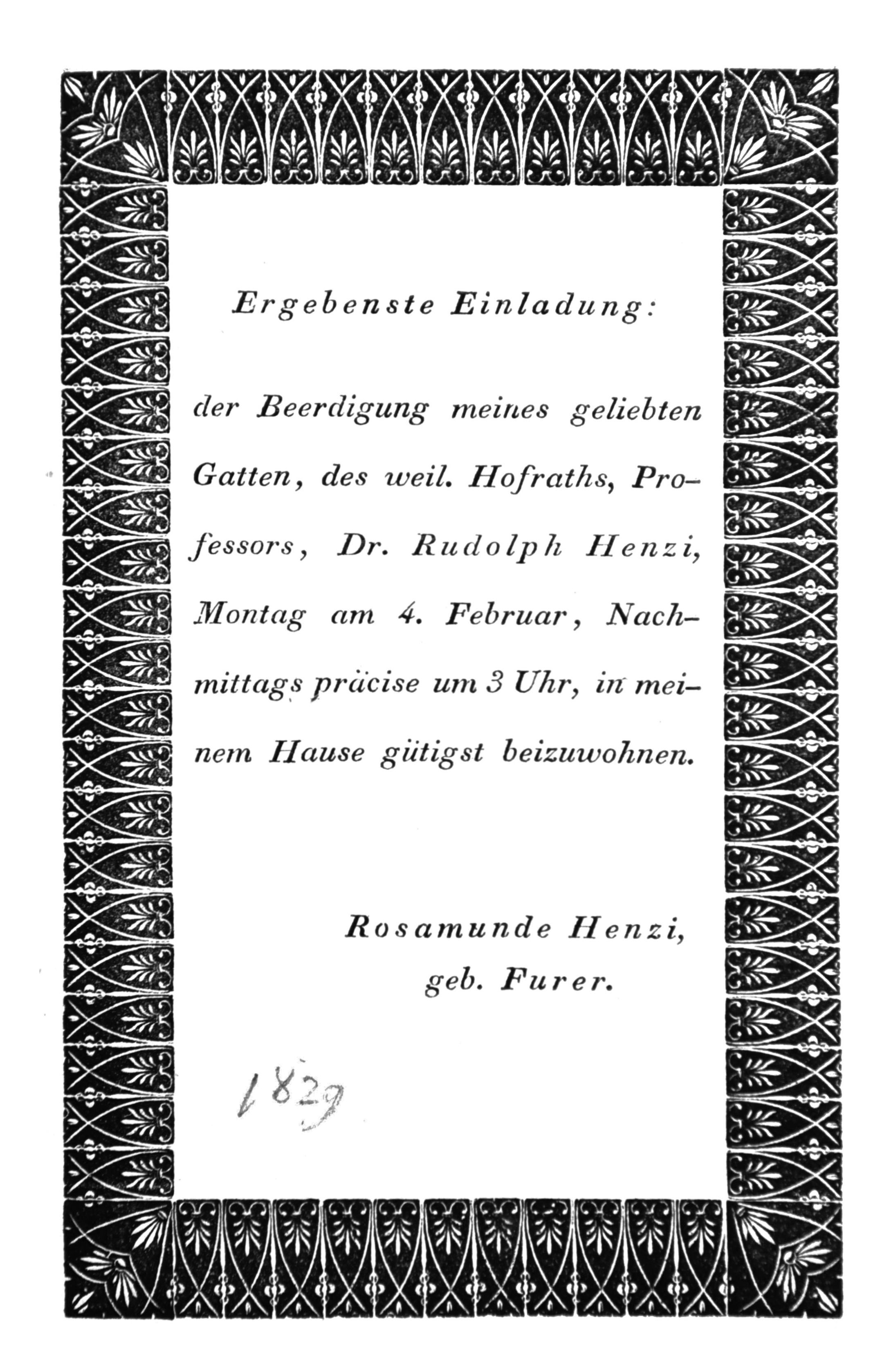
Invitation to the funeral of Dr. Rudolph Henzi, 4 February 1829.

Henzi was the son of a very rich commerciant, Rudolph Jakob Henzi, of Bern.

Henzi married Margaretha Adriana Rosamunde Furer on 31 July 1821 in Tartu. Their son, Samuel Rudolf Henzi, was born on 8 December 1822 in Tartu (or 26 November 1822 in Bern), and studied medicine in Saint Petersburg, Tartu and Bern.

Henzi was buried on 4 February 1829 in Tartu Vana-Jaani cemetery in plot XXXIII, field 1527, grave 5. The gravestone has since gotten removed, presumably by the Soviets, who did not like this "German graveyard", and cleared the whole plot XXXIII.

== Selected bibliography ==
=== Books ===
- D. R. Henzi: Fragmenta Arabica, e codicibus manuscriptis parisinis nunc primum, publicis sumtibus. University of Dorpat, St. Peterburg, 1828, (printed at the expense of the university). (Google books)
- Rudolphus Henzi, D. (execeticae et linguarum orientalium P.P.O): Ad audiendam orationem in auditorio maximo d. 6. Dec. habendam qua diem Nicolai I. imperatoris et domini nostri longe clementissimi sancto nomini dicatum concelebrabit Universitas Literarum Dorpatensis. Dorpat. 1827. (Google Books)
- Dr. Rud. Henzi: Predigt ueber Roem. I, 16., preaching hold in Dorpat on 7 Nov., printed by J. C. Schünmann, Universitätsbuchdrucker, Tartu, 1821.

=== Chapters ===
- Abriss einer Grammatik und Wörterverzeichniss der Hawai-oder Sandwichsprache ("Hertha, Zeitschr. F. Erde-, Völker- und Staatenkunde", 1826, published by H. Berghaus and V. Hoffmann with A. v Humboldt in Stuttgart and Tübingen, II, 76–120). (archive.org, PDF pages 520–562)

=== Arhive ===
- Doctoral dissertation and manuscripts, proof sheets of R. Henz's Arabic reading with corrections, notes and letters of the orientalist Chr. M. J. Frähn. (University of Tartu digital archive)

=== Unknown ===
- Progr. Libri Ecclesiastae argumenti brevis adnumeratio. Tartu, 1827.

== Lectures ==
During his time at Tartu University, Henzi was carrying out research and also holding lectures. The names of the lectures can be found in the "Intelligenzblatt der Jenaischen allgemeinen Literatur-Zeitung" (in English: "Intellectual journal of the general literature newspaper of Jena"). Sometime his name is given as "Rudolph" and sometimes as "Rudolf".

1820 November

- Die erste Hälfte der synoptischen Erklärung der 3 ersten Evangelien
- Exegetische Erklärung der Genesis
- Elemente der Arabischen Sprache

1821 July

- Erklärung des Briefes an die Römer und des ersten Briefes an die Korinther
- Erklärung der Messianischen Weissagungen auf welche das Neue Testament sich beruft
- Arabische Sprache
- Theologisches Seminarium: exegetische und katechetische Übungen

1822 November

- Das Evangelium des Johannis
- Auserlesene Stücke des Propheten Jesaias
- Hebräische Sprache (nach Gesenius' hebräischer Grammatik, 5. Auflage, Halle 1822)
- Theologisches Seminarium: katechetische Übungen über die evangelischen Perikopen, sowie latienische Disputirübungen über exegetische Streitfragen

1824 July

- Evangelium Epistolasque Ioannis explicabt *Salomonis Proverbia, inde a capite XVIII, nec non Ecclesiastea interpretabitur
- Hebraicam linguam docebit secundum Gesenii Elementa
- Arabicam linguam addiscere studiosos instituet
- In Seminario Theologico et commentationibus catecheticis in Pericopas avangelicas habendis praeerit, et Latine de rebus exegeticis scribendo et disputando exercebit

Additionally, to what normally he is teaching in Scholae theologorum, this time he is also teaching in Instituta Publica together with Lenz:

- In Seminario theologico R. Henzi, h.t. Director, una cum Professore Theologiae practicae, Th. E. Lenz (Gottlieb Eduard Lenz), exercitationes practicas supra memoratas instituet et moderabitur

1826 Dezember

- Erste Hälfte der synoptischen Erklärung der drey ersten Evangelien
- Erklärung des ersten buches der Psalmen
- Elemente der hebräischen Sprache (nach Gesenius' hebräischem Elementarbuch)
- Erlernen der arabischen Sprache

1828 January – June

- Evangelium atque Epistolas Ioannis
- Oracula, in libro Iesaiae inde a cap. XL. contenta
- Linugae Arabicae addiscendae studiosos instituet, fragmentis Arabicis quibusdam, a se editis

1828 Dezember

- Erklärung des Briefes an die Römer und des einen oder anderen der kleinen Paulinischen Briefe (Epistolam Pauli ad Romanos explicabit )
- Auslegung der Genesis (Genesia interpretabitur)
- Erlernen der arabischen Sprache mit Benutzung der "Arabischen Fragmente" (linguae Arabicae addiscendae studiosos instituet, fragmentis Arabicis quibusdam, a se editis)
- Theologisches Seminarium: exegetische Übungen (Exercitationes Seminarii theologici sodalium exegeticas moderabitur)

== Gallery ==
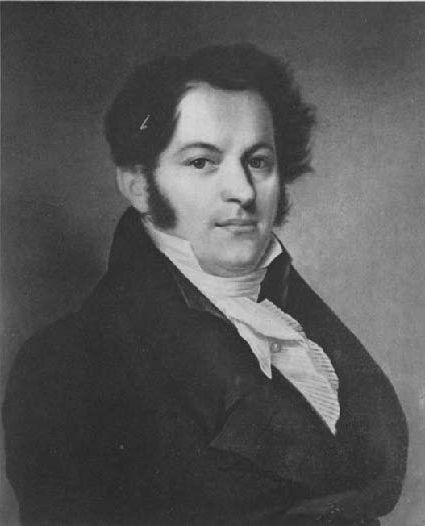
During a holiday in Bern, 1827.

== Literature ==
- Sylvestre de Sacy: (Commentary on Henzi's work). In: Journal des Savans, juillet 1829, p 410–421, (Google Books)
- Martin Hallik, Olaf-Mihkel Klaassen, Unustatud orientalist professor Samuel Gottlieb Rudolf Henzi (engl. Forgotten Oriental Professor Samuel Gottlieb Rudolf Henzi). – "Ajalooline Ajakiri" (engl. Historical Magazine) 1999: 2, p. 31-36. University of Tartu DSpace Repository (pdf)
- Russian Biographical Dictionary (РБС/ВТ/Генци, Самуил-Готтлиб-Рудольф) (Wikisource, in Russian)
- "Генци Самуил Готлиб-Рудольф" in Axel Frey (Ed.): Biographischer Index Rußlands und der Sowjetunion, German/Russian, K.G.Saur, München 2005. (P. 2672 on Google Books)
- Heinrich Seesemann: Professor Dr. Rudolf Henzi (1794–1829) und Dorpat im 3. Jahrzehnt des 19. Jhds. In: Jahrbuch des baltischen Deutschtums 1986, p. 43-59.
- Hans Henzi: Zwei Bernerinnen fahren nach Livland und Begegnen Albert Bitzius. In: Jahrbuch Oberaargau 1969, 1969, pages 62–68 (in German). (pdf)
- Tartu University Library: Biography and Bibliography on Henzi, Rudolf, 2003 by T. Šahhovskaja (in Estonian). (pdf)
- Henzi, Samuel Gottlieb Rudolf. In: Baltisches Biographisches Lexikon digital (in German). Baltischen Historischen Kommission. Retrieved 16 September 2018. ()
