= Johannes Albrecht Bernhard Dorn =

German orientalist (1805–1881)

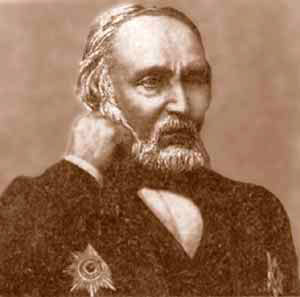
Bernhard Dorn (1805–1881)

Johannes Albrecht Bernhard Dorn (29 April 1805 in Scheuerfeld, Saxe-Coburg, Germany – 19 May 1881 in St. Petersburg, Russia), or Boris Andreevich Dorn, was a German orientalist. He specialized in the history and the languages of Iran, Russia and Afghanistan.

== Biography ==
He studied theology and philology at the universities of Halle and Leipzig, obtaining his habilitation in 1825. At Leipzig University Dorn worked for a while as a lecturer. Later on, he served as a professor of oriental languages at Kharkov University (1829–35), then in 1835 relocated to St. Petersburg as a professor of history and geography in the Asiatic department of the Russian Ministry of foreign affairs. He taught Sanskrit and Pashtu at St. Petersburg University.

In 1839 he became an adjunct at the Russian Academy of Sciences, where he eventually attained the level of academician in 1852. He was appointed director of the Asiatic Museum in 1842, and director of the Ethnographic Museum in 1855.

Dorn wrote a book Über die Verwandtschaft des persischen, germanischen und griechisch-lateinischen Sprachstammes (1827), in which he argued in detail that the Persian language was related to Germanic, Greek, and Latin. This thesis would later be confirmed by the findings of Indo-European studies, although many of Dorn's supposed cognate pairs are mistaken.

== Literature ==
- Abaschnik, Vladimir Alekseevic, "Johann Albrecht Bernhard Dorn (1805–1881) aus Coburg als Professor der Orientalistik in Charkow und Sankt Petersburg," in Coburger Geschichtsblätter. Hg. von der Historischen Gesellschaft Coburg e.V. – 2004. – Heft 1–2 (Januar–Juni), S. 26–39.
- History of the Afghans : translated from the Persian of Neamet Ullah by Bernhard Dorn (1836).
- A chrestomathy of the Pushtū or Afghan language; with a subjoined glossary in Afghan and English, edited by Bernhard Dorn (1847).
