= Carl Salemann =

Russian scholar (1850–1916)

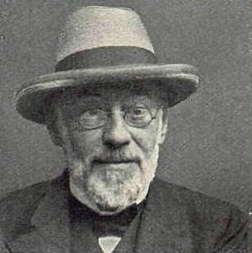
- Born: Tallinn
- Died: Saint Petersburg
- Alma mater: Faculty of Oriental Studies of the St. Petersburg University
- Occupation: Literary historian

Carl Hermann Salemann (Russian: Карл Германович Залеман, Karl Germanovitsh Zaleman; 9 January 1850 [O.S. 28 December 1849] — 13 December [O.S. 30 November] 1916) was a Russian Iranist scholar. He was an academician of Saint Petersburg Academy of Sciences (1895) and a director of Asiatic Museum of the Academy of Sciences (1890—1916).

== Biography ==
Salemann was a Baltic German, born in Revel (now Tallinn), on 9 January 1850 [O.S. 28 December 1849].

He studied at Oriental Faculty of Saint Petersburg Imperial University, Arabic-Persian-Turkish and the Sanskrit-Persian sections, in 1867–1871. He defended a thesis on the quatrains of Khaqani and obtained master's degree on Persion literature in 1875.

In 1875, he became an assistant university librarian, and in 1879, he was promoted to full librarian.

From 1876, Salemann taught Zend and Middle Persian literature on Oriental Faculty. He held a position of Privatdozent.

In 1882, he was elected a member of Imperial Russian Archaeological Society.

He was also elected an adjunct member of Saint Petersburg Academy of Sciences (specializing in Asiatic literature and history) in 1886, an extraordinary academician in 1890, an ordinary academician in 1895.

From 1890, he was a director of Asiatic Museum of the Academy of Sciences. In this position he collected manuscripts and books and published descriptions of newly acquired items, as well as prepared catalogues of the museum.

In 1890, he became a librarian of second section of the library of the Academy of Sciences.

In 1902, Salemann became an honorary professor of University of Giessen. In 1903, he became a member of the Russian committee for the Study of Central and Eastern Asia. In 1904, he became a corresponding member of the Hungarian Academy of Sciences. In 1908, he became an honorary member of the Royal Asiatic Society.

== Bibliography ==
Main works of Salemann:

- «Ueber eine Parsenhandschrift der K. Oeffentl. Bibliothek zu St. Petersburg» («Travaux de la 3-е session du Congrès international des Orientalistes», vol. II, Leiden, 1879);
- «Mittelpersische Studien» («Bulletin de l’Académie», 1886);
- «Scham-si-Fachrii lexicon Persicum» (Kazan, 1887);
- «Bericht über die Ausgabe des Mi’jar i Jamali» («Bulletin de l’Académie». 1888);
- «Persische Grammatik mit Litteratur, Chrestomathie und Glossar» (together with V. Zhukovsky, Leipzig., 1889);
- «Краткая грамматика новоперсидского языка, с приложением метрики и библиографии» (together with V. Zhukovsky, Saint Petersburg, 1890);
- «Noch einmal die Seldschukischen Verse» (1890, «Bulletin de l’Académie»).
