= Ferdinand Johann Wiedemann =

Estonian linguist and botanist (1805–1887)

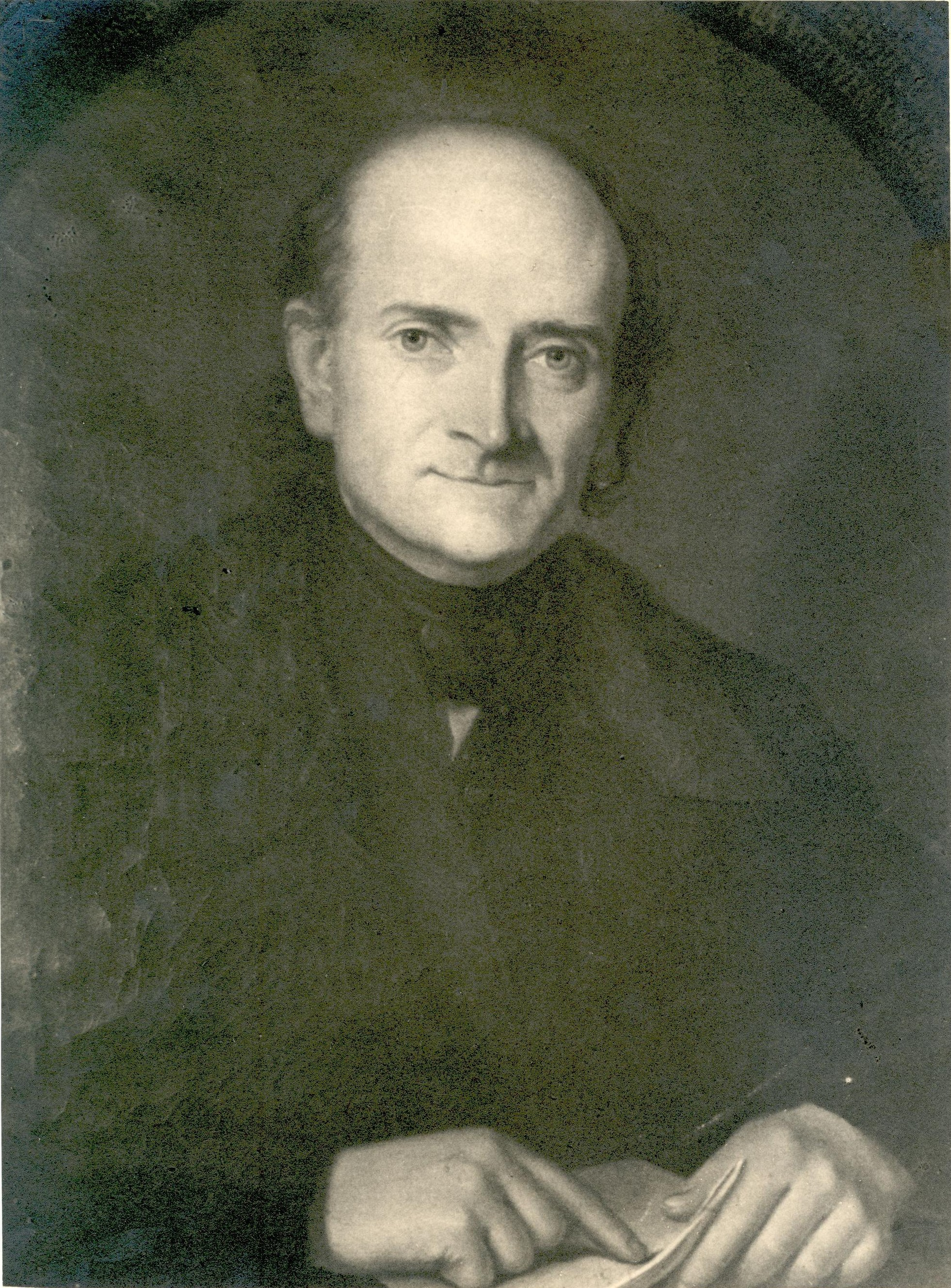
Ferdinand Johann Wiedemann

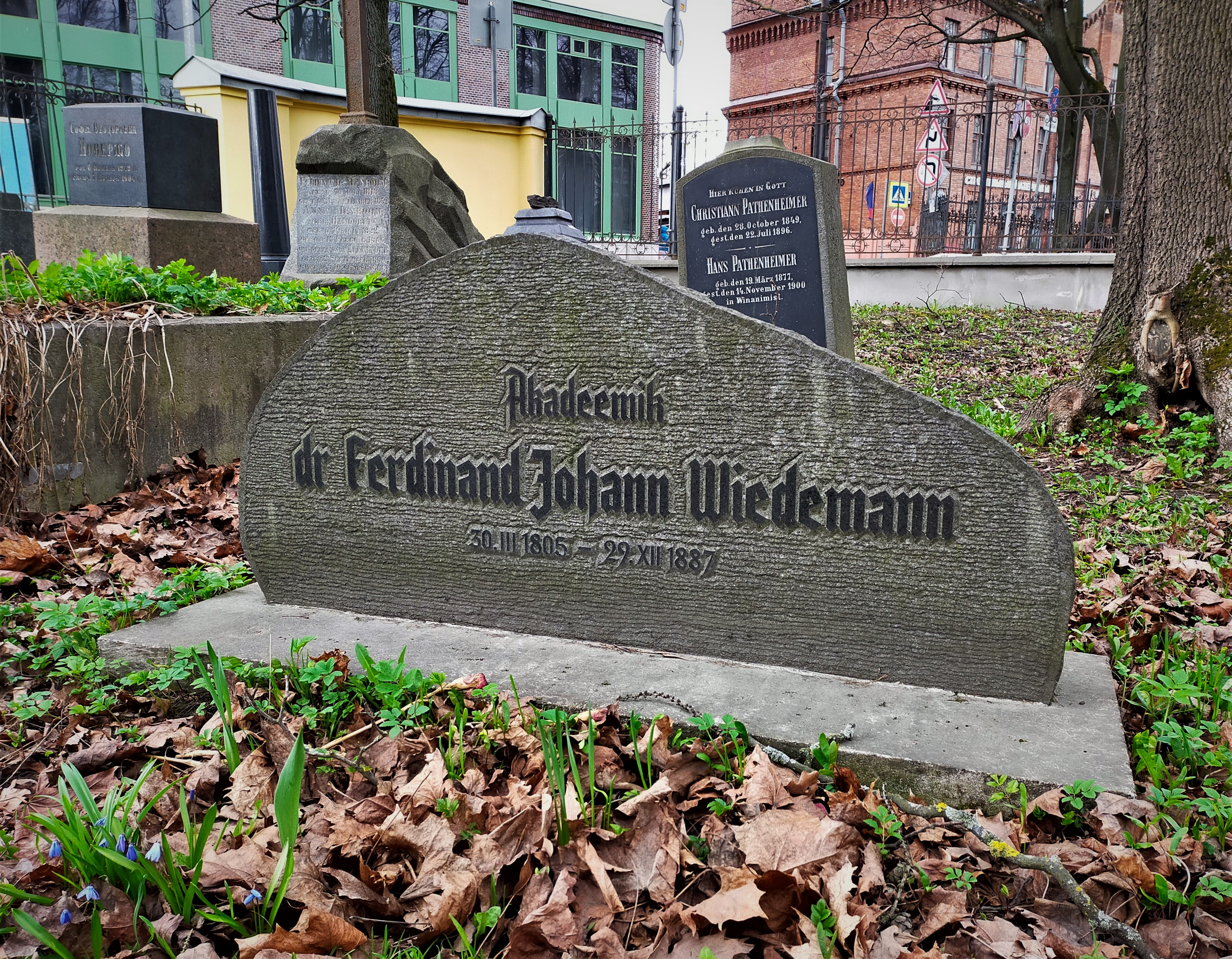
Wiedemann‘s grave, Smolensky Lutheran Cemetery

Ferdinand Johann Wiedemann (30 March [O.S. 18 March] 1805 in Hapsal (now Haapsalu) – 29 December [O.S. 17 December] 1887 in Saint Petersburg) was a linguist who researched Uralic languages, mostly Estonian. Wiedemann was also a botanist.

Wiedemann was of German-Swedish origin. In 1869 he published an Estonian-German dictionary (Ehstnisch-deutsches Wörterbuch), which was the richest dictionary of Estonian words for a long time.

== Sources ==
- "Видеман, Фердинанд Иванович" . Brockhaus and Efron Encyclopedic Dictionary (in Russian). 1906.
