= Elizabethan Baroque =

Russian architectural style

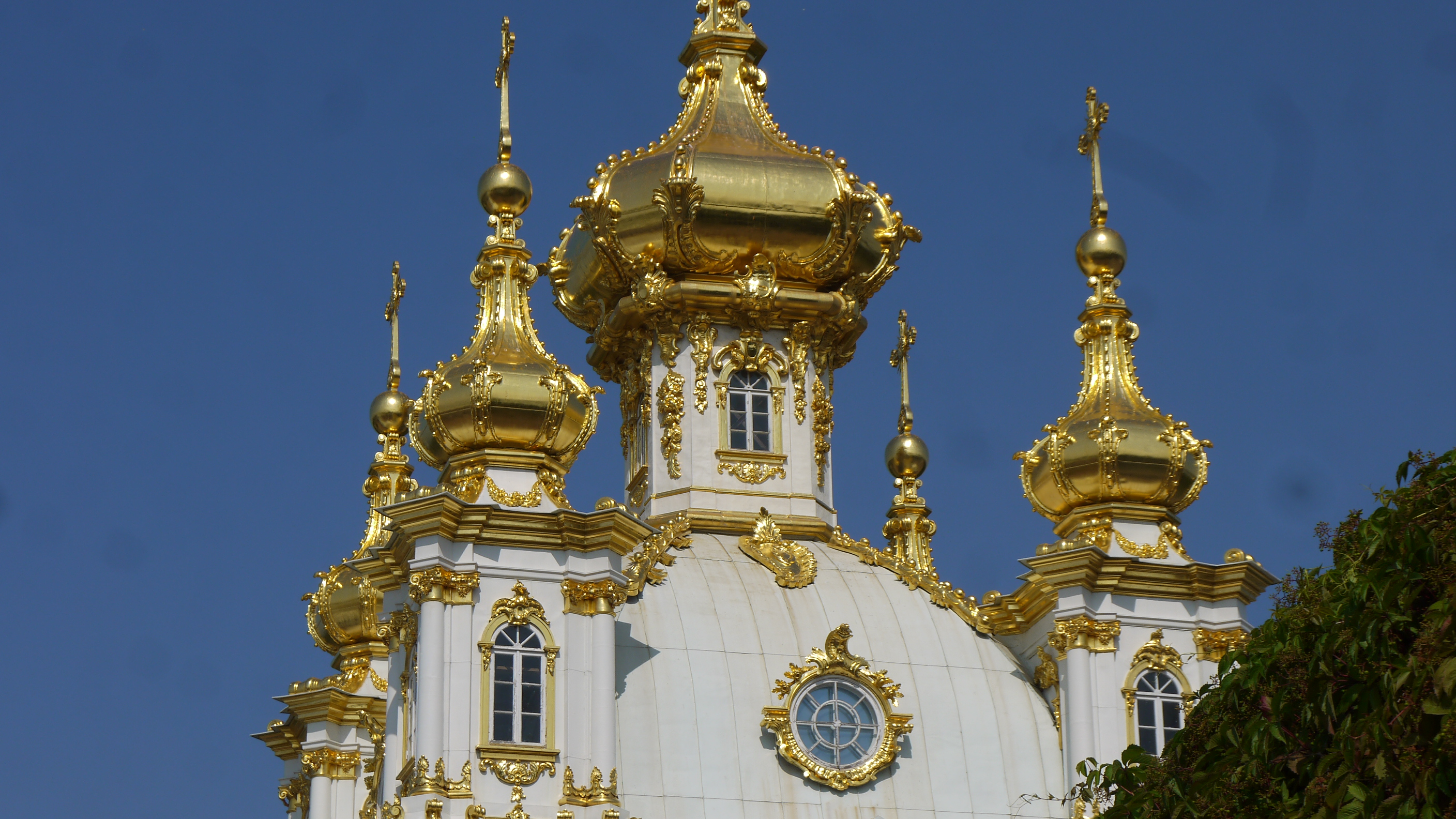
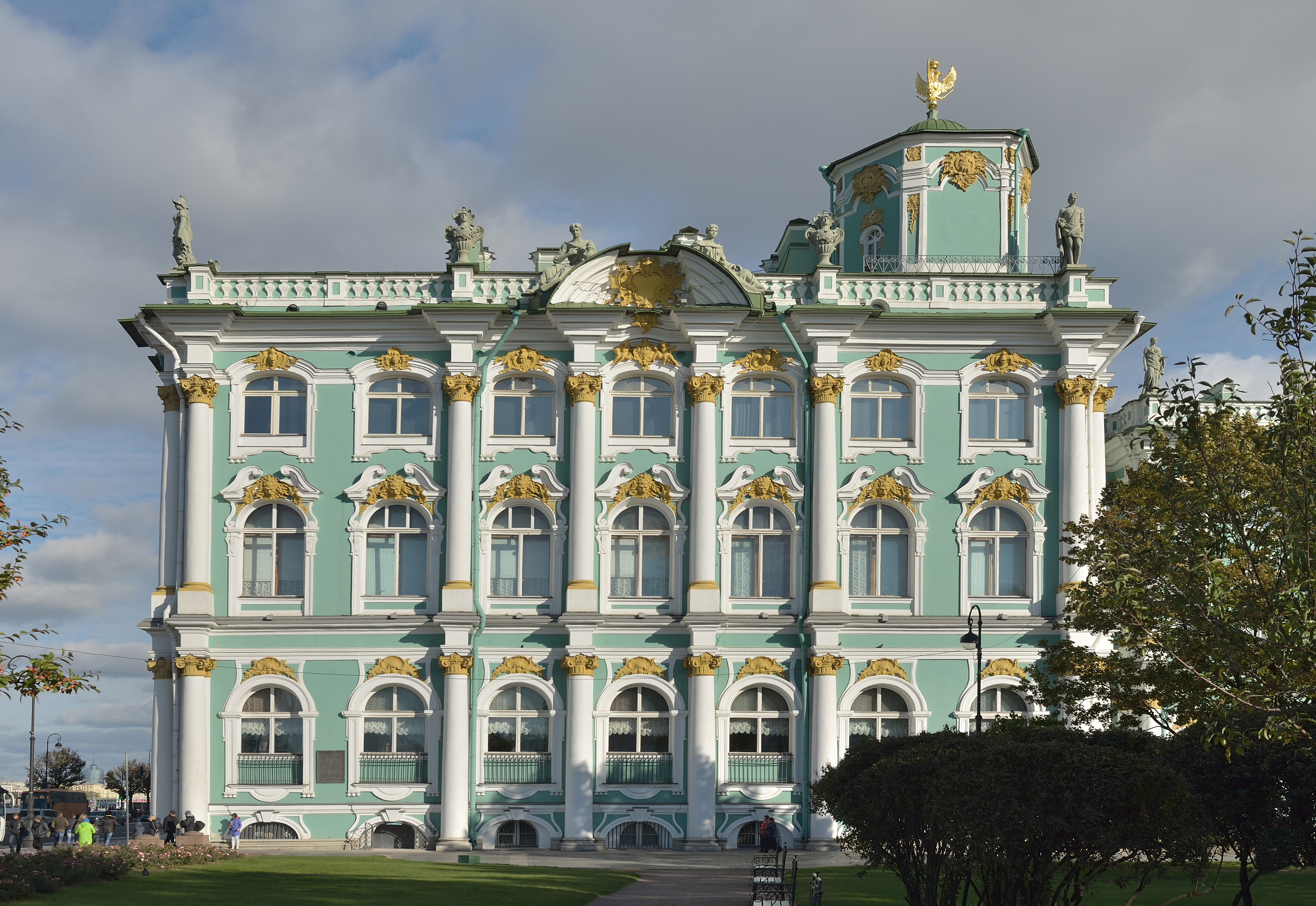
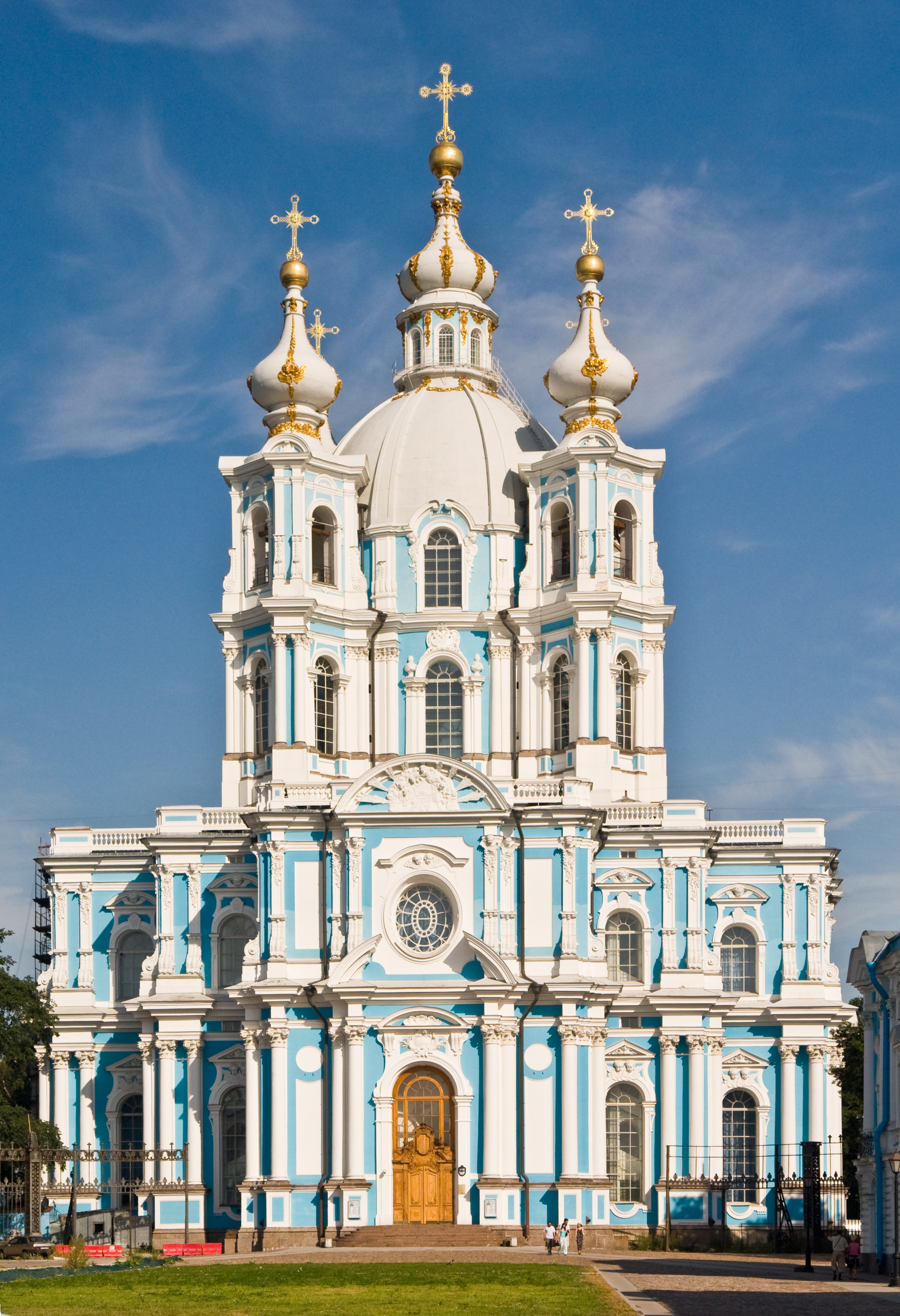
- Church of the Peterhof Palace; west façade of the Winter Palace; the Smolny Cathedral
- Years active: 18th century
- Location: Russian Empire; Duchy of Courland

Elizabethan Baroque (Russian: Елизаветинское барокко, romanized: Yelizavetinskoye barokko or Elizavetinskoe barokko) is a term for the Russian Baroque architectural style, developed during the reign of Elizabeth of Russia between 1741 and 1762. It is also called style Rocaille or Rococo style. The Italian architect Francesco Bartolomeo Rastrelli is the key figure of this trend, which is still given the name 'Rastrellian Baroque'. The Russian architect Savva Chevakinsky is also a renowned figure representing this style.

== Style ==
Unlike the former Russian Baroque styles such as Petrine Baroque, the Elizabethan Baroque tended to appreciate the Muscovite Baroque, and maintained the very essence of Russian architectural elements like the five cupolas shaped like onions.

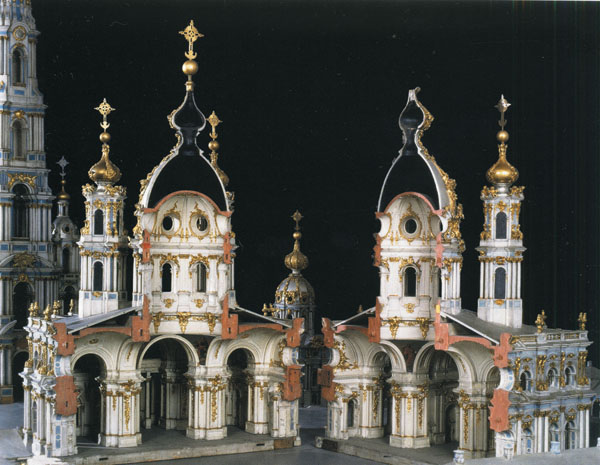
Model of the Smolny Cathedral

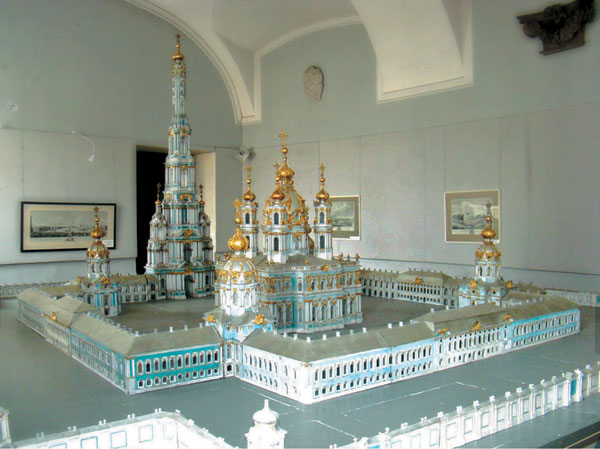
Model of the Smolny Convent

The Elizabethan Baroque tended to create the architecture of grandeur in order to glorify the might of the Russian Empire. Rastrelli designed majestic palace complexes in Saint Petersburg and its environs: the Winter Palace, the Catherine Palace, and the Peterhof Palace. These palaces are characterized by gigantic proportions, golden splendour decorations, the use of two or three shades of colour for their façades, the refinement added by their gilding, give these buildings a particular style. The festive character of Rastrelli's work left its mark on all the Russian architecture of the middle of the eighteenth century. His most spectacular work is the Smolny Convent in St. Petersburg, the model he had made demonstrates the ambition of the original project that was not completed: the immense pyramidal steeple was never built.

Rastrelli was influenced by the French architects Germain Boffrand and Robert de Cotte; the great architects of Central Europe, from Balthasar Neumann (Würzburg) to François de Cuvilliés (Munich), from Matthäus Daniel Pöppelmann (Dresden) to Fischer von Erlach (Vienna, Salzburg); the monasteries in Moscow; not to mention the reminiscences of Gian Lorenzo Bernini and Italian Baroque. He adapted the Italian Baroque taste to the immensity of the landscape of St. Petersburg, his art is made of an amalgam of all these styles, which he has managed to transcend into an original synthesis, more Russian than European.

Apart from some interiors, it is not quite correct to regard this style as Rococo; for example, the fronts of the Winter Palace by Rastrelli, with exuberant coloured stuccos marked by mighty colonnades and delicate window openings, possess the solidity of the mature Baroque rather than the curvilinear lightness of the Rococo.

The Elizabethan Baroque style is also found in the works of Muscovite architects of the mid-eighteenth century, particularly those of Dmitry Ukhtomsky and Ivan Fyodorovich Michurin. In St. Petersburg, with the empress Elizabeth Petrovna, a host of architects competed in the realisation of palaces: Fyodor Semenovich Argunov, Savva Chevakinsky, Andrey Kvasov, among others. The Swiss architect Pietro Antonio Trezzini was the specialist in the field of religious buildings. With the exception of some constructions by Andrey Kvasov, Antonio Rinaldi, Johann Gottfried Schädel and Rastrelli's Saint Andrew's Church in Kyiv, the style is rarely seen in Ukraine.

After the death of the empress Elizabeth Petrovna, the construction orders were passed to Antonio Rinaldi, who had previously worked for the small courtyard of the Oranienbaum Palace. He refused to imitate the grandiose achievements of Rastrelli and introduced the Rococo style into the architecture of the court. In the years following 1760, Rinaldi, like other renowned architects, abandoned the Baroque style and turned to the aesthetics of Classicism.

== Gallery ==
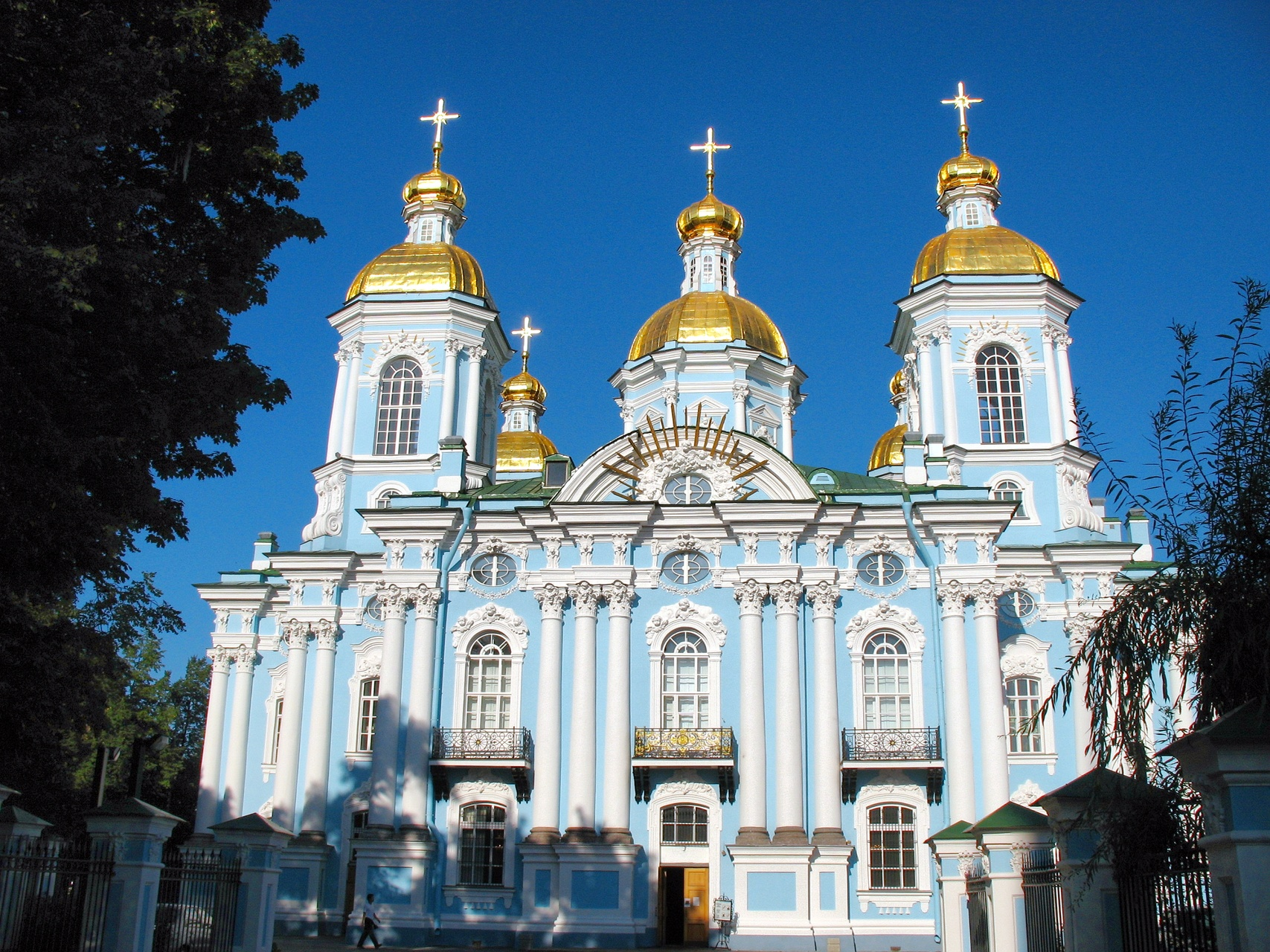
St. Nicholas Naval Cathedral

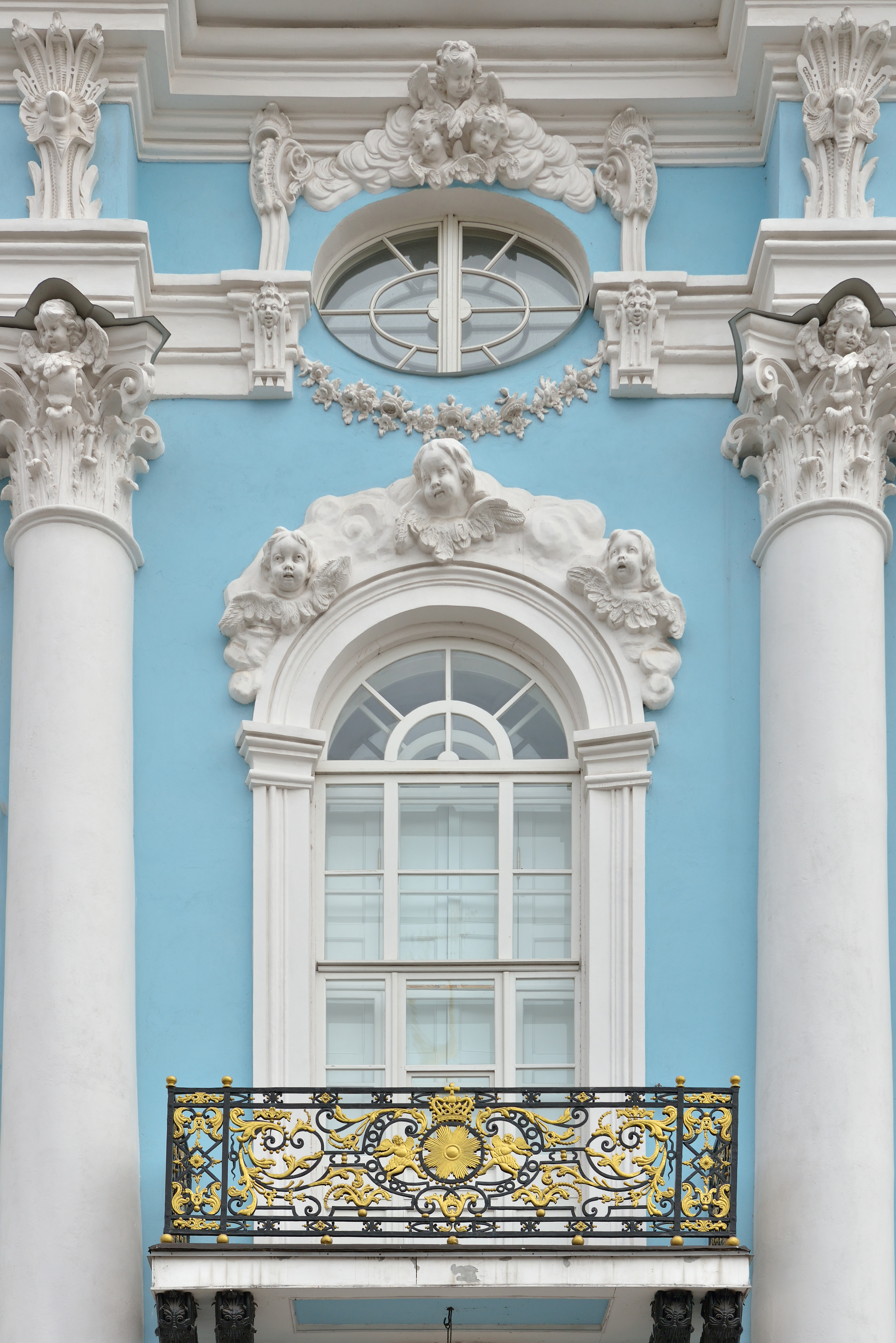
Detail of St. Nicholas Naval Cathedral

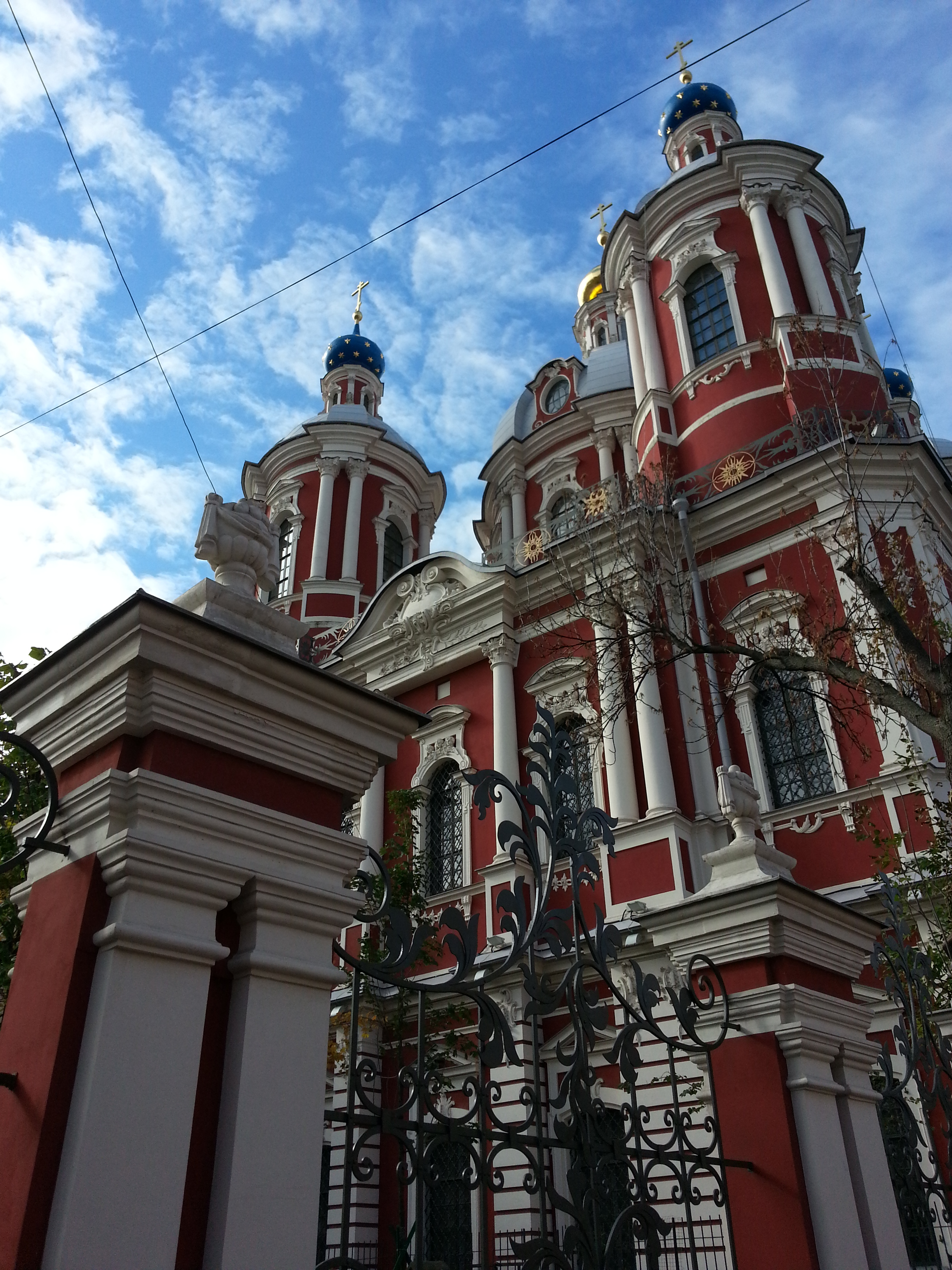
St Clement's Church, Moscow

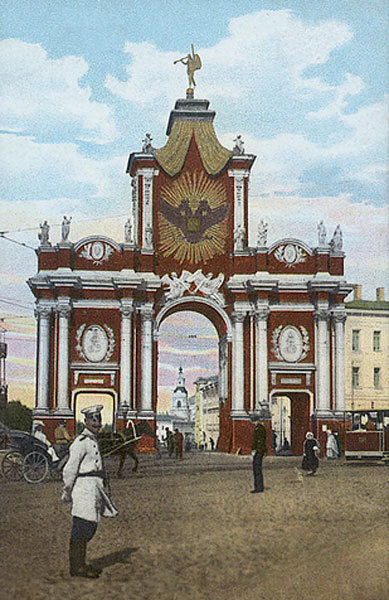
Red Gate in Moscow

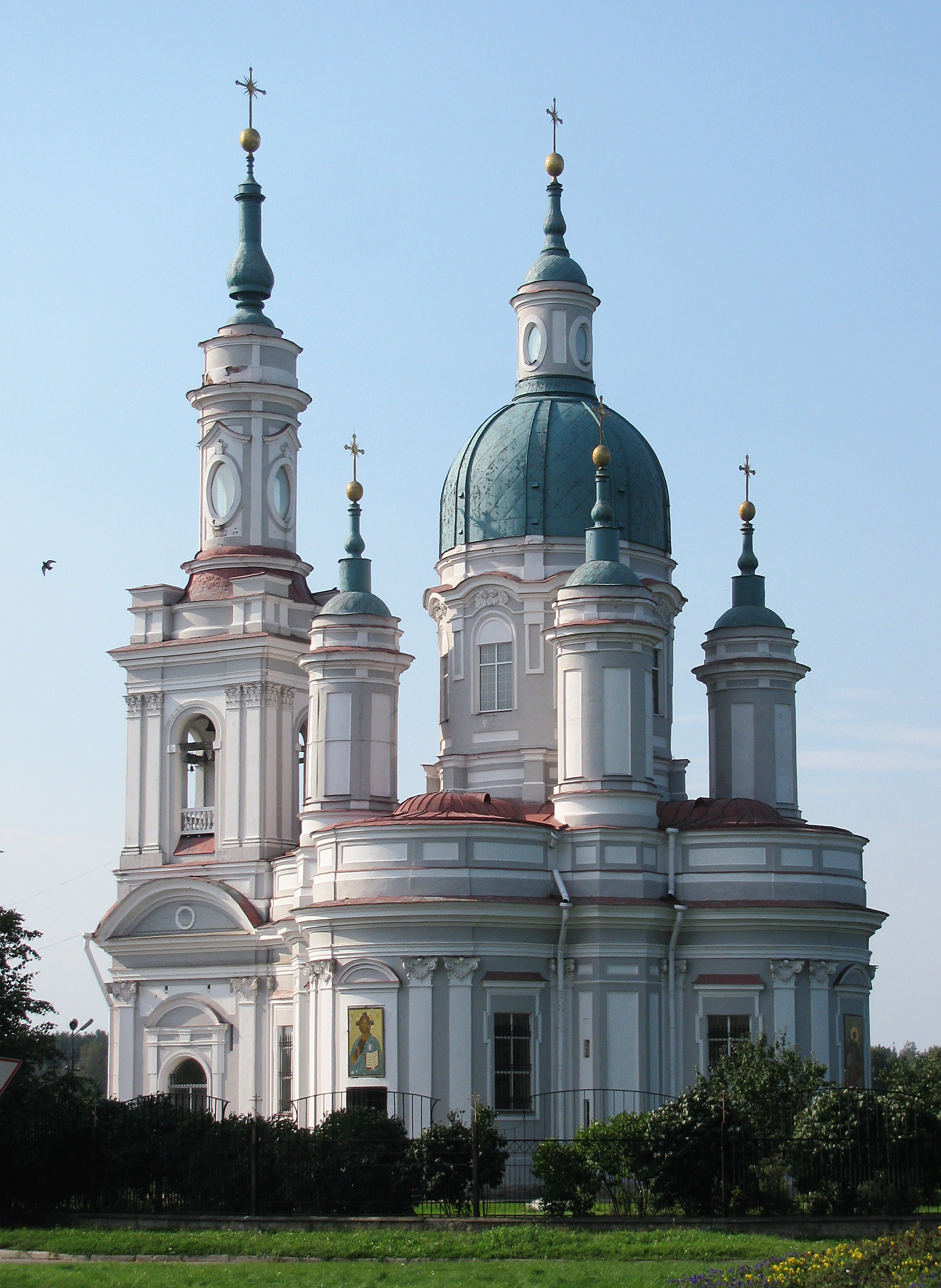
St. Catherine Cathedral, Kingisepp

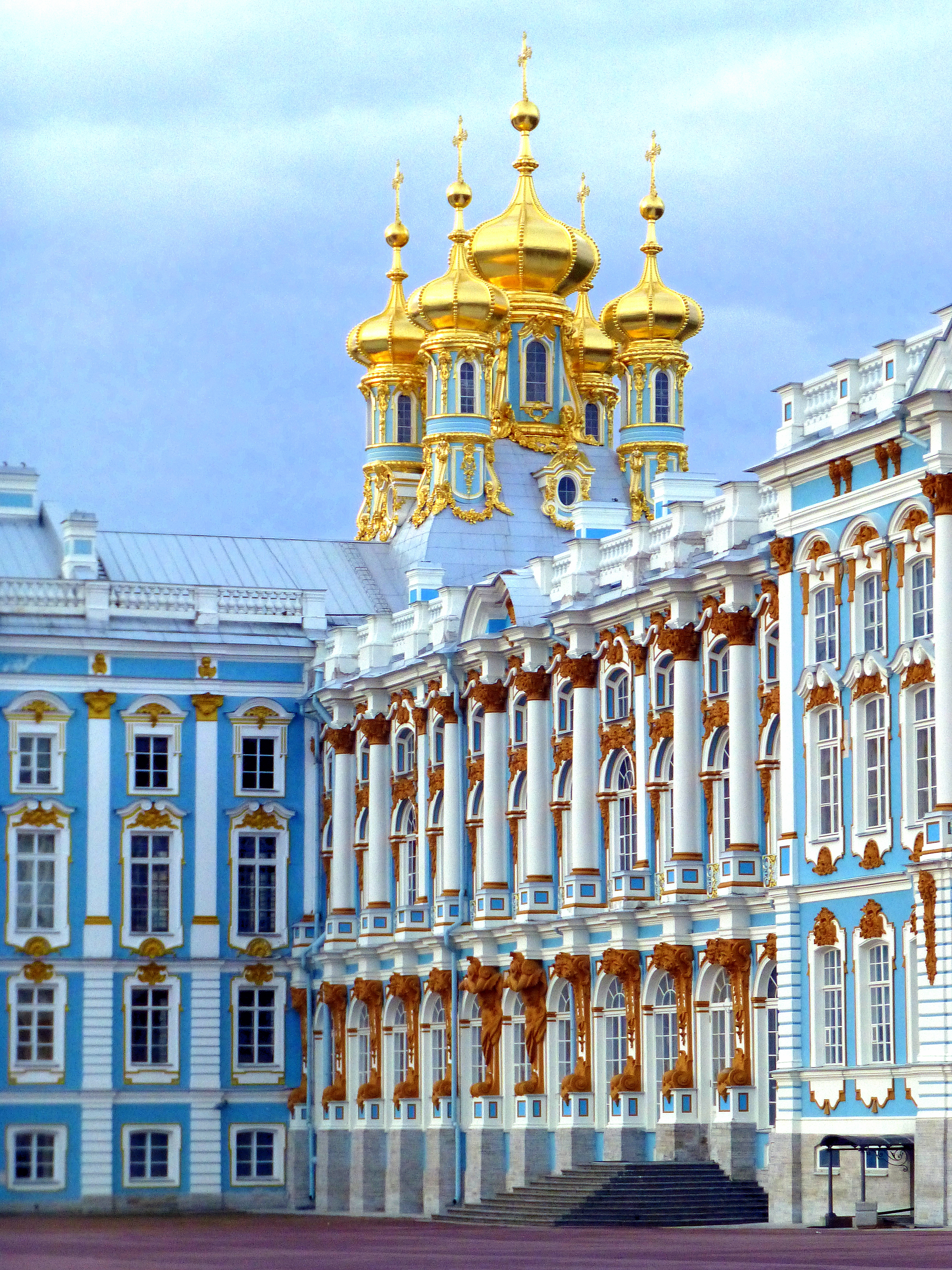
West façade of the Catherine Palace

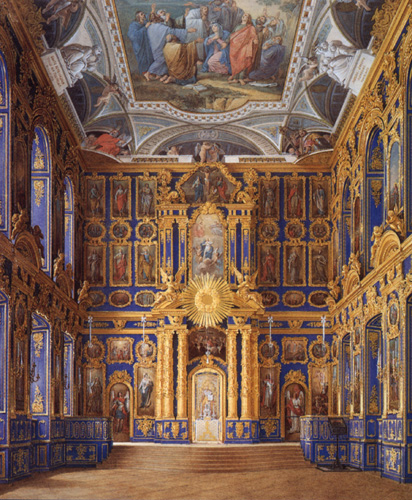
Palace Chapel of the Catherine Palace

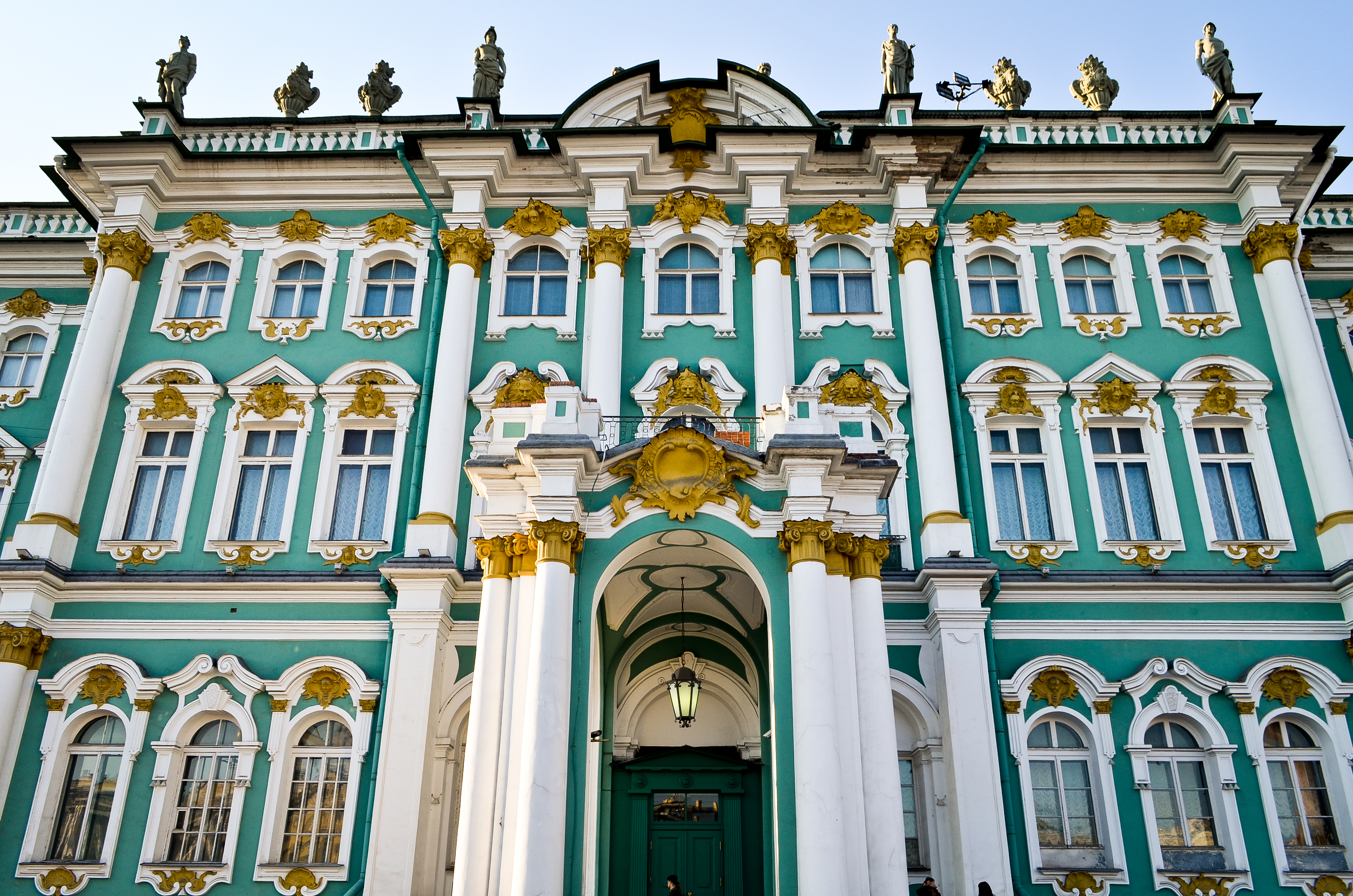
Detail of the Winter Palace

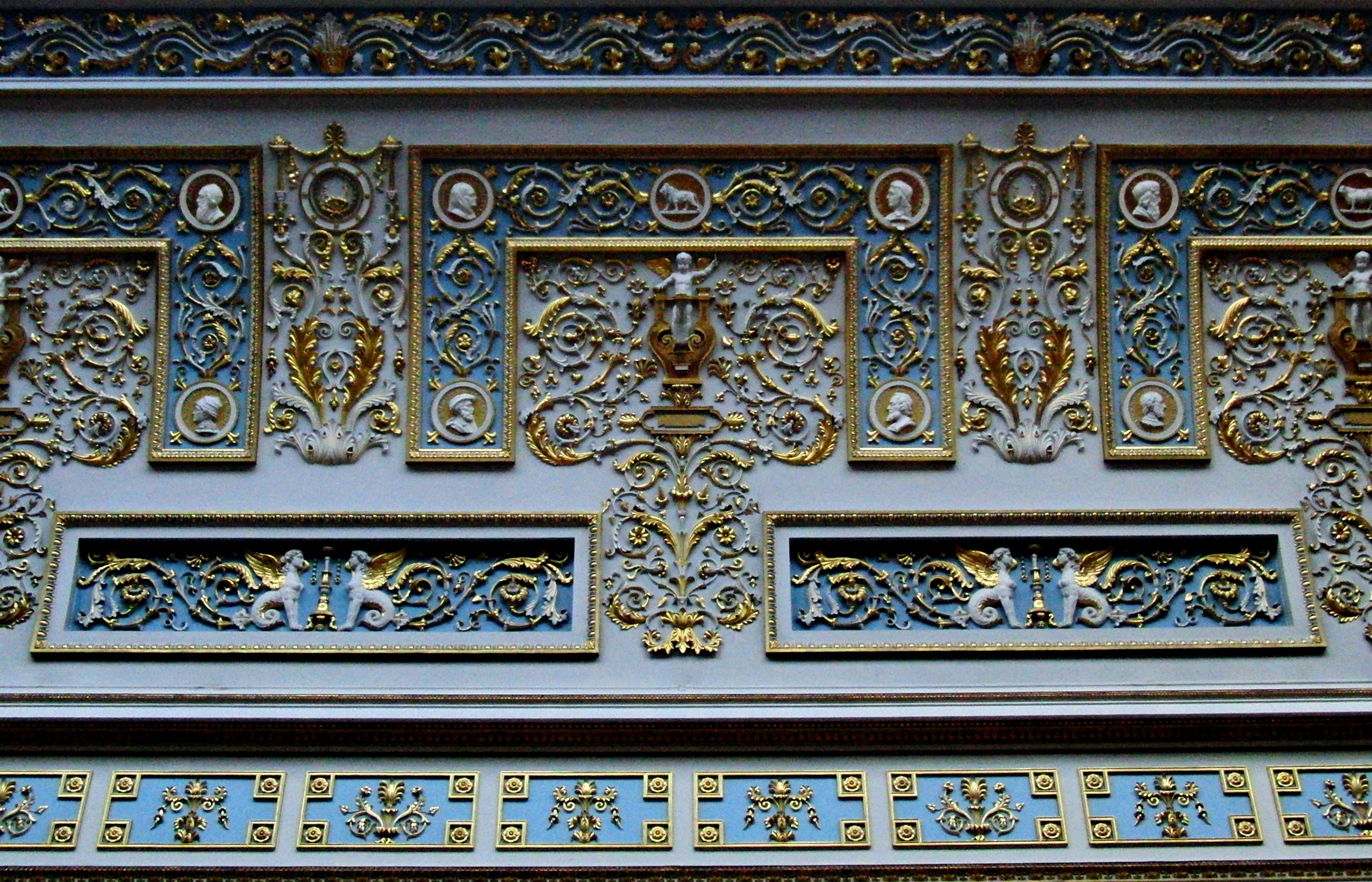
Stucco wall of the Winter Palace

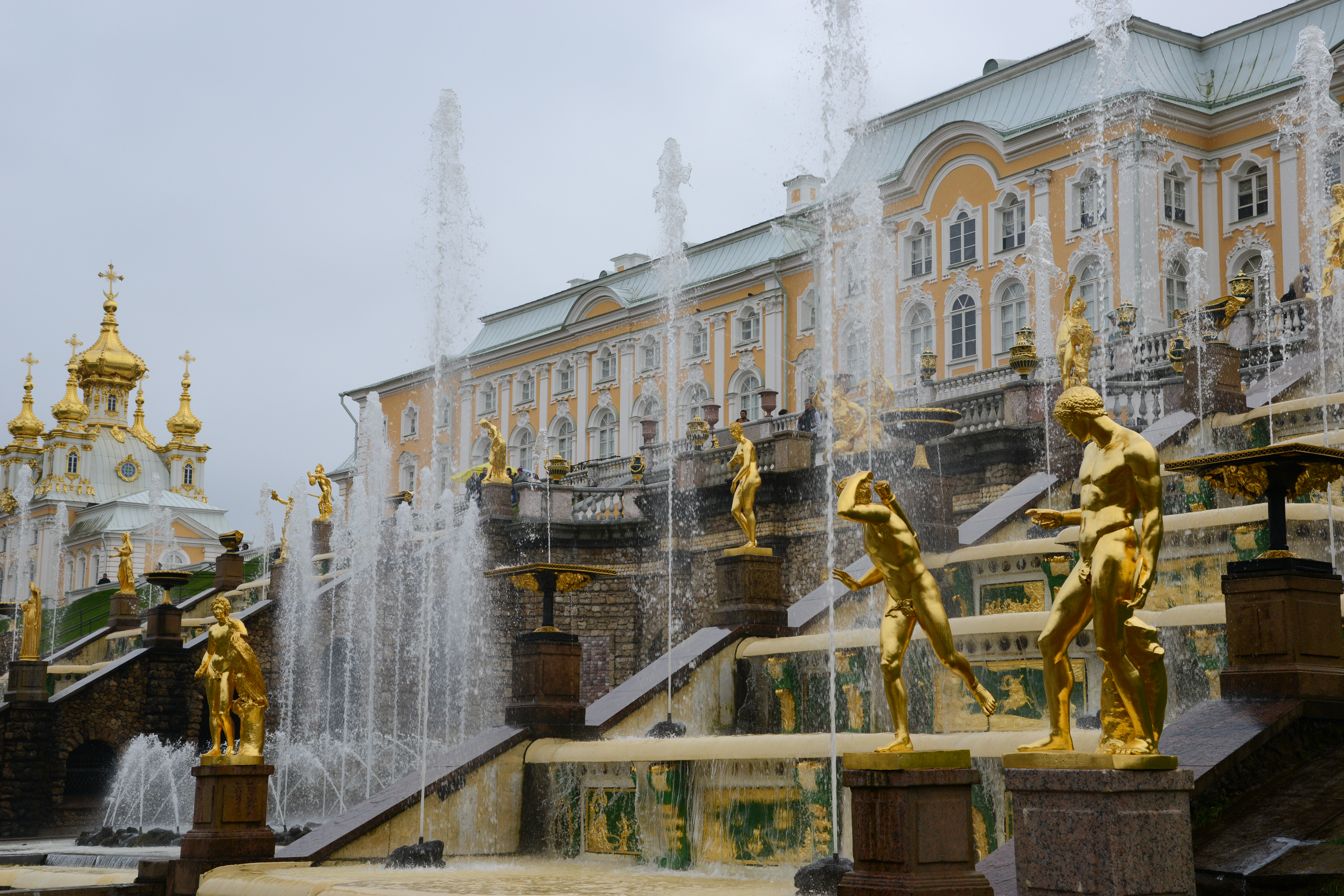
Grand Cascade at the Peterhof Palace

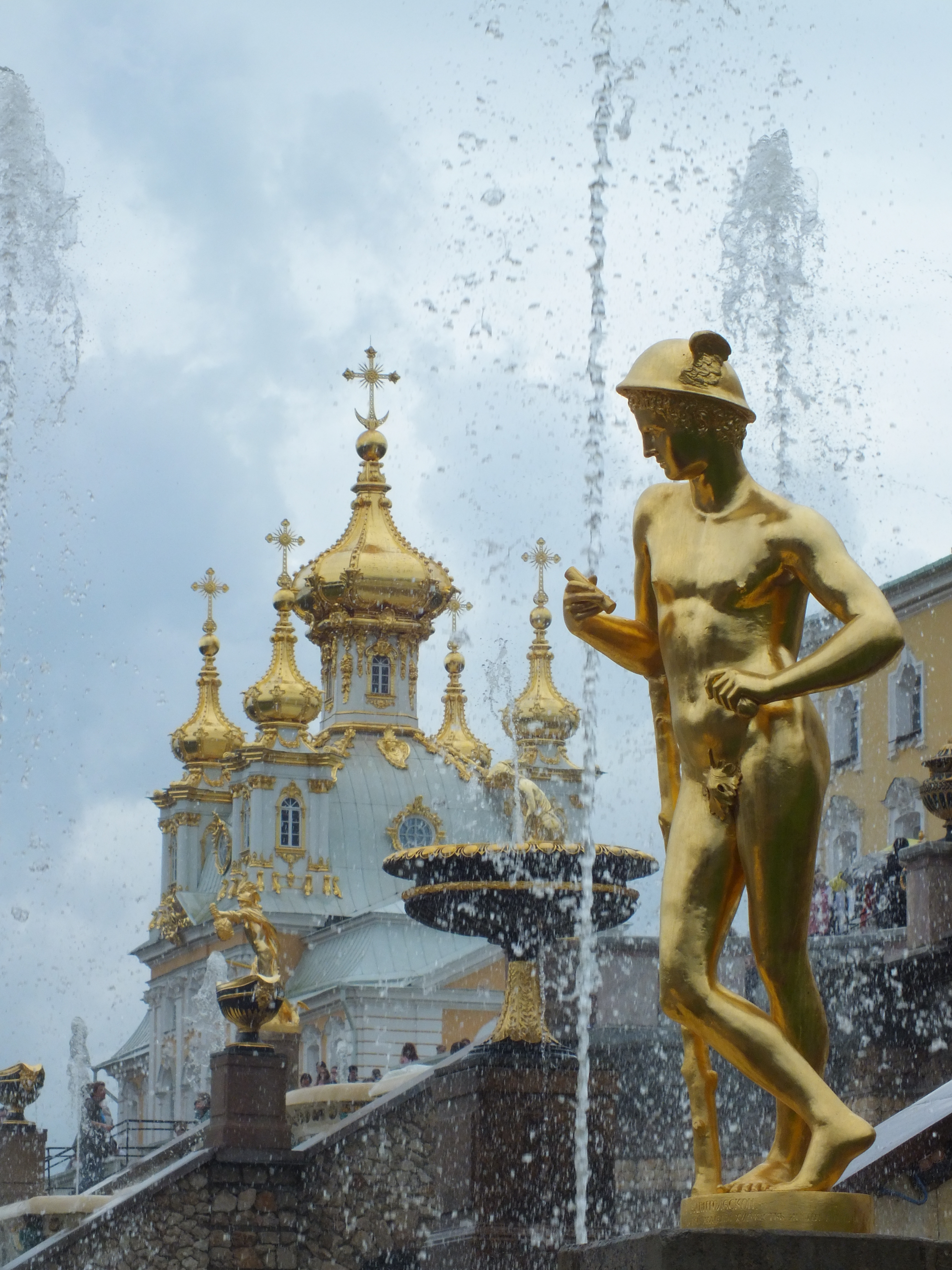
Grand Cascade and the church

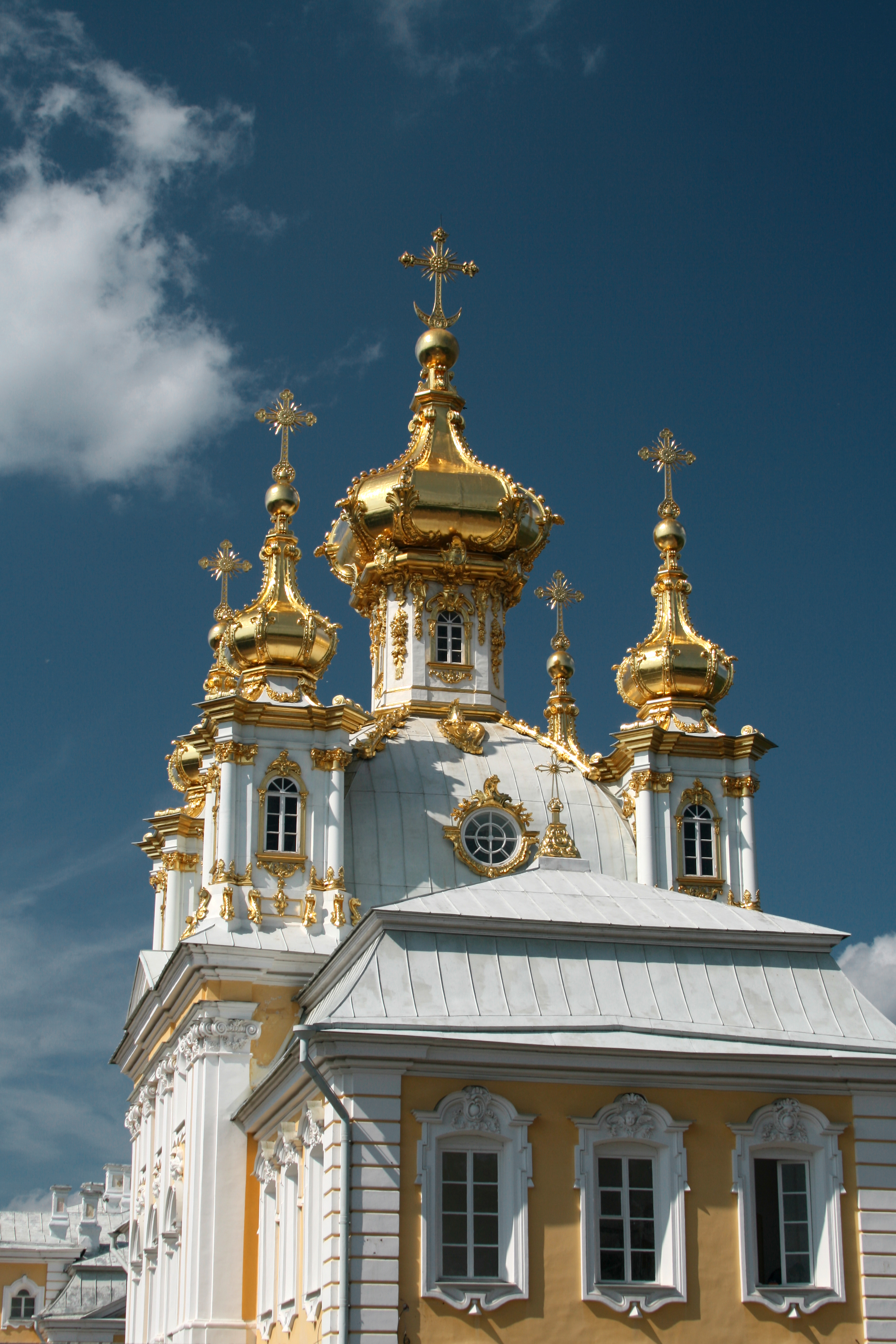
Church at Peterhof Palace

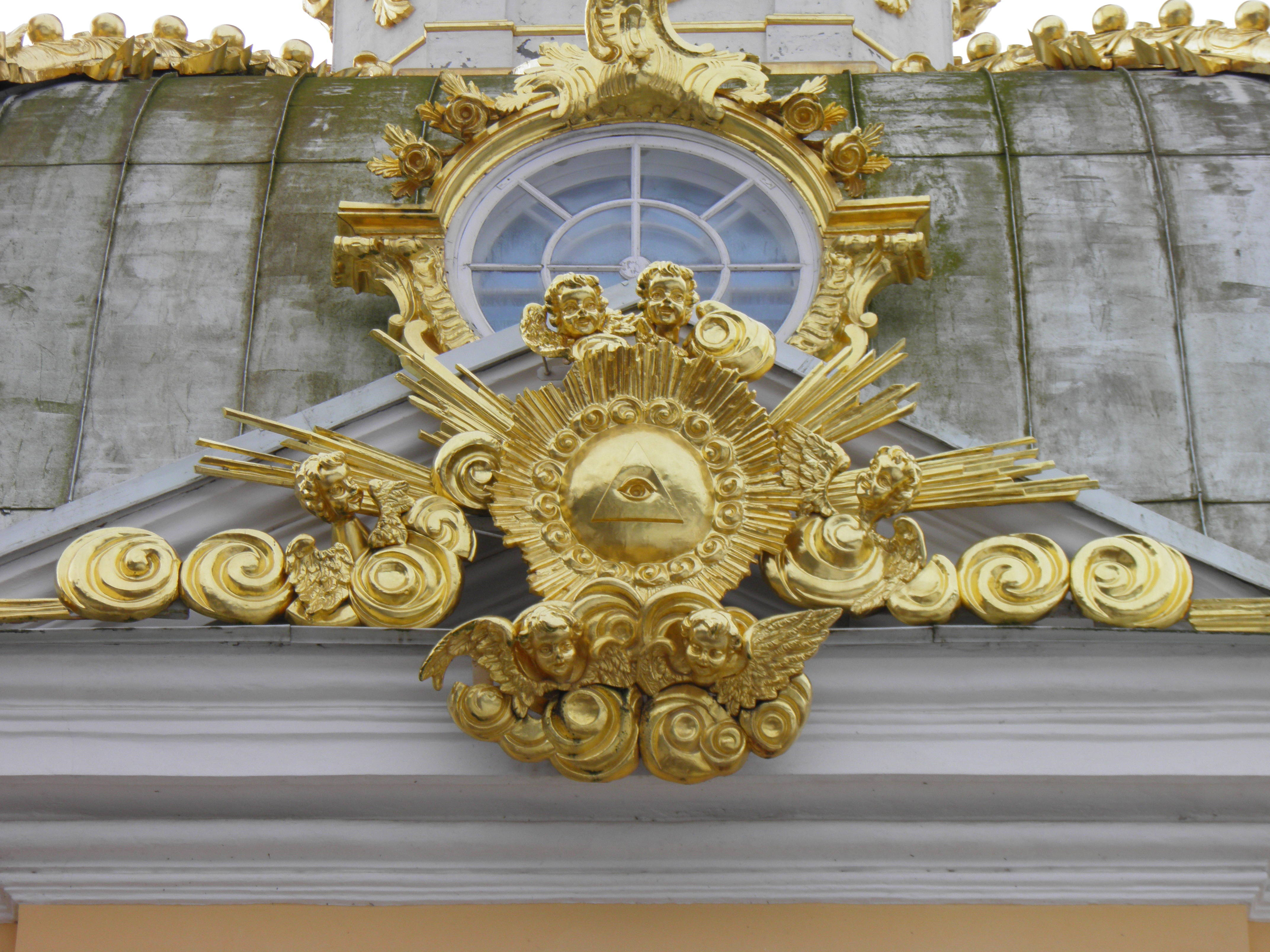
Detail of the church at Peterhof Palace

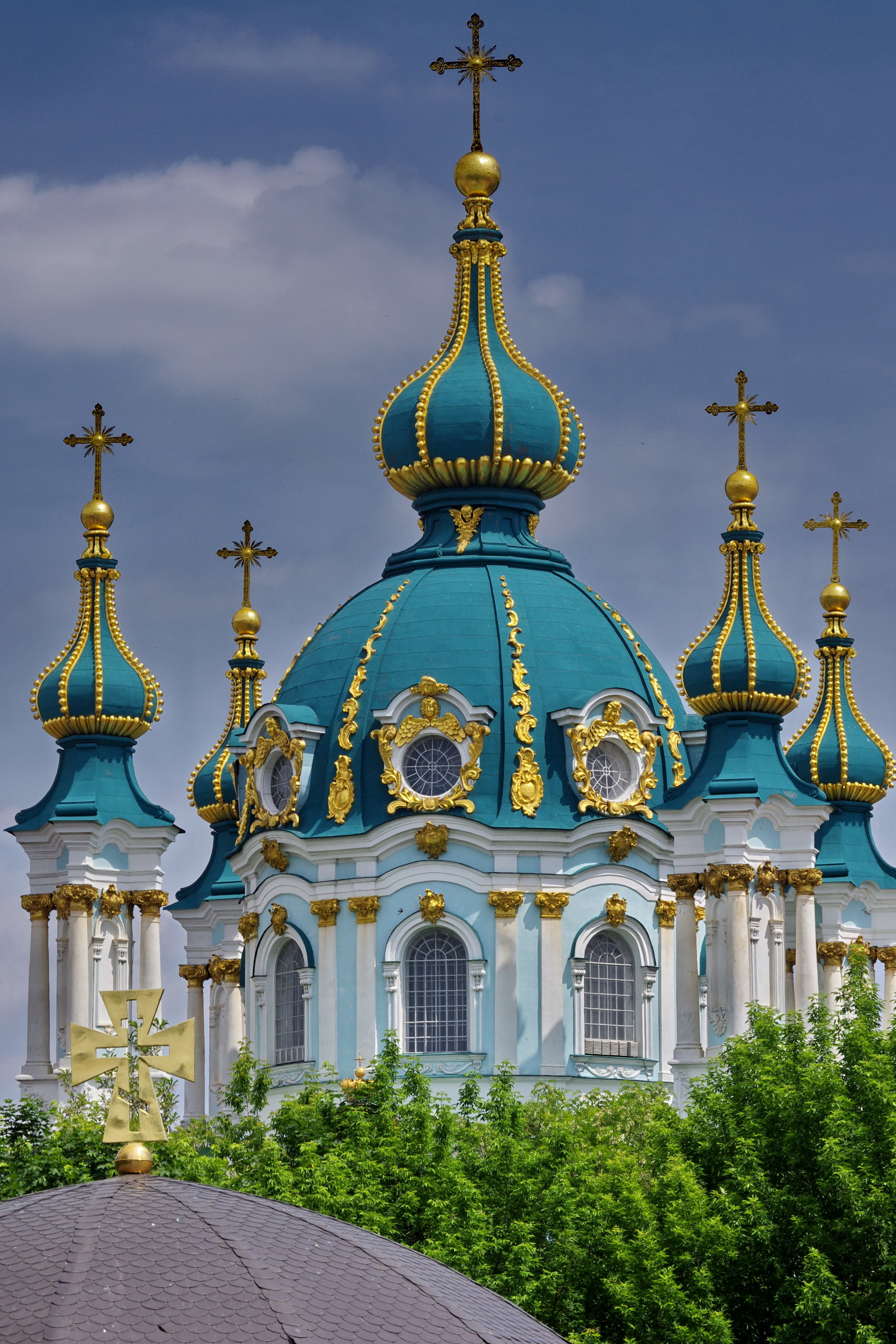
St Andrew's Church, Kyiv

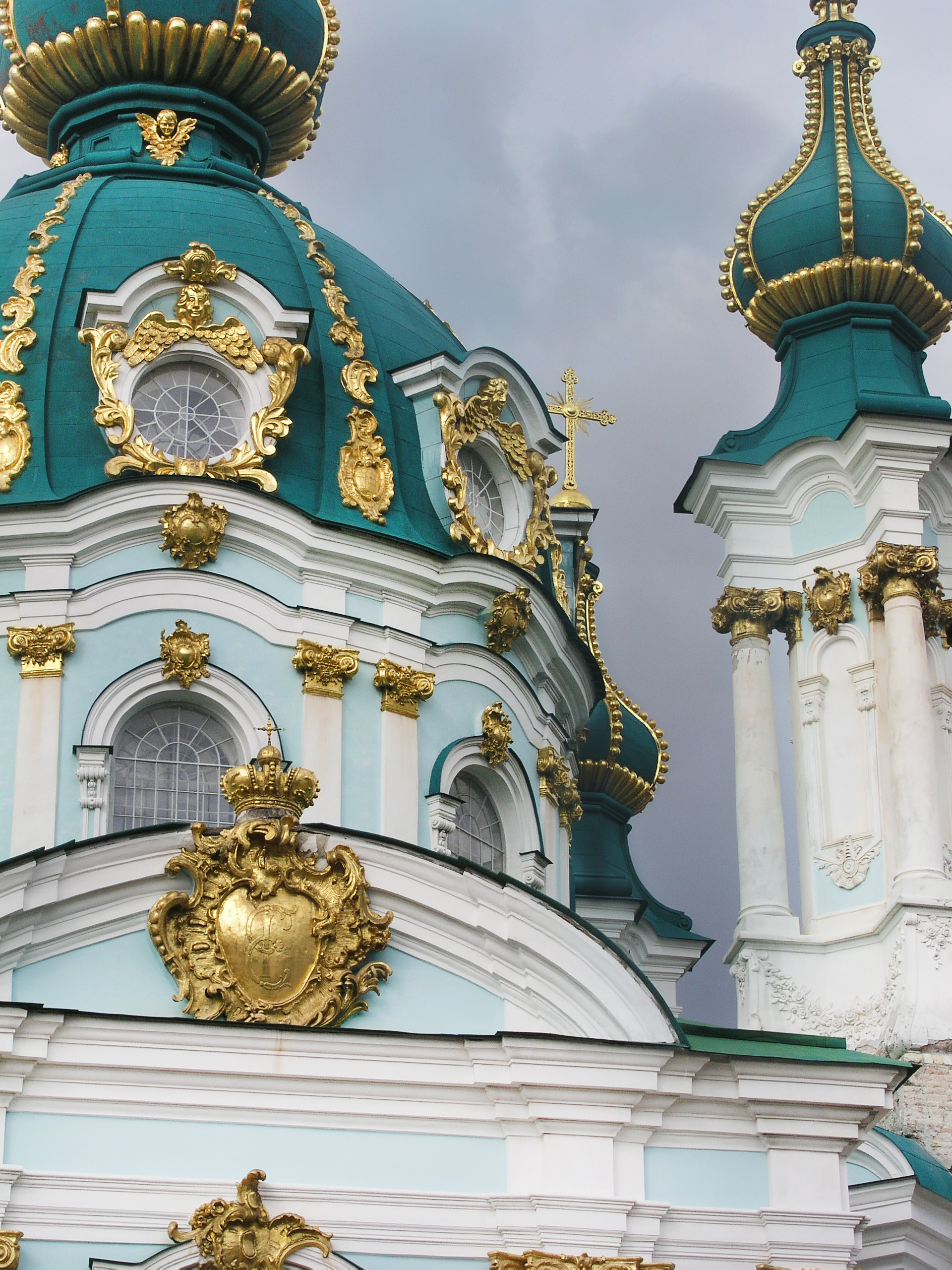
Detail of St. Andrew's Church

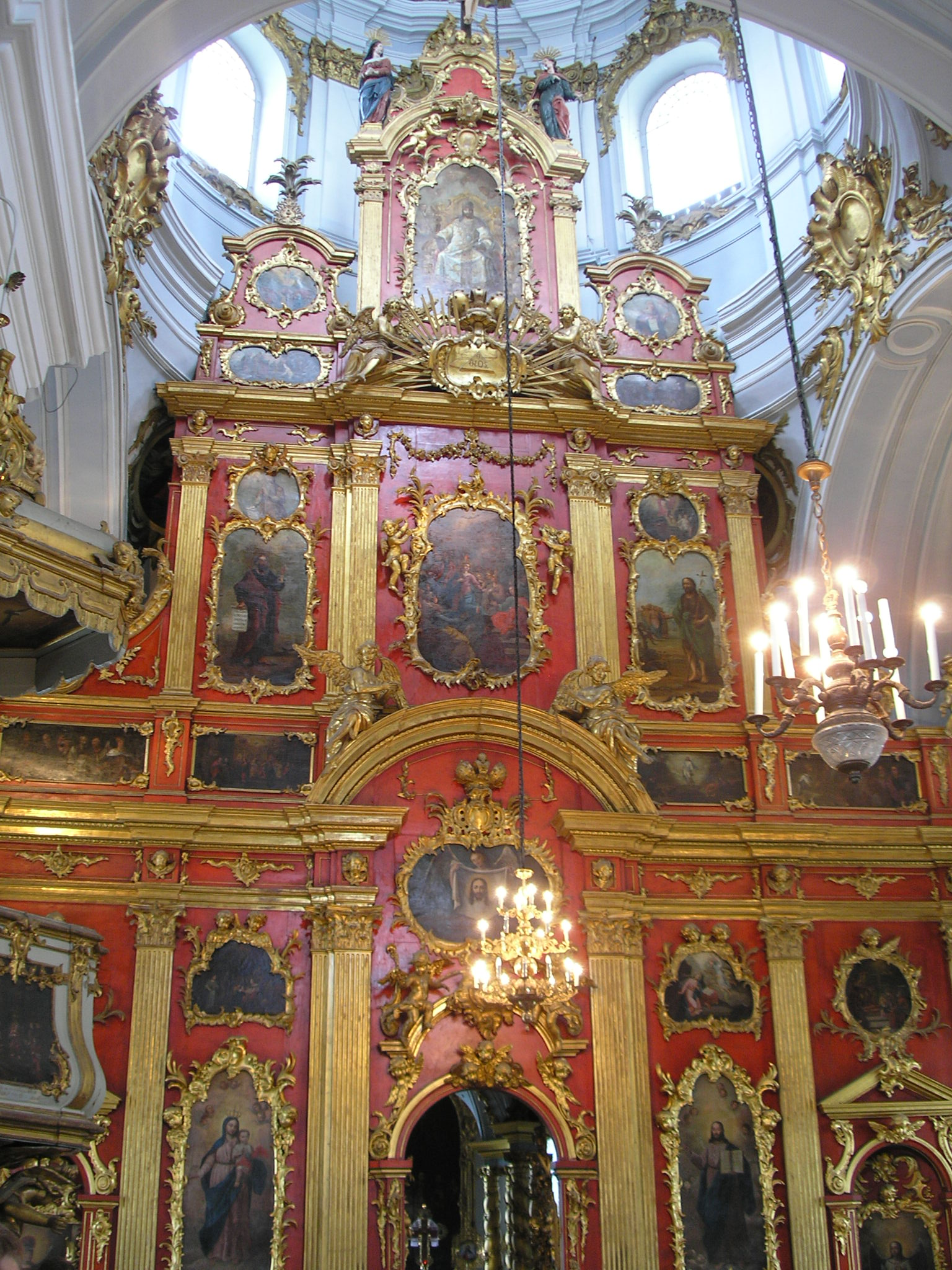
Iconostasis in St. Andrew's Church
