= Trezzo =

Trezzo may refer to:

- Trezzo sull'Adda, comune in the Metropolitan City of Milan in the Italian region Lombardy
- Trezzo Tinella, a comune in the Province of Cuneo in the Italian region Piedmont

== See also ==
- Trezzi, a surname
- Trezzano (disambiguation)
