= Trezzini =

Trezzini is an Italian surname (can be of Swiss origin), best known for architects, notable for their work in Russia in the 18th century. Notable persons with the surname include:

- Angelo Trezzini (1827–1904), Italian painter of Swiss origin
- Domenico Trezzini (1670, Astano - 1734 Saint Petersburg), russified to Andrey Yakimovich Trezin or Andrey Petrovich Trezin, was the first Ticino architect to settle in Russia, notable for development of Petrine Baroque and building Saint Petersburg's first stone structures.
- Giuseppe Trezzini (1732, Astano - 1785, Lugano), was an architect in Saint Peterburg
- Giuseppe Siro Trezzini (1925–1979), Italian politician, M.P.
- Pietro Antonio Trezzini (1692 - after 1760), russified as Pyotr Trezin, also an architect, has worked with Domenico Trezzini. He is, most likely, not Domenico's son. Pietro Trezzini is credited with Baroque buildings in Saint Petersburg and St. Clement's Church in Moscow.

== See also ==
- 19994 Tresini, minor planet, named after Domenico Trezzini
- Trezzi
