= Tiezzi =

Tiezzi is an Italian surname. Notable people with the surname include:

- Andrea Tiezzi (born 1964), Argentine tennis player
- Augusto Tiezzi (1910–1990), Italian cinematographer
- Clara Tiezzi (born 1999), Brazilian actress
- Gage Tiezzi (born 2009), Competitive Swimmer

== See also ==
- Trezzi
