= St. Vladimir's Cathedral (Saint Petersburg) =

Russian Orthodox cathedral in Saint Petersburg, Russia

Coordinates: 59.9518°N 30.2954°E

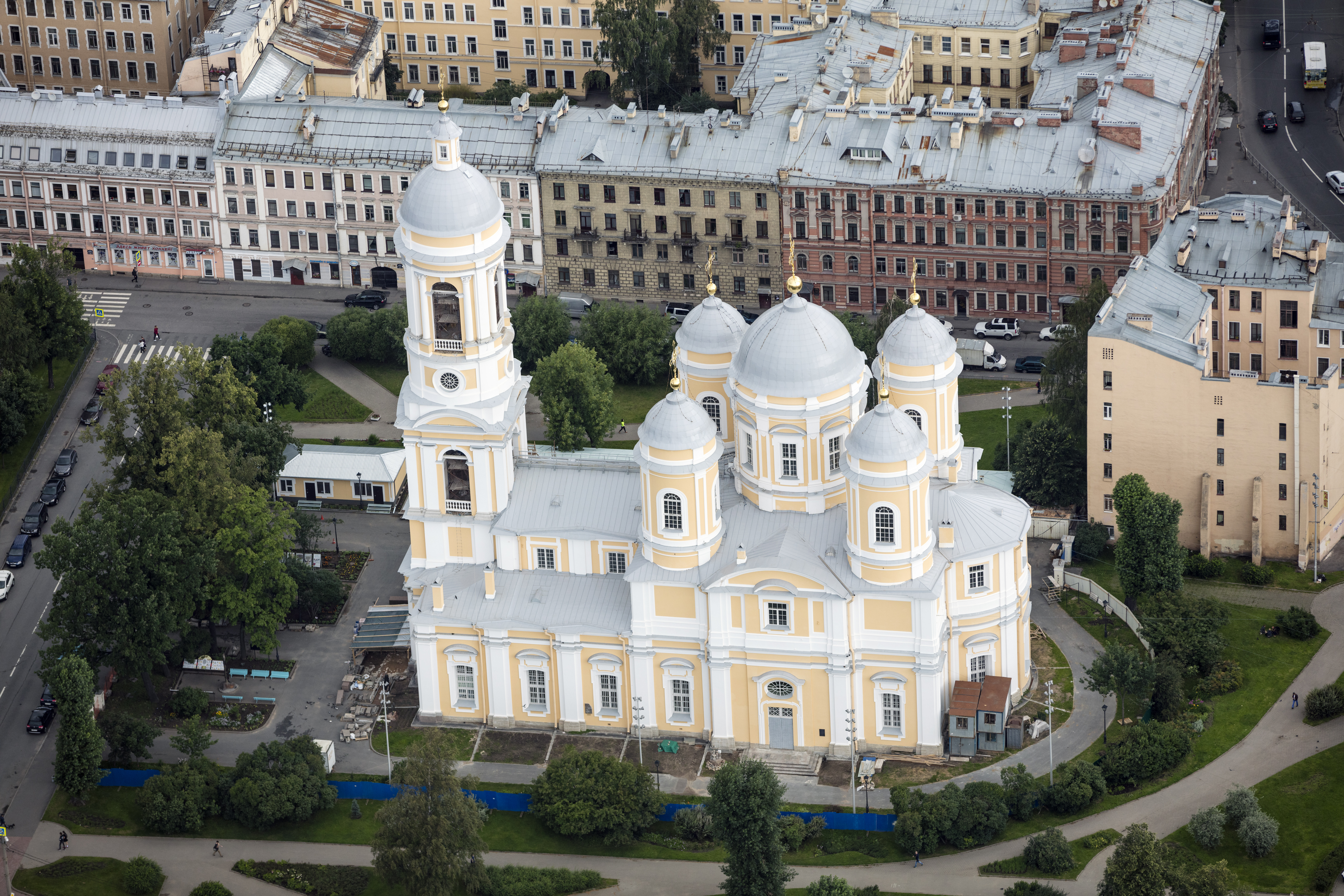
Aerial view of St. Vladimir's Cathedral (2016)

The Prince St. Vladimir's Cathedral (Russian: Князь-Владимирский Собор), formally the Cathedral of St. Equal to the Apostles Prince Vladimir (собор Святого равноапостольного князя Владимира) is a Russian Orthodox cathedral in Saint Petersburg, Russia. It is located on Blokhin Street in the Petrogradsky District of the city across the Malaya Neva from the Spit of Vasilevsky Island, in close proximity to the Sportivnaya metro station.

== History ==
The first wooden church built in 1708 on the site was dedicated to St. Nicholas. This church was replaced by a masonry church dedicated to the Assumption completed in 1719.

In 1740, a stone church was built next to the Cathedral of the Assumption by order of the Empress Anna. It was designed by Pietro Trezzini. The Late Baroque building was left incomplete when the Empress Elizabeth came to the throne in 1742.

A new project was begun in 1763, this time supervised by Antonio Rinaldi, but that too was left incomplete following a fire in 1772. The side altar was dedicated to the Assumption in 1772, but the entire Neoclassical edifice was only completed to Ivan Starov's designs in 1789 and dedicated to St. Vladimir.

In the Soviet period, the cathedral was closed in 1928. From 1938 to 1941, it served as the metropolitan cathedral of the city. From 1941 to 2001, the Icon of Our Lady of Kazan was located into the cathedral before its transfer to the Kazan Cathedral on Nevsky Prospekt. In 2015, extensive restoration work was done on the cathedral to preserve the 18th-19th-century facades.
