= Transfiguration Cathedral (Saint Petersburg) =

Eastern Orthodox cathedral in Russia

Coordinates: 59.943°N 30.352°E

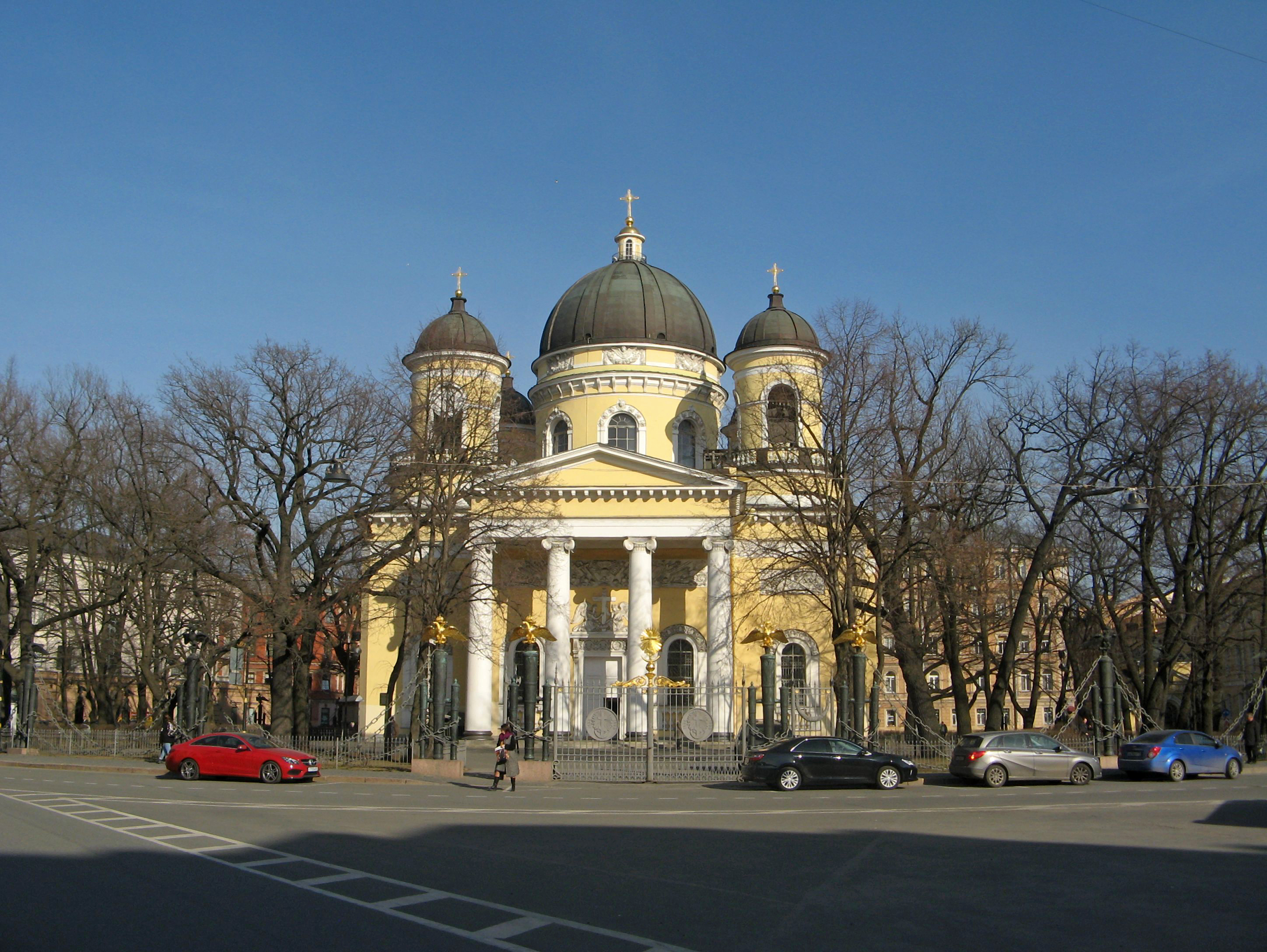
Transfiguration Cathedral in Saint Petersburg, Russia

Transfiguration Cathedral (official name: Russian: собор Преображения Господня всей гвардии, The Cathedral of the Lord's Transfiguration of all the Guards) is an Eastern Orthodox cathedral. It is located on Transfiguration Square (Russian: Преображенская площадь), just off Liteyny Prospekt near the Chernyshevskaya metro station. Unlike most Russian churches, it has never ceased operating as a place of worship.

The church has given names to both Transfiguration Square and a nearby lane, which was formerly known as Church Lane (Russian: Церковный переулок) and is now known as Radishchev Lane (Russian: переулок Радищева).

== History ==
Construction of the cathedral was ordered by empress Elizabeth of Russia and occurred from 1743 to 1754, based on a design by architect Mikhail Zemtsov. The cathedral was built in the place of an old barracks, that of the grenadier division of the Preobrazhensky regiment in honor of the Empress's ascension onto the throne with the help of some soldiers and officers of that regiment. The cornerstone was laid June 9, 1743. After the death of Mikhail Zemtsov, Pietro Antonio Trezzini headed construction. Trezzini slightly altered the project, changing the style to Baroque. The cathedral was blessed by archbishop Sylvester 16 [O.S. 1754] August in the presence of the empress, on the eve of the holy day of the Transfiguration of Christ. The iconostasis and the altar canopy were completed by Kobilinsky woodcutters from Moscow from the drawings of architect Francesco Bartolomeo Rastrelli. The figures were painted by M. L. Kolokolnikov.

During the reign of the emperor Paul I, the regimental Transfiguration Cathedral received the honorary title "of all the Guards", November 12, 1796.

August 8 (August 20, New Style), 1825, the first Transfiguration Cathedral was lost to fire. All that remained of the cathedral were the exterior walls and the essential sacred objects, which had been saved.

Between 1825 and 1829 it was rebuilt by architect Vasily Stasov in the Empire style that exists today. Metropolitan Serafim dedicated the rebuilt cathedral, August 5 (August 17, New Style), 1829. The main altar was dedicated in honor of the holy day of the Transfiguration of Christ, the right (southern) side chapel in honor of the Venerable Sergius of Radonezh, and the left (northern) side chapel in honor of the martyrs Pope Clement I and Pyotr Aleksandriysky, both of whose feast day is marked November 25 (Old Style).

A parish charitable society began at the cathedral in 1871, maintaining an almshouse, a children's shelter, a cafeteria, a school for children of soldiers, and free living quarters. In 1912, it was joined by a Brotherhood of Sobriety and Chastity. On the holy day of the Transfiguration of Christ (popular name - the Apple Savior), which occurs 6 August (Old Style), the cathedral has traditionally hosted a fruit bazaar.

After the 1917 October Revolution the cathedral remained open for worship. In 1918 it became a parish church, and the banners, ordnance, and war trophies kept there were removed and transferred to the Artillery Museum; since 1950 those relics have been part of the Hermitage collection. Also during the 1920s many valuable icons were removed.

From 1922 to 1926 (under Antonin Granovsky's Union of Church Regeneration) and from 1935 to the spring of 1944 the cathedral was controlled by the Renovationists; and from 1939, after the Church of the Savior on the Sennaya closed, it was the main Renovationist church in Leningrad. During the Siege of Leningrad an air-raid shelter capable of holding 500 people was constructed in the basement, where first aid was given to the wounded.

The façades and interior were restored between 1946 and 1948.

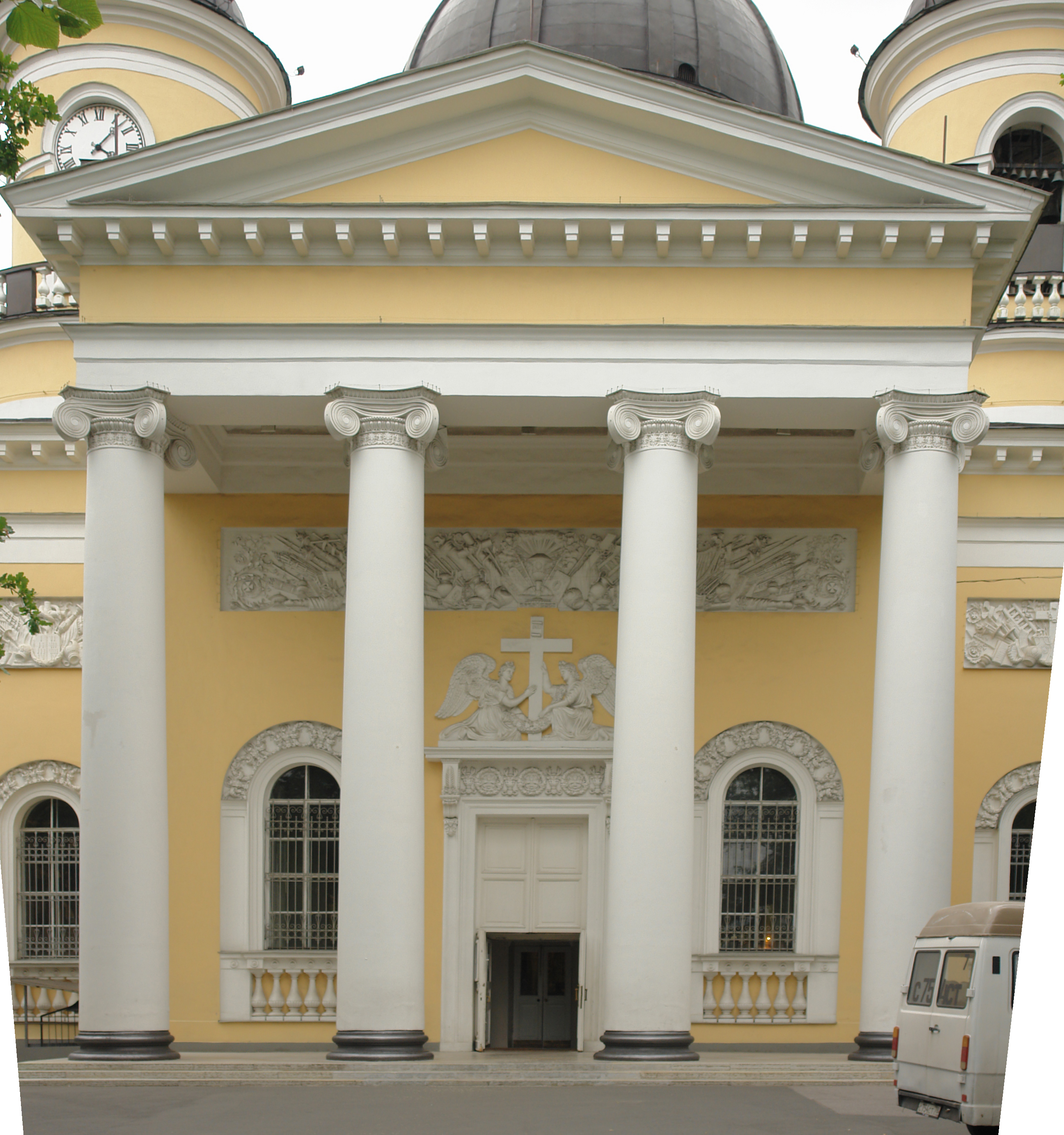
Western portico

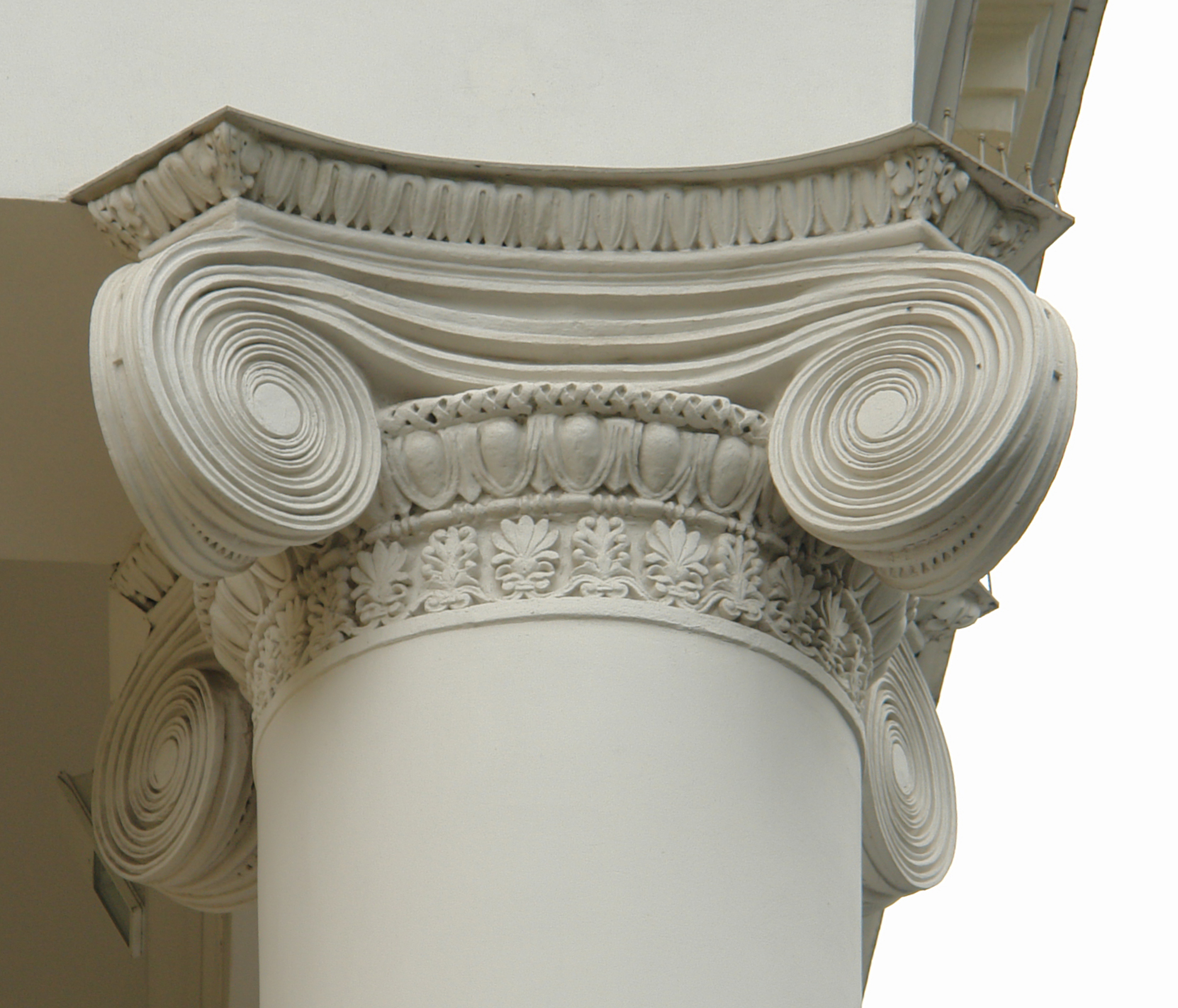
A column capital

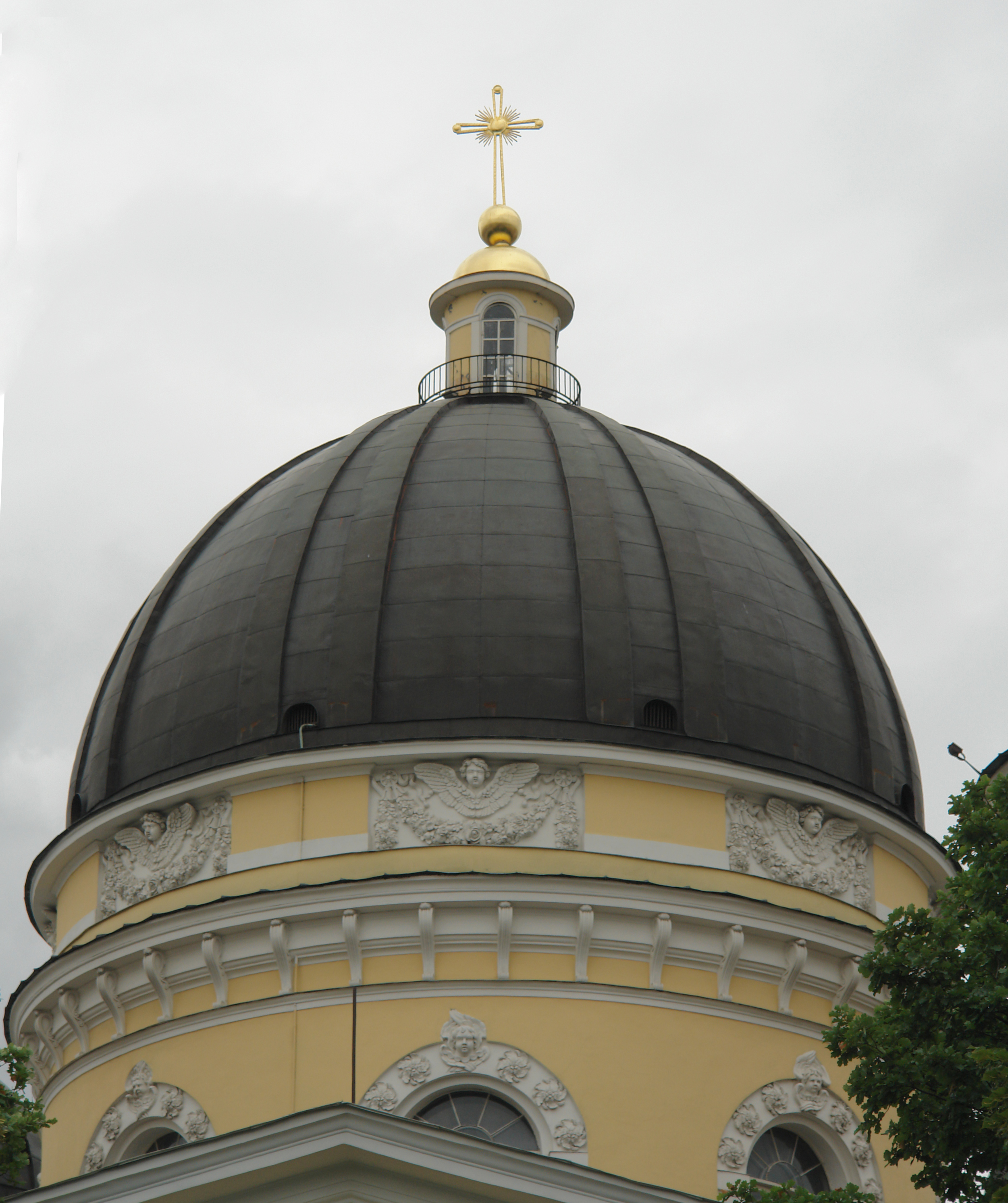
The main dome
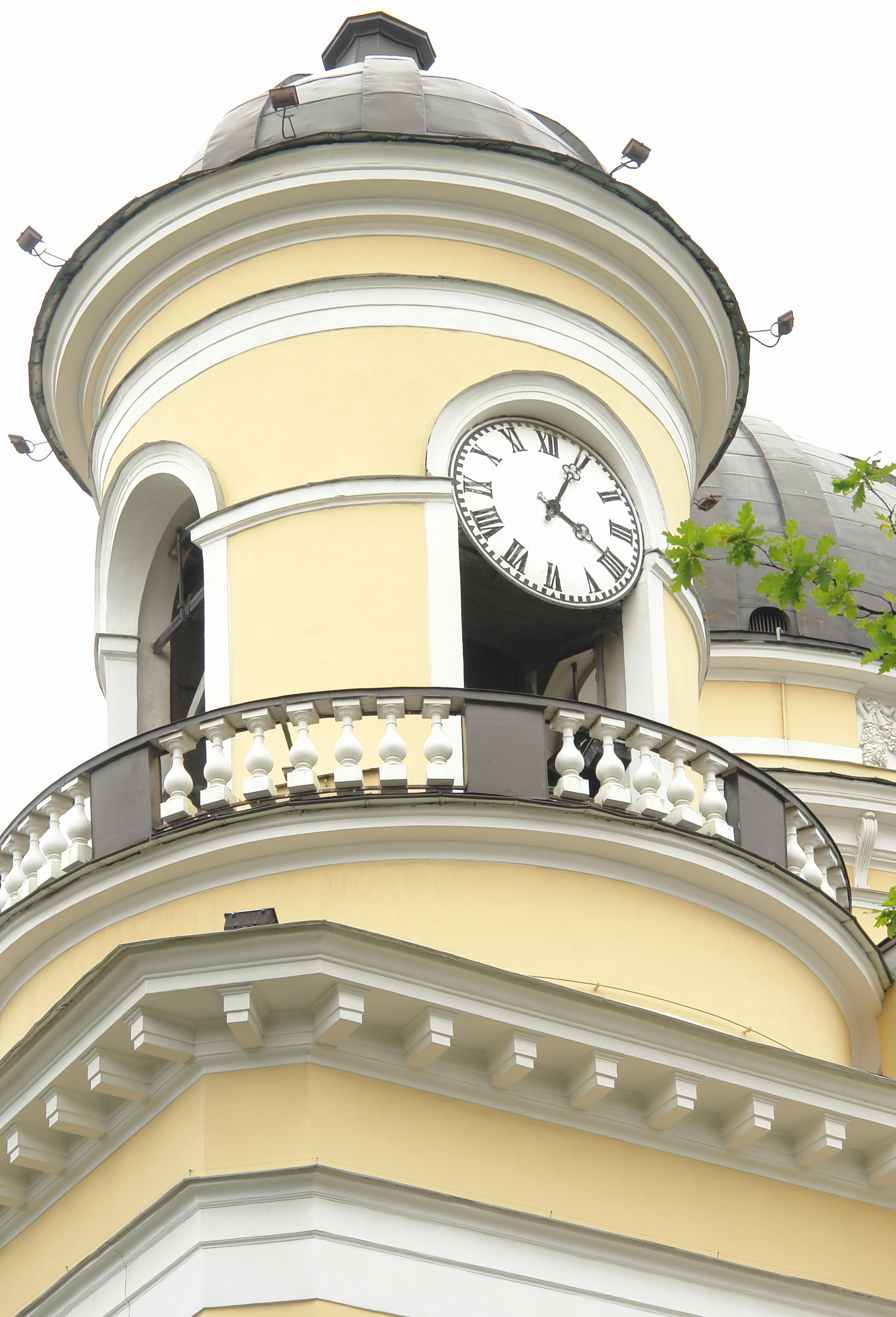
Bell tower and clock

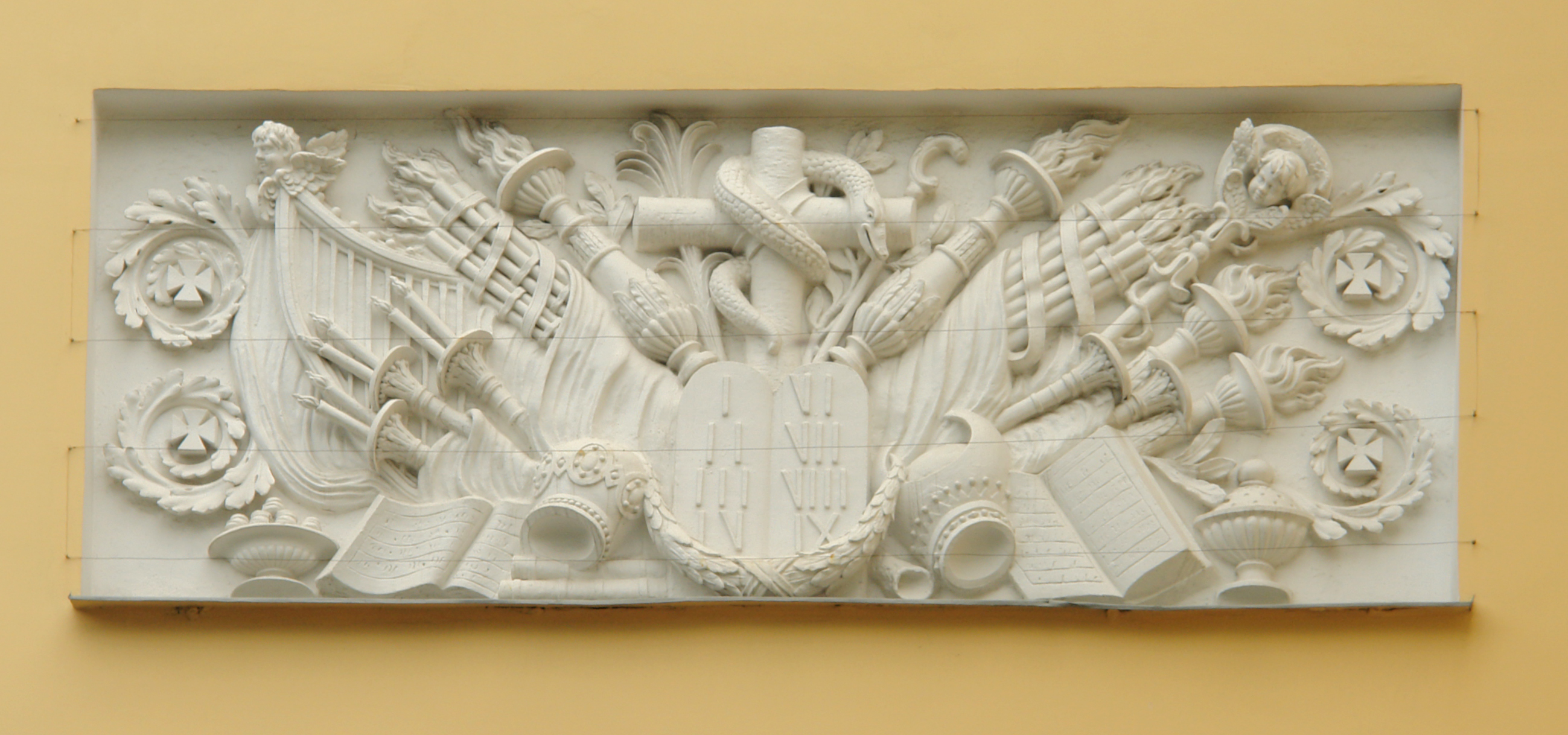
Panel with military imagery

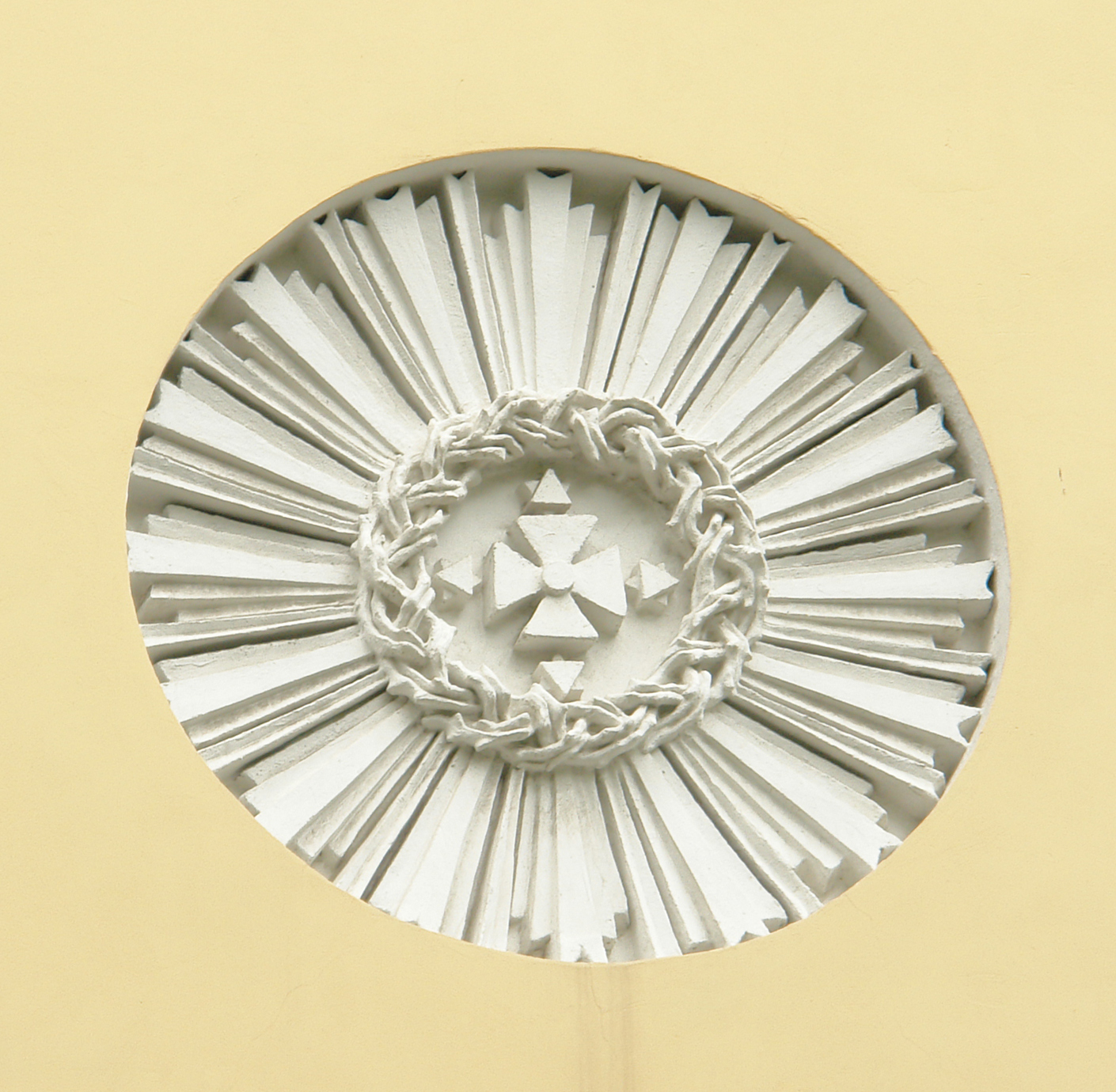
Bas-relief decoration

== Fence ==
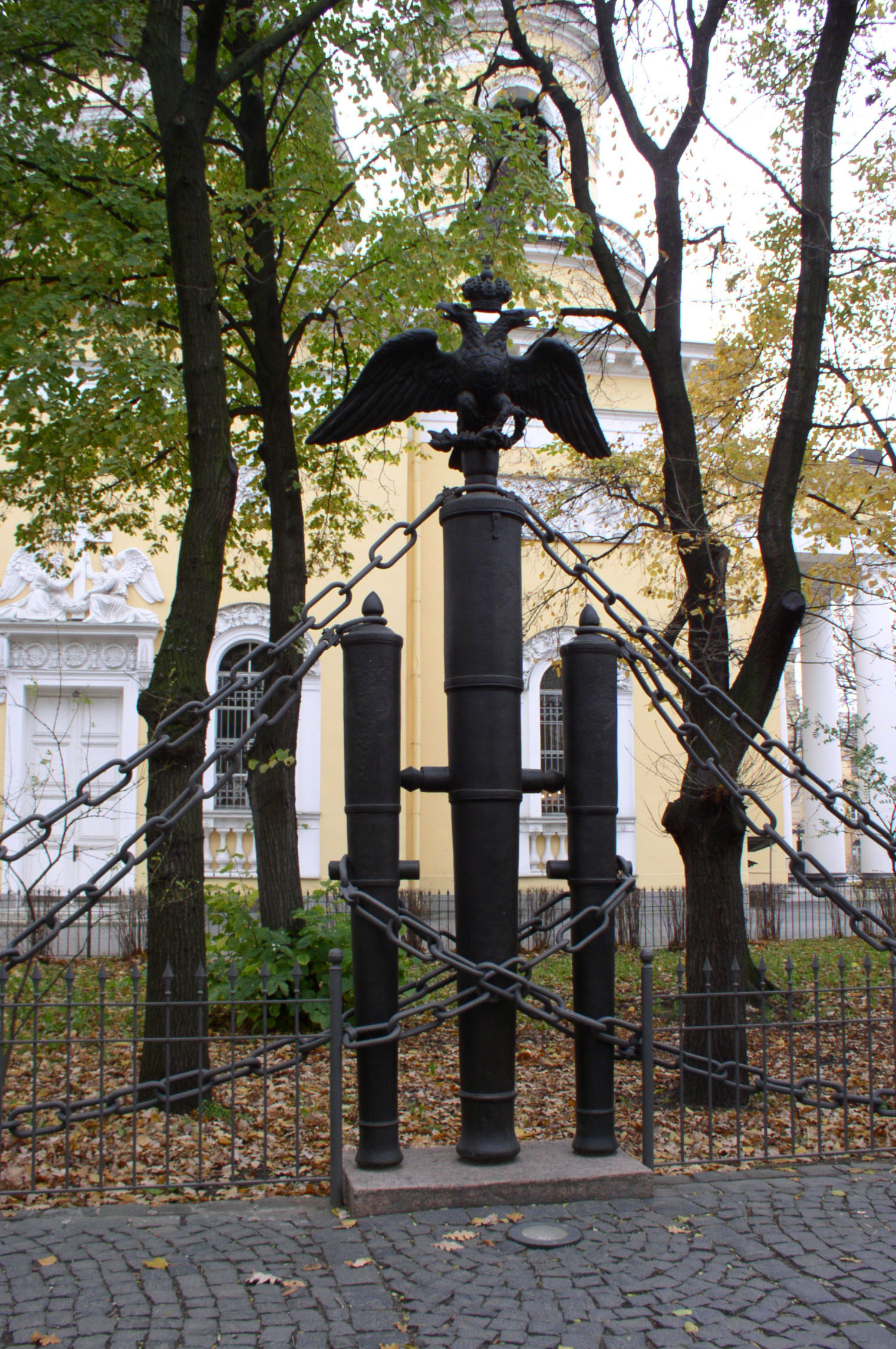
Portion of the fence

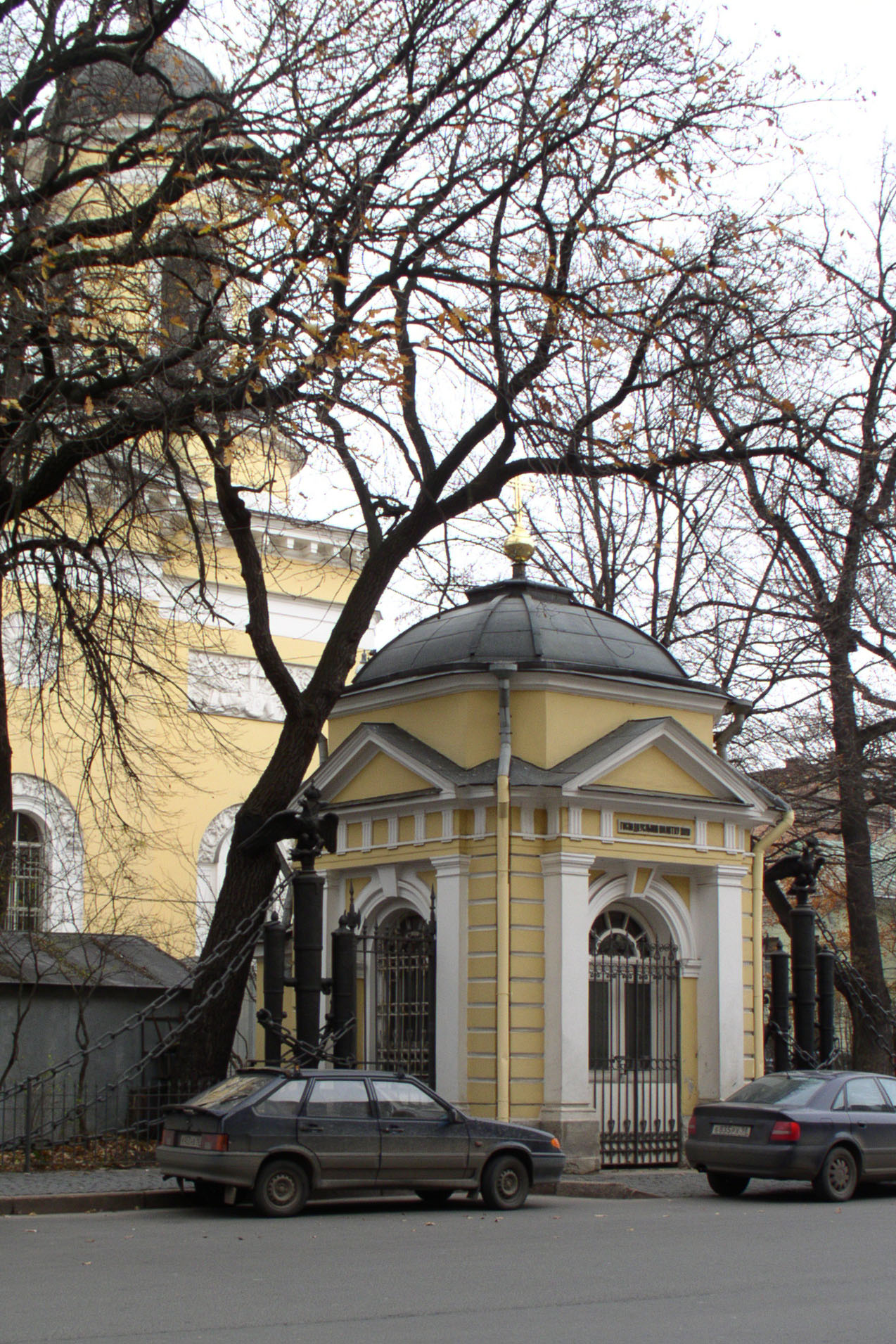
Chapel in the cathedral fence

Stasov directed construction of a fence around the cathedral in 1832-1833 commemorating the victory in the Russo-Turkish War of 1828-1829, the basis of which was the barrels of cannons taken from Turkish fortresses in Izmail, Varna, Tul'chi, Isakchi, and Silistra, and from the battle at Kulevchi. The engraved coat of arms of the Ottoman Empire is preserved on the barrels and some also bear the names given to the cannons: The Wrath of Allah, Sacred Crescent, Spewing Thunder, I Give Only Death. Trophy cannons shooting 18- and 24-pound balls were set aside as a gift to the cathedral by order of Emperor Nicholas I.

The fence consists of 102 bronze cannon barrels, in groups of three, set on thirty-four granite bases. They are set with the muzzles facing downwards to signify they will never again be used in combat. The central barrel of each grouping is topped with a crowned double-headed eagle. The barrel groups are linked by massive decorative chains. The two main gates are decorated with shields with bronze depictions of the medals presented for the war. Also, around the cathedral stand twelve cannons and two Unicorn (long-barreled) cannons, which are the property of the Preobrazhensky regiment.

In 1886, architect Ivan Blazheyevich Slupsky designed a chapel built into the fence. In 1916, architect Sergei Osipovich Ovsyannikov planned construction of a burial-vault for the burial of officers fallen in World War I, but the project was never realized.

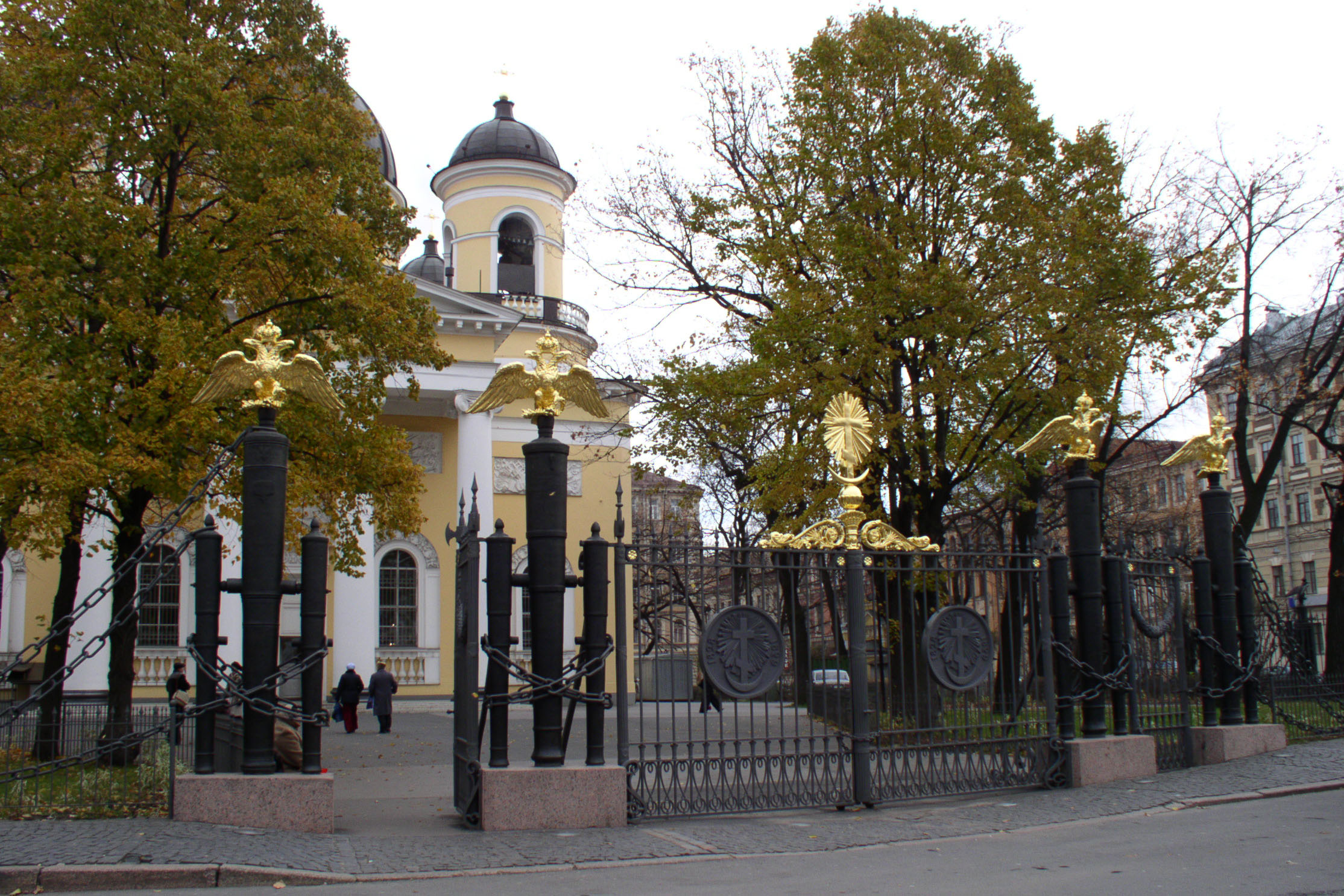
Main gate

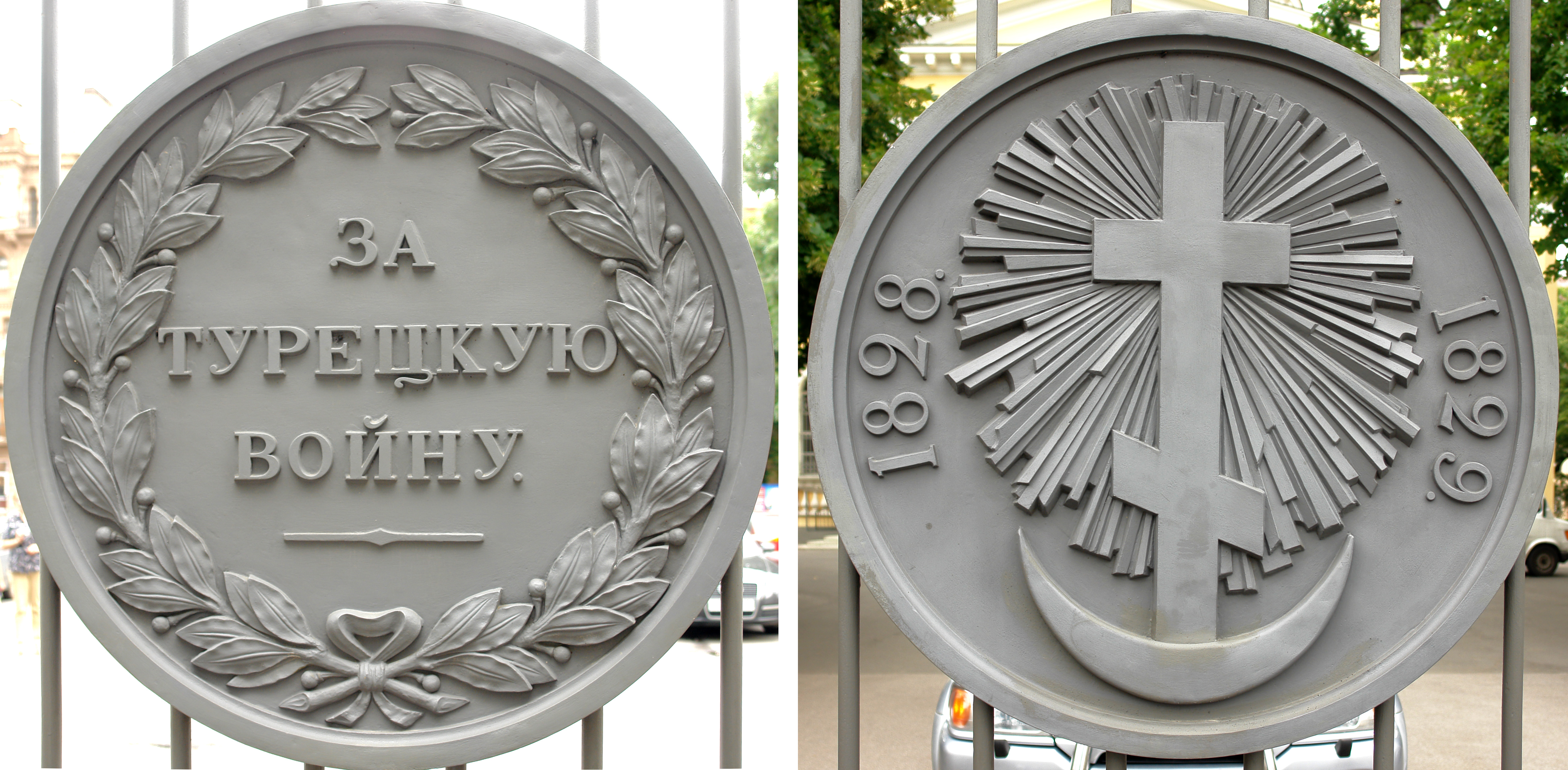
Medals on the two sides of the main gate

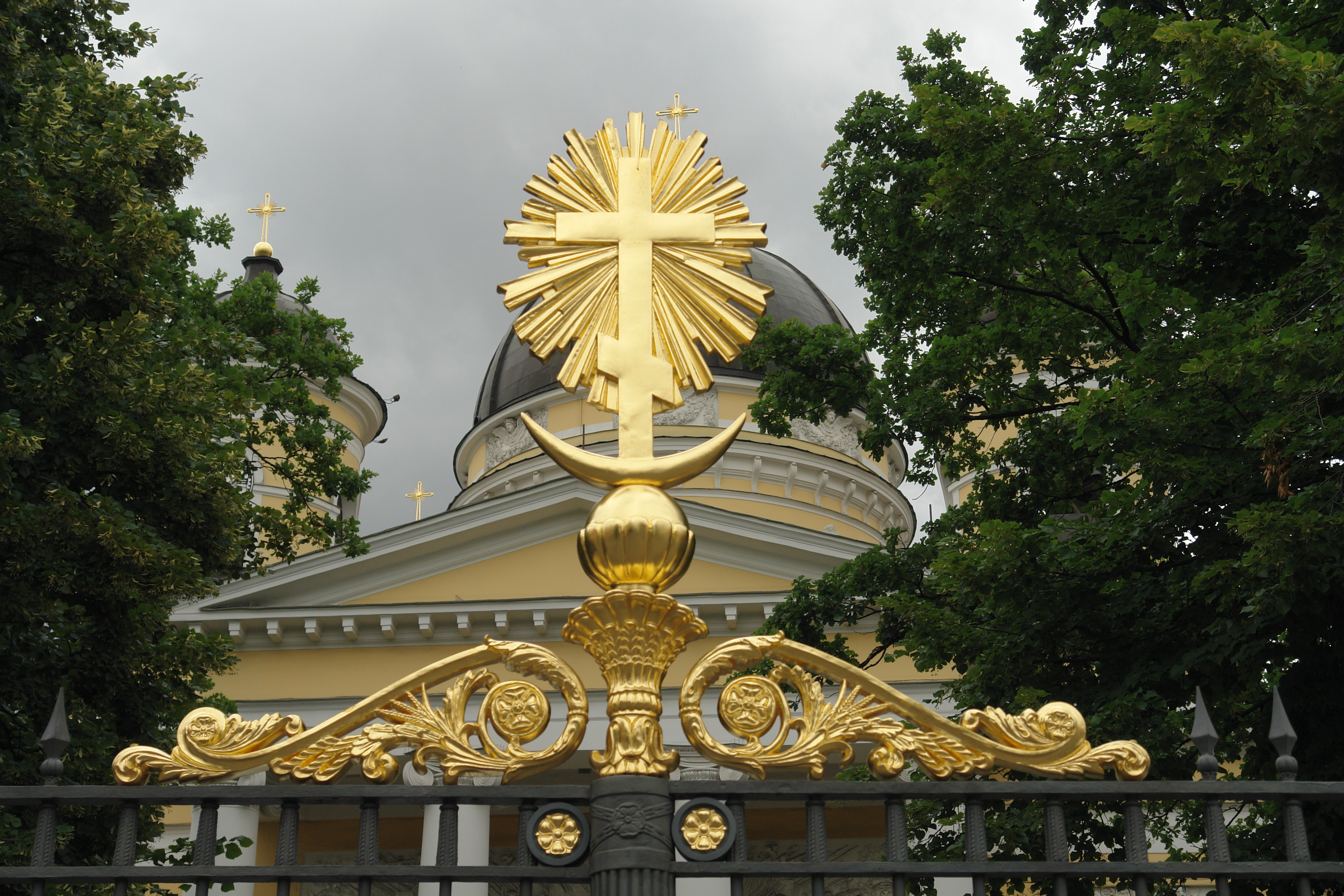
Central decoration on the main gate

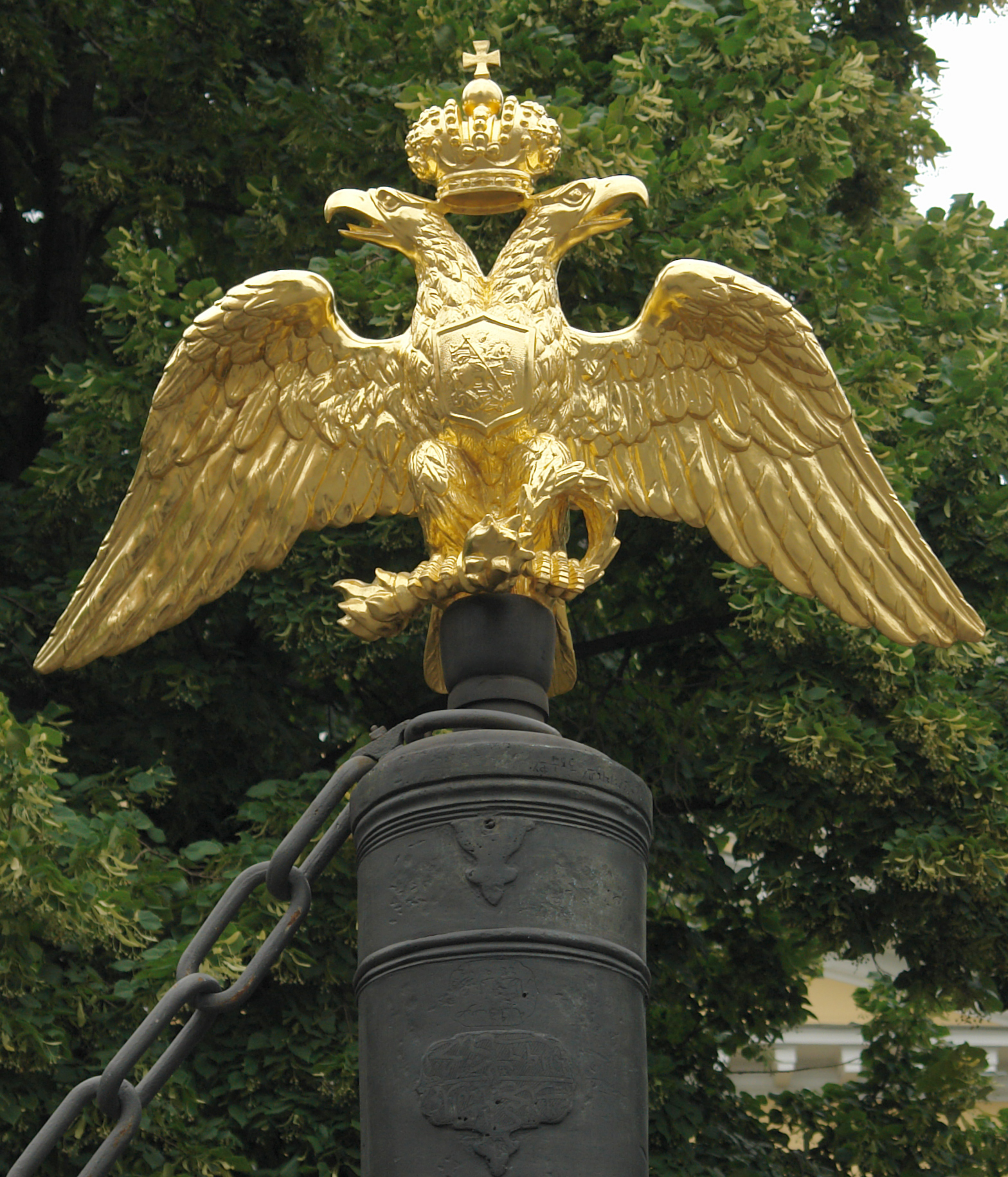
Double-headed eagle on one of the barrels

== Relics and Holy Objects ==
In a side chapel near the north wall of the church is a hinged icon with depictions of the Transfiguration of Christ, the martyr Pantaleon, and the emperor Saint Constantine. The icon was given to the regiment's field hospital in 1900 by the commander of the regiment at the time, the general-major Grand Duke Constantine Constantinovich. On a lectern (bookstand) in the right kliros of the church is an icon of the Image of Edessa, brought there in 1938 from the Trinity Church on Stremyannaya Street (Saint Petersburg). It was created by the famous Moscow icon-painter Simon Ushakov for Tsar Alexei Mikhailovich and was the favorite icon of Peter the Great and accompanied him at the founding of Saint Petersburg, at the Battle of Poltava, on his deathbed and at his funeral. On the lectern in the left kliros is another celebrated icon, that of the Mother Mary, Joy of All Who Sorrow. It is a copy of a miracle-working icon from the Church of Christ's Transfiguration on Bolshaya Ordynka Street, made in 1711 by the order of the sister of Peter the Great, the tsarevna Natalya Alekseyevna to commemorate the saving of the Russian army during the Prutskiy campaign in the Russo-Turkish War of 1710-1711. It was brought to the Transfiguration Cathedral in 1932 from the closed Church of Christ's Resurrection on Shalyernaya Street.

The cathedral houses the regimental relics, war trophies, and bronze wall plaques with the names of officers of the Preobrazhensky regiment fallen in battle. Under glass in separate cases are the Preobrazhensky uniforms of Alexander I, Nicholas I, and Alexander II, as well as a blood-stained saber that Alexander II was wearing during an attempt on his life on March 13, 1881 (March 1, O.S.).
