= Trezza =

Trezza is both a given name and an Italian surname. Notable people with the name include:

- Alex Trezza (born 1980), American college baseball coach
- Alfonso Trezza (born 1999), Uruguayan professional footballer
- Betty Trezza (1925–2007), American baseball player
- Trezza Azzopardi (born 1961), British writer

== See also ==
- Trezzi
