= Trezzano =

Trezzano may refer to:

- Trezzano sul Naviglio, a comune in the Metropolitan City of Milan in the Italian region Lombardy
- Trezzano Rosa, a comune in the Province of Milan in the Italian region Lombardy

== See also ==
- Trezzo (disambiguation)
