= Pietro Antonio Trezzini =

Swiss architect (1692 – after 1760)

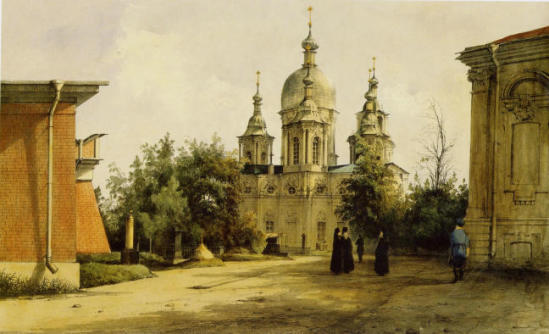
The Trinity Cathedral of Strelna Monastery was built to Trezzini's design under the supervision of his archrival, Bartolomeo Rastrelli

Pietro Antonio Trezzini (Russian: Пётр Трезин, romanized: Pyotr Trezin; 1692 – after 1760) was a Swiss architect from the Trezzini family who worked primarily in St. Petersburg. After several years of training in Milan, Trezzini arrived in St. Petersburg (1726), perhaps summoned by a relative, Domenico Trezzini.

Trezzini collaborated with Mikhail Zemtsov on several major projects, including the Feodorovskaya Church in the new part of the Alexander Nevsky Lavra. Trezzini's contributions to mid-18th century Russian architecture have been overshadowed by those of Bartolomeo Rastrelli. His name is associated with modest, one-domed Baroque churches, such as St. Sampson's Cathedral and the Prince Vladimir Church. Most of his buildings later gave way to grander Neoclassical edifices.

After completing the pentacupolar Transfiguration Church, Trezzini went on leave to Italy (1751) where he entered the service of the Habsburgs. He is last mentioned as living in St. Petersburg in 1760. St. Clement's Church in Moscow and Vladimirskaya Church in St. Petersburg are frequently cited as his last major commissions.
