= St Clement's Church, Moscow =

Orthodox church in Moscow

Coordinates: 55°44′27″N 37°37′44″E

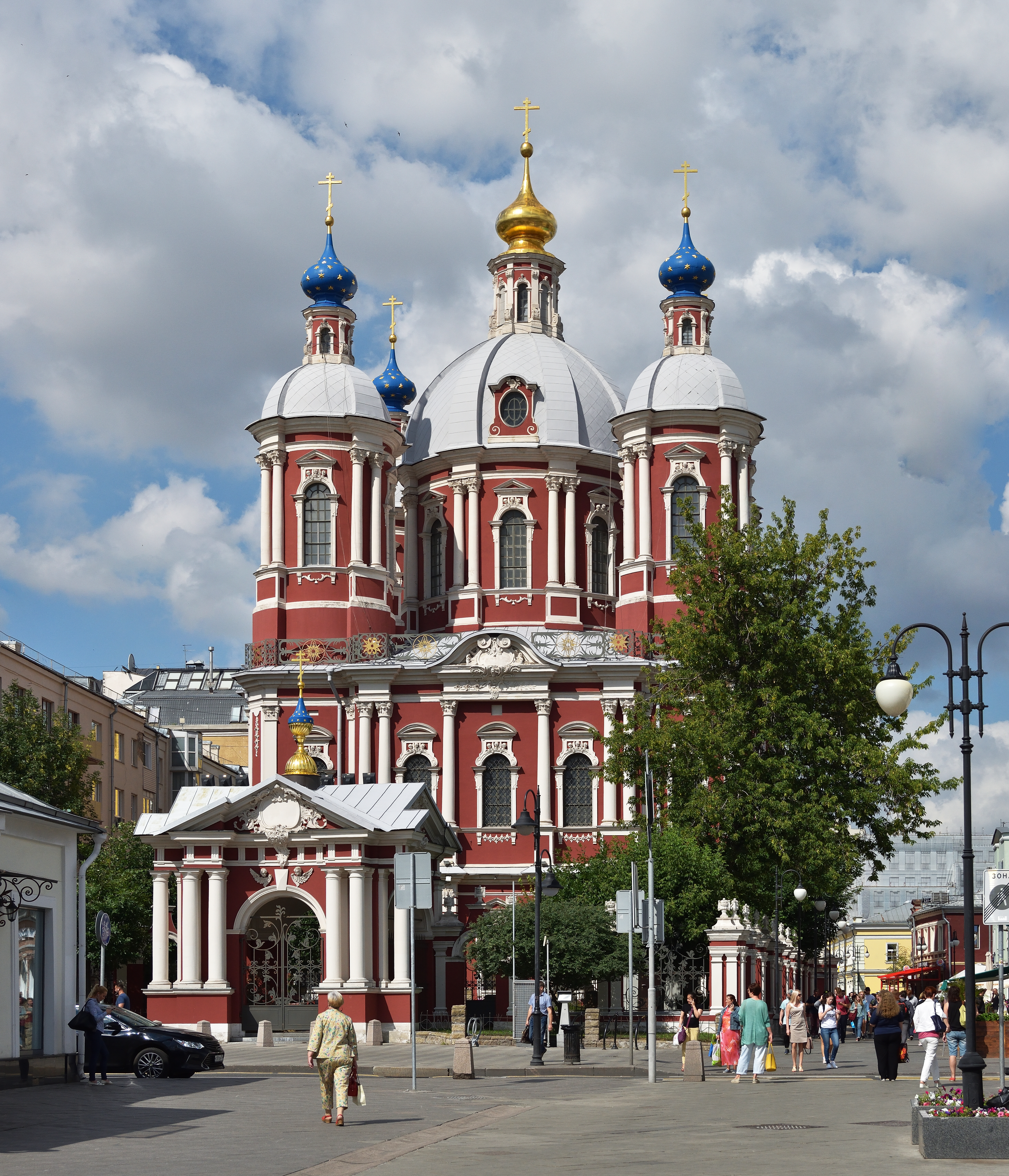
St Clement's Church in Moscow

St. Clement's Church (Храм Священномученика Климента, Папы Римского) is one of the two Orthodox churches in Moscow dedicated to a Roman Pope, St. Clement I. The massive five-domed two-storey church used to dominate the skyline of Zamoskvorechye. It was built between 1762 and 1769 on the site of a church erected in 1720.

The church is considered a major example of Elizabethan Baroque, but the architect is unknown. It has been often attributed to Pietro Antonio Trezzini, the architect of St Sampson's Cathedral in St. Petersburg. The belfry and refectory were designed by Dmitry Ukhtomsky and built in 1756—1758.

The church is renowned for its glittering Baroque interior and iconostasis, as well as a set of gilded 18th-century railings. The parish was disbanded in 1934 and the original free-standing gate was demolished. The Lenin State Library stored its books in the building throughout the Soviet period. It was not until 2008 that the building reverted to the Russian Orthodox Church.

== Sources ==
- Murzin-Gundorov, V. V. (2012). Дмитрий Ухтомский [Dmitry Ukhtomsky] (in Russian). Moscow: Rudentsov Publishing House. p. 147-155. ISBN 978-5-902887-11-9.
- Mikhailov, A. I. (1954). Архитектор Д. В. Ухтомский и его школа [Architect Dmitry Ukhtomsky and His School] (in Russian). Moscow: Gosstroiizdat. p. 83-84.
