= Trezzi =

Trezzi is an Italian surname. Notable people with the surname include:

- Carlo Raffaele Trezzi (born 1982), Italian footballer
- Fabrizio Trezzi (born 1967), Italian cyclist
- Nicola Trezzi (born 1982), Italian-born editor, educator, writer and exhibition maker

== See also ==
- Trezza
- Trezzini
