= Gaetano Chiaveri =

Italian architect (c. 1689 – 1770)

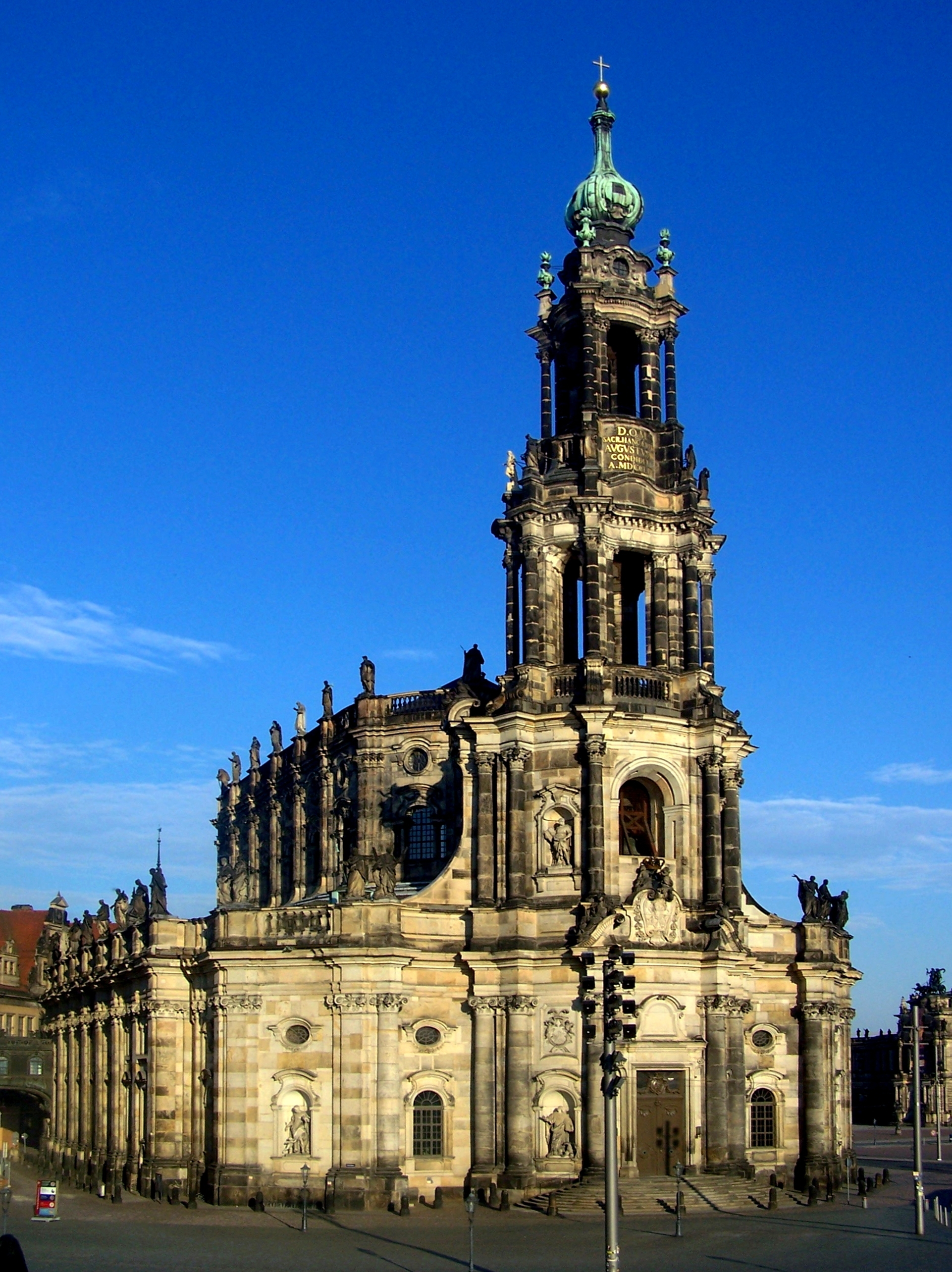
- Dresden Cathedral
- Born: c. 1689; Rome, Papal States
- Died: 5 March 1770 (aged 80–81); Foligno, Papal States
- Occupation: Architect
- Movement: Baroque
- Practice: Nicola Michetti
- Buildings: Kadriorg Palace; Dresden Cathedral

Gaetano Chiaveri (c. 1689 in Rome – 5 March 1770) was an Italian architect and master builder, most notable for his work as part of the second phase of the Dresden Baroque. His works include the Cathedral in Dresden and a new wing of the Royal Castle in Warsaw.

== Biography ==
Gaetano Chiaveri was born in Rome in 1689 into a family of Lombard merchants. He probably studied architecture under Nicola Michetti, a pupil of Carlo Fontana. In 1717, Chiaveri moved to St. Petersburg, where he worked with Michetti on Peter the Great's palace at Strelna and the Kronstadt Fortress on Kotlin Island. Between 1718 and 1725, he oversaw the construction of Kadriorg Palace to Michetti's designs. In 1720 Chiaveri was appointed a member of the Imperial Chancellery of Building.

Following the death of the Swiss architect Nicolaus Friedrich Härbel in 1724, Chiaveri completed the construction projects that Härbel had left unfinished in St. Petersburg. These included the palace of Tsar Ivan V’s widow, Praskovia Saltykova, which became the seat of the Russian Academy of Sciences in 1725. Chiaveri also completed Georg Johann Mattarnovi’s Kunstkamera, a museum and library inaugurated by Peter the Great on Vasilyevsky Island.

In 1727, Chiaveri relocated to Warsaw to design a palace for Jacob Heinrich von Flemming. However, this project was cut short by the death of his patron the following year. Between 1734 and 1737, he played a major role in the remodelling of the Royal Castle. His design included the reconstruction of the castle's façade on the Vistula side and the addition of the Baroque easternmost wing of the complex, which was completed in 1747 by Carl Friedrich Pöppelmann and Johann Christoph Knöffel.

In the 1730s, Chiaveri entered the service of the Electorate of Saxony. In 1734, he accompanied Augustus III to his coronation as King of Poland in Kraków. In 1737, Augustus III appointed him "Chief Master Builder" (Oberlandbaumeister). In this role, he directed public works, managed state construction projects and oversaw architectural designs for the royal court. From 1 April 1736 to 30 September 1749, Chiaveri directed the construction of the Dresden Cathedral, widely considered his masterpiece. Many Italian craftsmen arrived in Dresden during this period, establishing the settlement known as the 'Italian Village' (Italienisches Dörfchen). Chiaveri left Dresden before the church was completed, and it was ultimately finished in 1755 under the direction of Johann Christoph Knöffel and Julius Schwarze.

Upon returning to Italy, Chiaveri settled in his native Rome, where he was appointed a member of the Accademia di San Luca on 4 October 1746. At the beginning of the 1760s, he hosted Marco Benefial and the Bavarian sculptor Dominik Auliczek, who studied architecture with him for three years before settling in Munich in 1763. In 1766, he settled in Foligno, where he died on 5 March 1770.

== Bibliography ==
- Wishnevsky, Rose (1980). "CHIAVERI, Gaetano". Dizionario Biografico degli Italiani (in Italian). Vol. 24: Cerreto–Chini. Rome: Istituto dell'Enciclopedia Italiana. ISBN 978-88-12-00032-6.
- Rottermund, Andrzej (2003). "Chiaveri, Gaetano". Grove Art Online. Oxford University Press. doi:10.1093/gao/9781884446054.article.T016405.
