= Kadriorg Palace =

Palace in Tallinn

Coordinates: 59°26′19″N 24°47′27″E

- Kadrioru loss

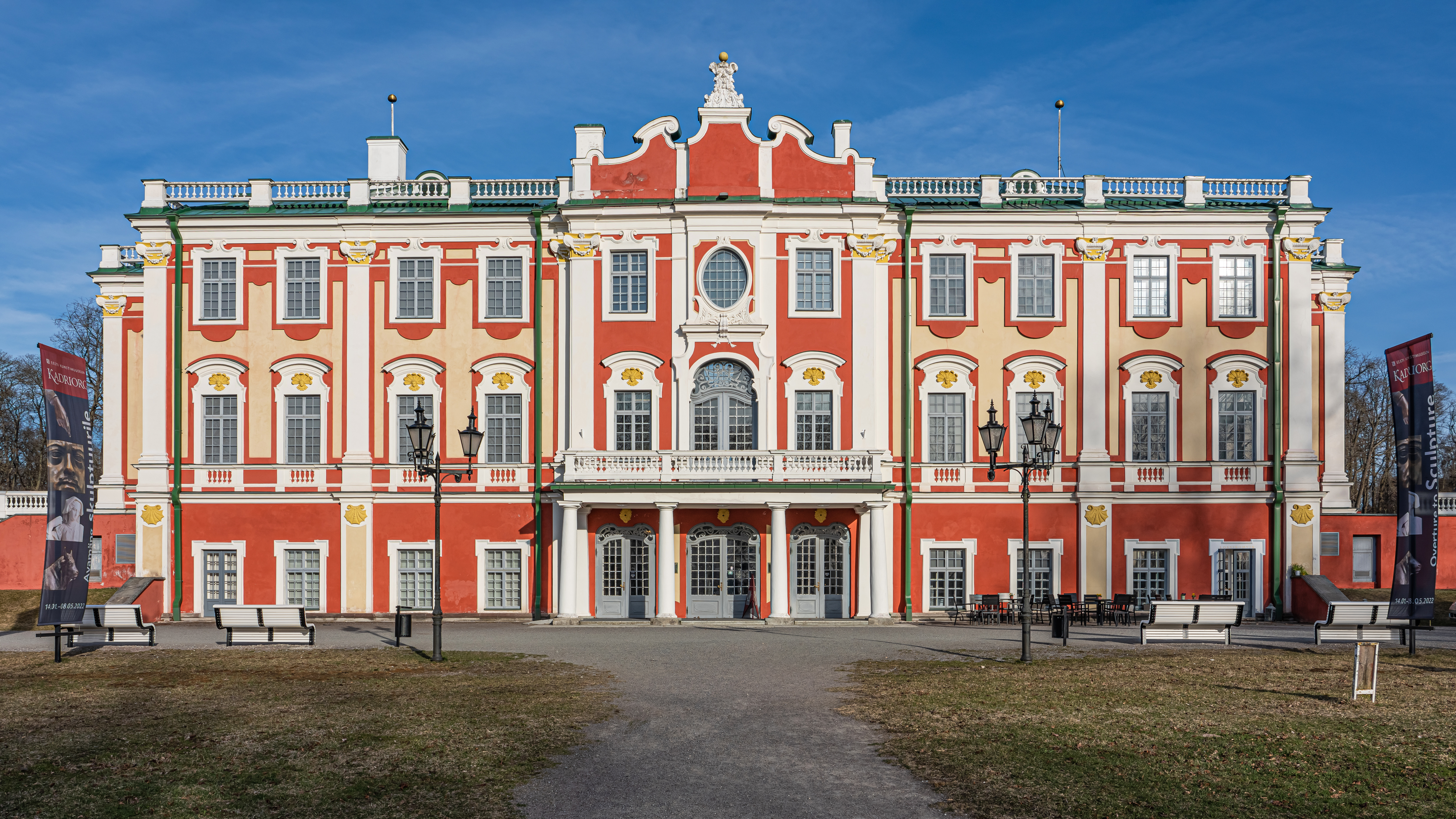
- Kadriorg Palace in Tallinn
- Interactive map of the Kadriorg Palace area

General information
- Architectural style: Petrine Baroque
- Location: Tallinn, Estonia
- Construction started: 1718
- Completed: 1725
- Client: Peter the Great

Design and construction
- Architects: Nicola Michetti; Gaetano Chiaveri; Mikhail Zemtsov

Kadriorg Palace (Estonian: Kadrioru loss, German: Schloss Katharinental) is an 18th-century Petrine Baroque palace in Kadriorg, Tallinn, the capital of Estonia. Both the Estonian and the German names for the palace mean "Catherine's valley". It was built in 1718–1725 to Nicola Michetti's designs by Gaetano Chiaveri and Mikhail Zemtsov. The palace currently houses the Kadriorg Art Museum, a branch of the Art Museum of Estonia, displaying foreign art from the 16th to 20th centuries. The building of the Kumu branch of the museum, showing Estonian art from the 18th century onwards, is located nearby in the Kadriorg Park.

== Construction ==
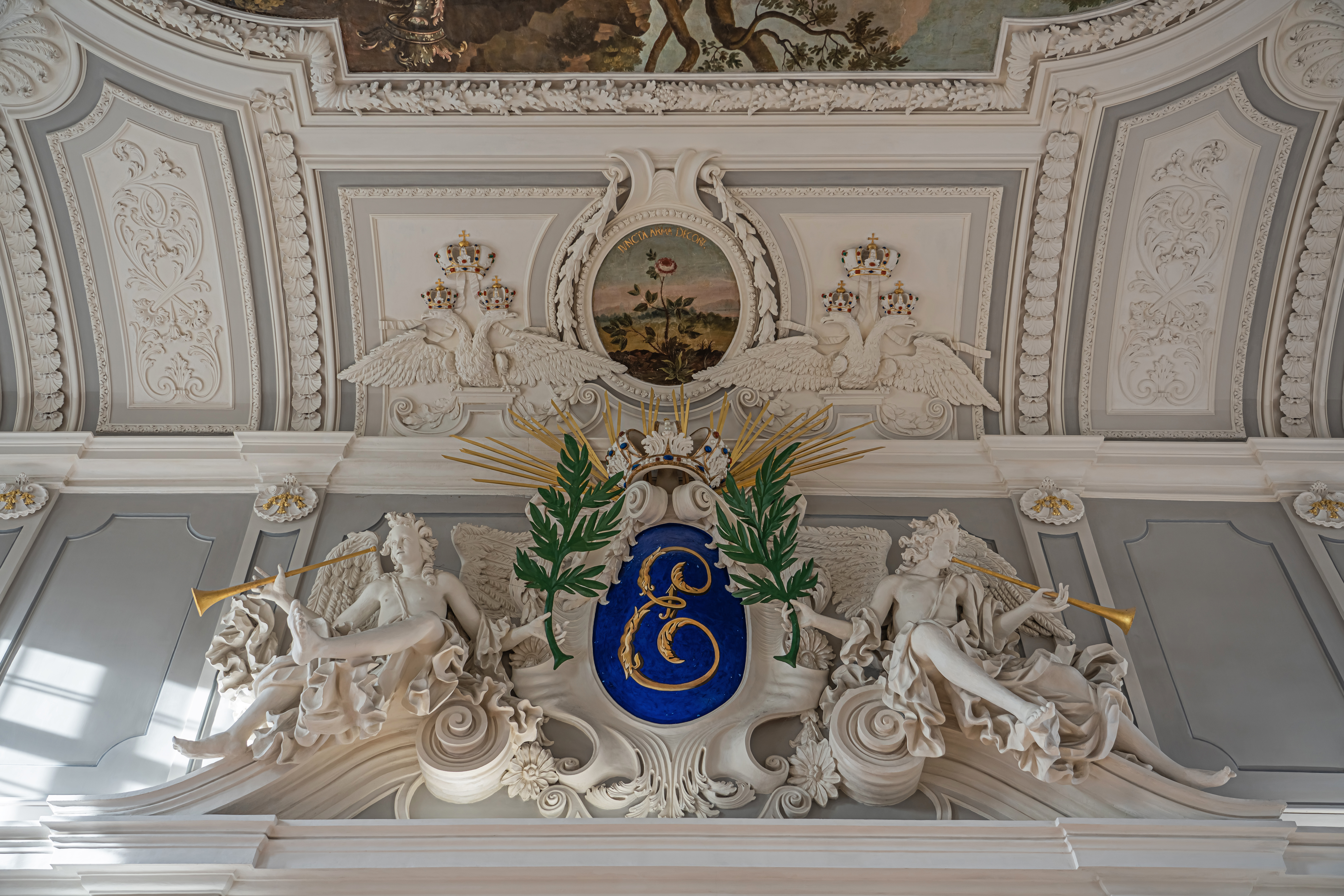
Stucco decoration with Catherine's initials in the great hall of the palace

After the successful 1710 siege of Reval (Tallinn) during the Great Northern War, Czar Peter the Great of Russia bought a small manor house at Laksberg (Lasnamäe) for his wife Catherine. Plans for a larger palace in the area were developed soon afterwards and construction of a new palace, in what is now Kadriorg, was started on 25 July 1718. The construction of the main building of the palace was completed by 1725. Peter the Great and Catherine visited the unfinished residence on several occasions, but after his death in 1725 Catherine showed no interest in the seaside property. The great hall with Catherine's initials and profuse stucco decor (attributed to Heinrich von Bergen) survives, while many other interiors have been altered.

The gardener Ilya Surmin was responsible for the flower garden with two fountains and the so-called mirage garden on several levels. The layout of the park shares similarities with that of the palace of Peter the Great in Strelna.

== Restoration ==
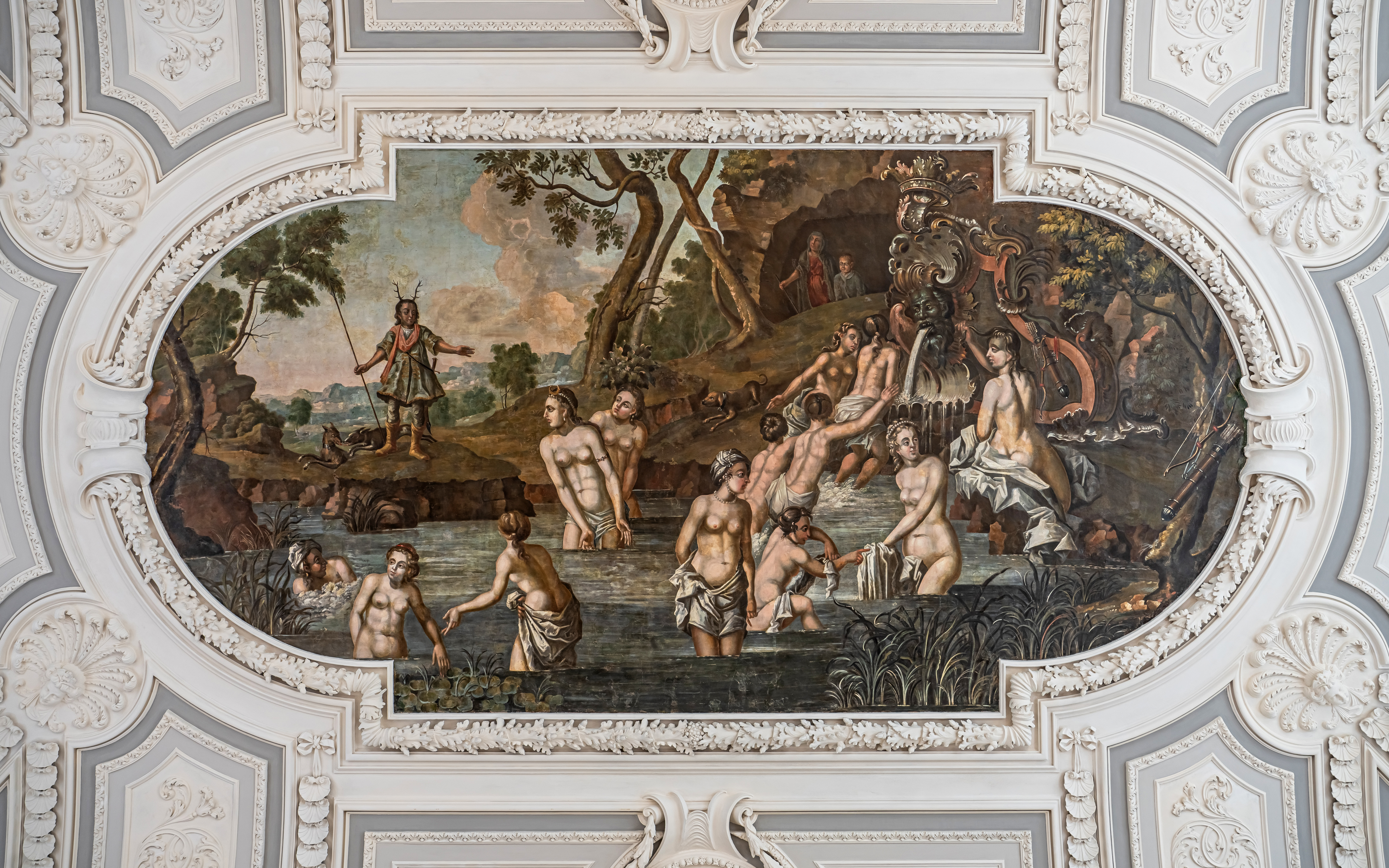
Ceiling fresco in the great hall

After the death of Peter the Great, the palace received little attention from the Russian royal family. It was sporadically visited, by the Empress Elisabeth and Catherine the Great. In 1828-1830 extensive restoration works of the palace and grounds took place. Between 1741 and 1917, the palace also housed the civilian governor of the Governorate of Estonia.

After Estonia became an independent country in 1918, the palace became state property. For a time, one of the wings housed the studio of sculptor August Weizenberg while the palace was used for art exhibitions. Between 1921 and 1928 the palace housed what would eventually develop into the Art Museum of Estonia. In 1929, in connection with a state visit by King Gustaf V of Sweden, the palace was turned into a summer residence for the head of state of Estonia. In 1934, the palace became the official residence of the then head of state, Konstantin Päts who embarked on extensive and controversial restoration works with the aim of transforming the park and the palace into his private domain. From this era, the library in elaborate "Danzig-baroque" style, completed by architect Olev Siinmaa in 1939 is worth mentioning. A purpose-built presidential palace on the grounds (1938) was designed by Alar Kotli.

In 1921, the palace became the main site for the Art Museum of Estonia. The museum was rehoused in temporary locations from 1929 while the palace was being converted into the Estonian head of state's official residence. During the German occupation of Estonia during World War II, the palace was the residence of the civilian governor of occupied Estonia, Karl-Siegmund Litzmann. After 1944, during the Soviet occupation of Estonia, the palace once again became the main venue for the Art Museum of Estonia, although the buildings were neglected and by the time of the restoration of Estonia's independence in 1991, completely run down. Restoration works, supported by the government of Sweden, began in 1991, and the palace was reopened to the public in 2000. It was also decided that a new building would be established nearby for the section of the museum devoted to Estonian art.

The restored palace was reopened in the summer of 2000, but it no longer serves as the main building of the museum, but as a branch displaying the museum's collection of foreign art. This art museum has paintings by Bartholomeus van der Helst, Gillis van Valckenborch ("Burning of Troy"), Jacob Jordaens ("Holy Family"), Lambert de Hondt the Elder, Adriaen Cornelisz Beeldemaker ("Hunter on Horseback"), Maria Dorothea Wagner, Julie Wilhelmine Hagen-Schwarz, Bernardo Strozzi, Pietro Liberi, Anton Graff, Angelica Kauffman, Francesco Fontebasso, Cornelis Schut, Mikhail Clodt, and Ilya Repin ("Soldier's Tale").

== Gallery ==
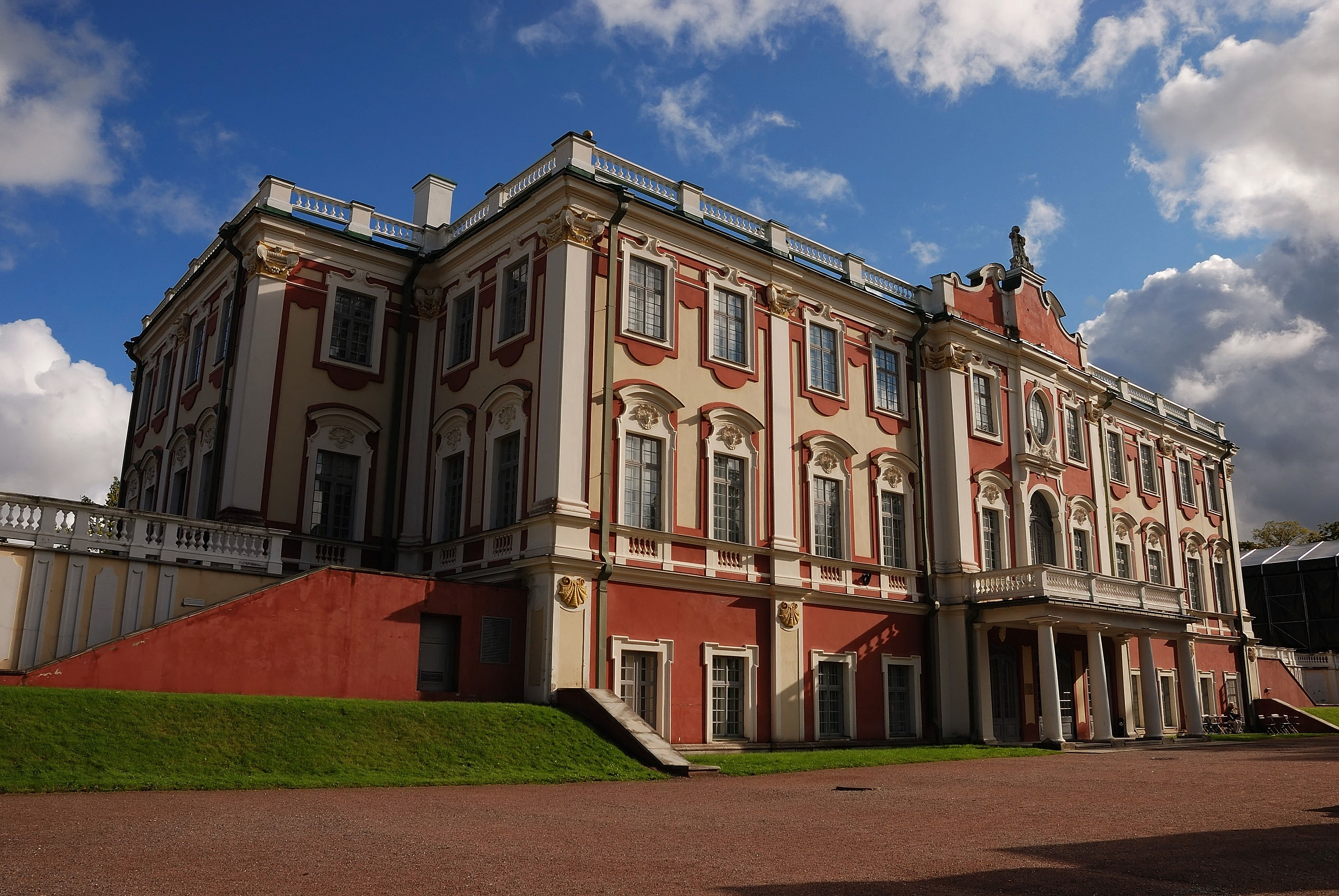
The front façade during sunset

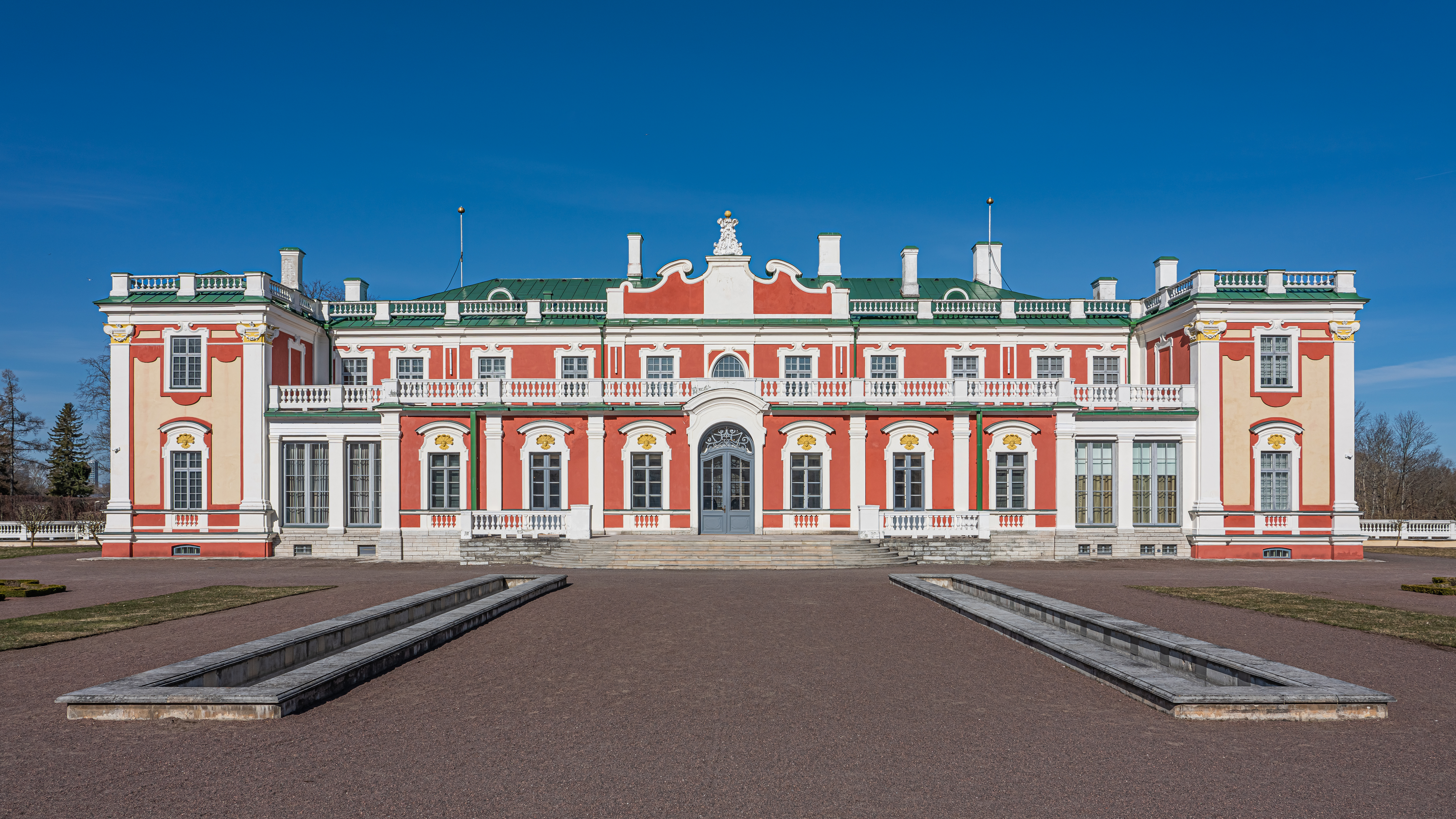
The rear façade

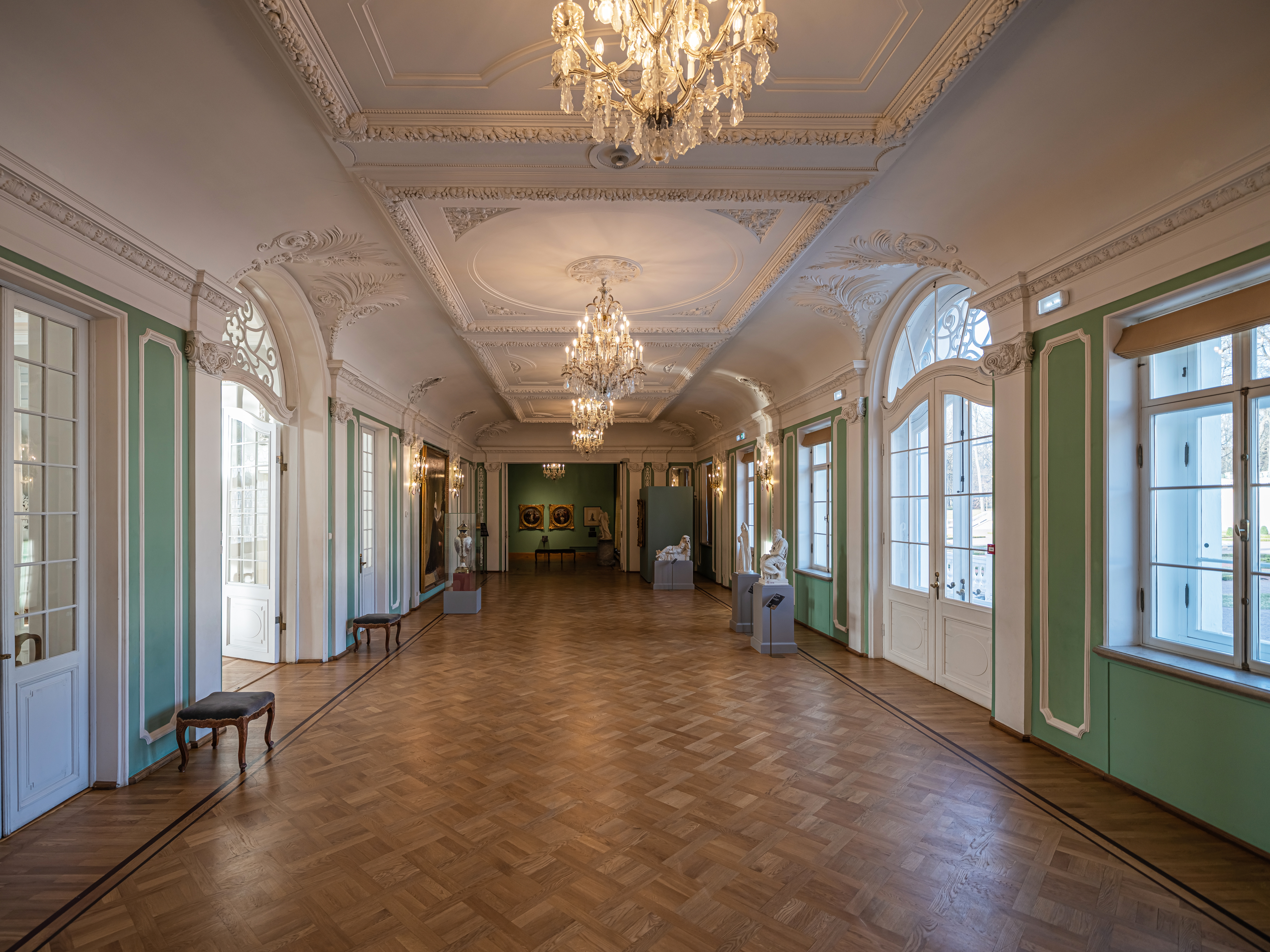
From the interior

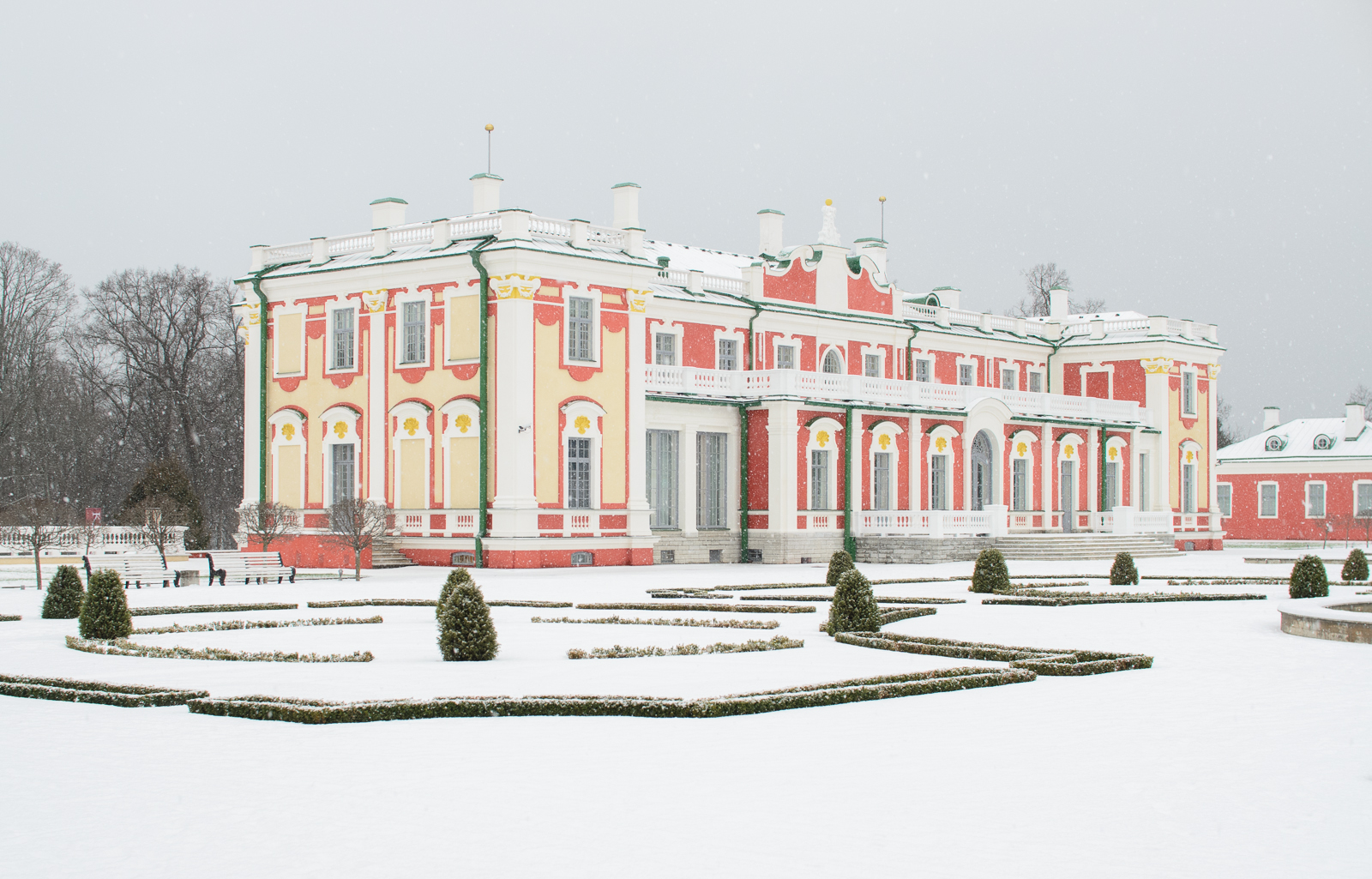
The palace in winter

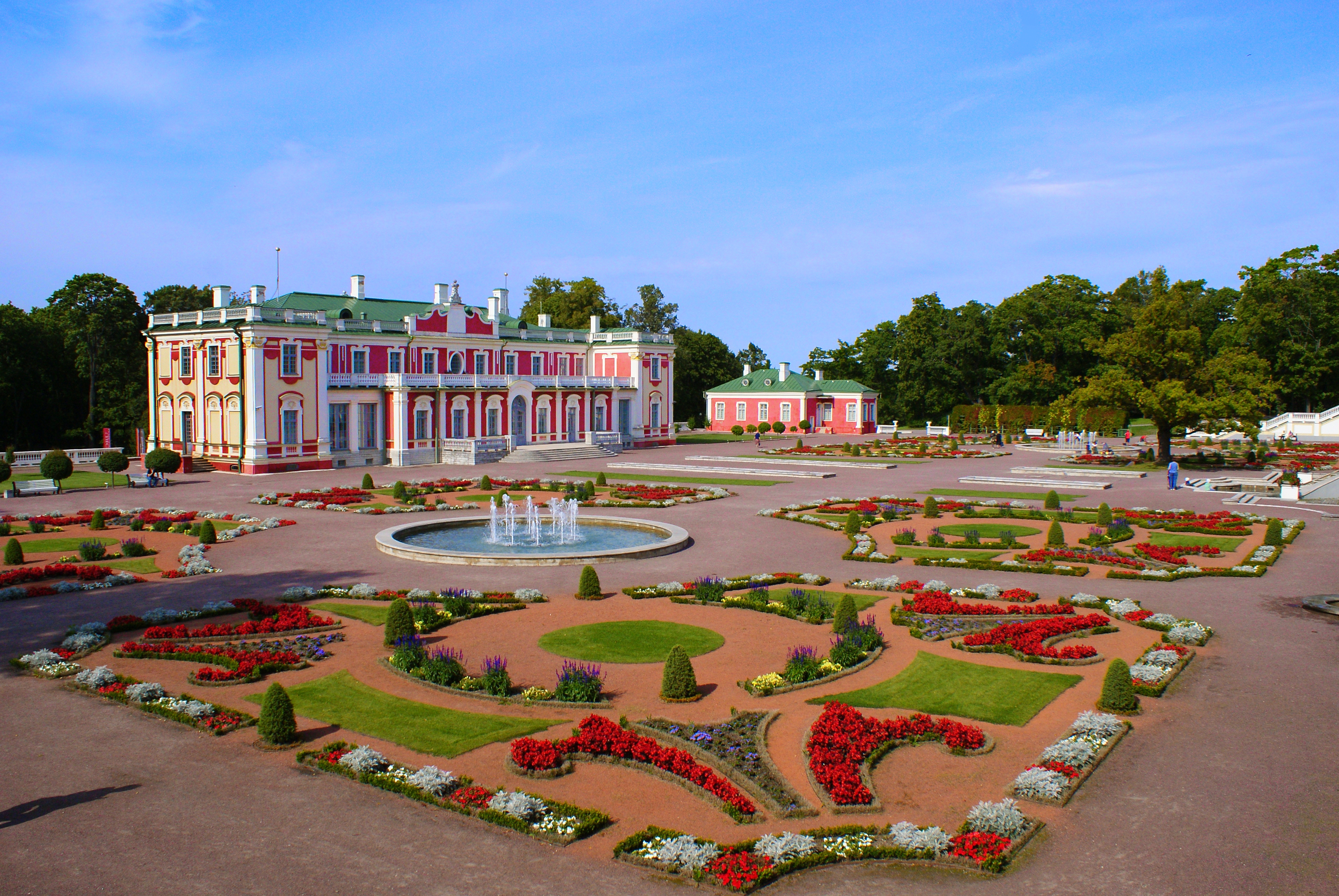
The palace grounds

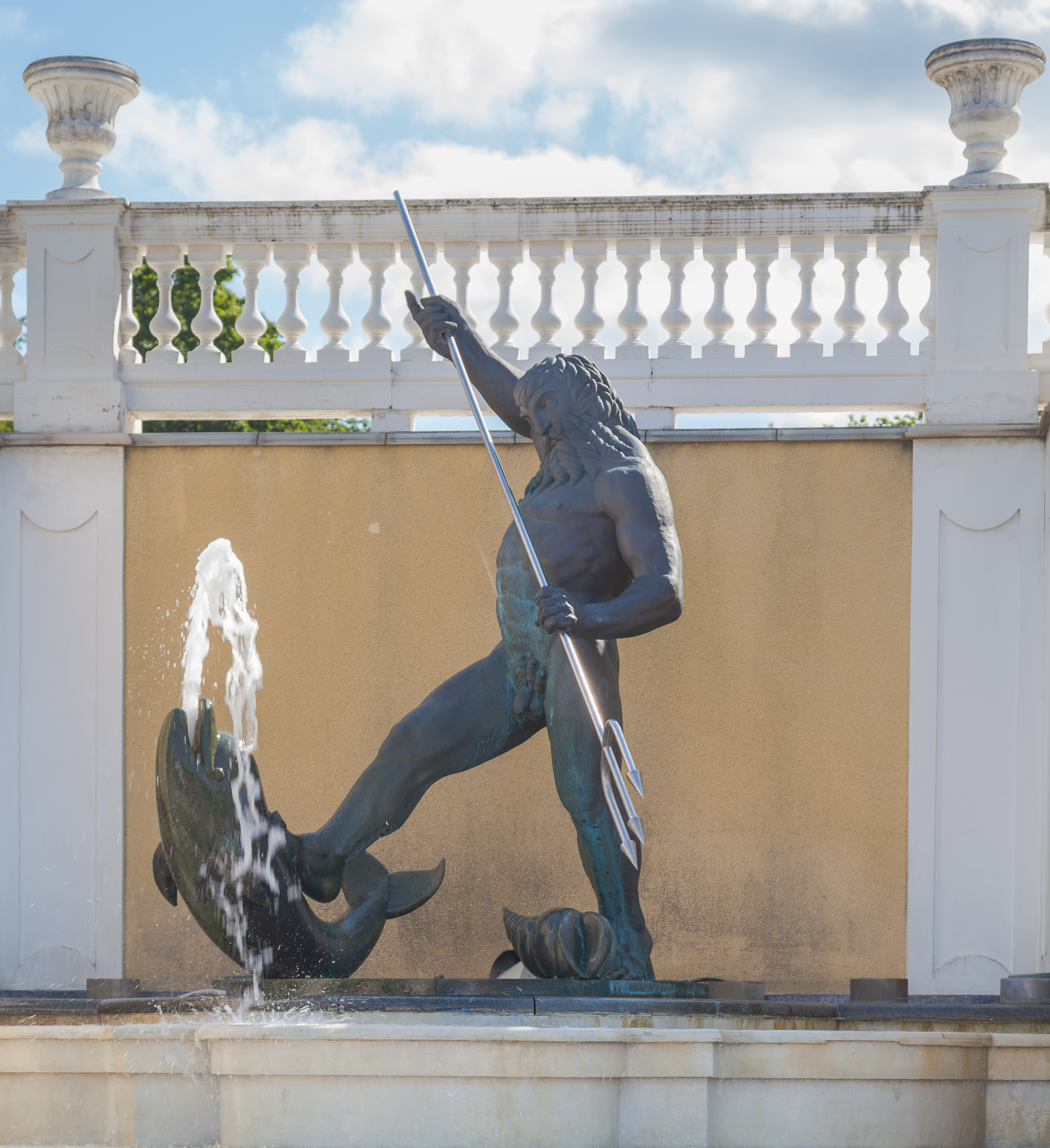
Poseidon fountains in the garden

== See also ==
- List of Baroque residences
- Culture of Estonia
- List of palaces and manor houses in Estonia
