= Zemtsov =

Zemtsov may refer to:

- Mikhail Zemtsov (1688-1743), Russian architect
- 25094 Zemtsov, an asteroid
