= Summer Palace of Peter the Great =

Russian imperial palace

Coordinates: 59°56′50″N 30°20′10″E

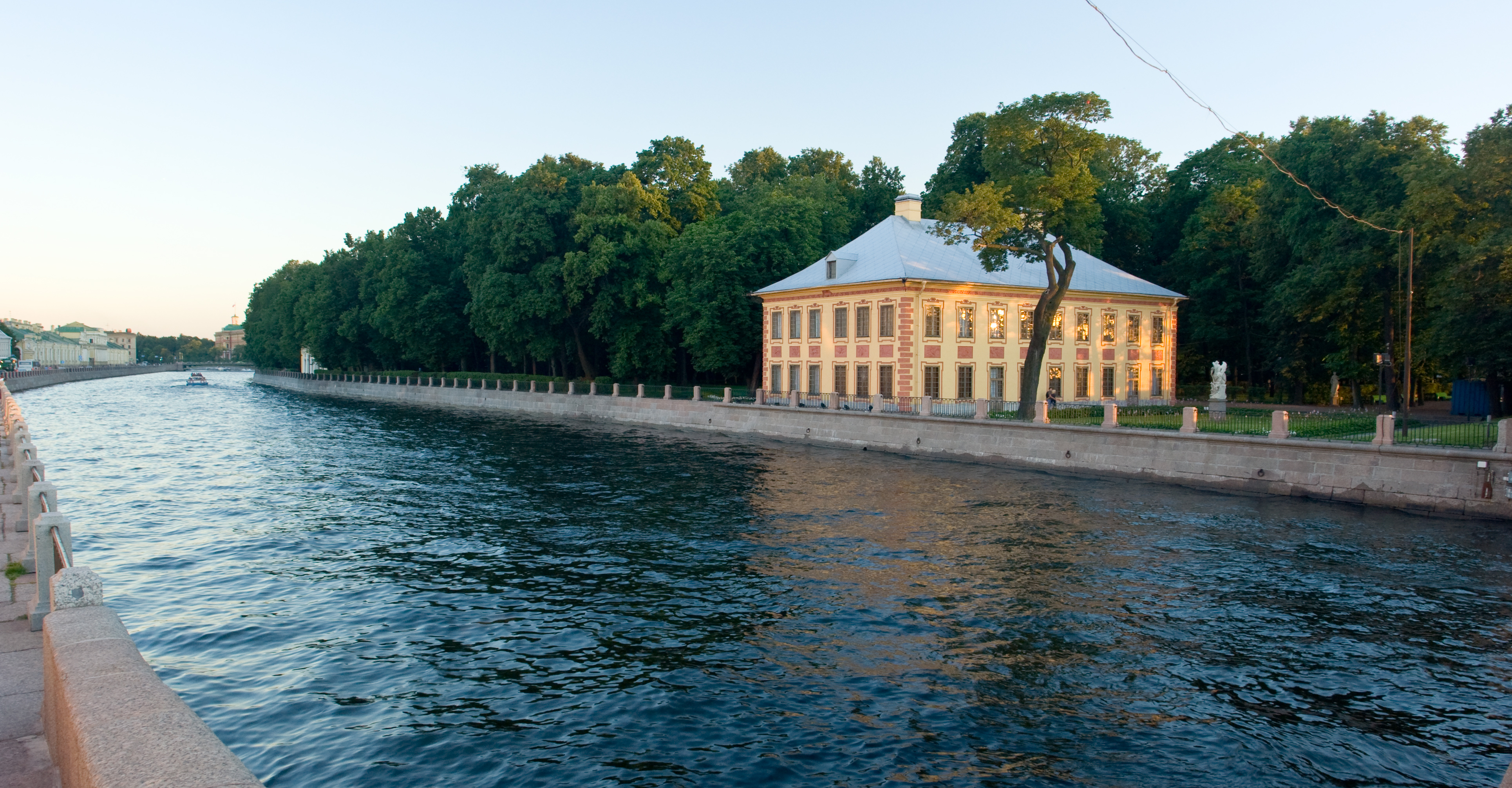
The palace as seen from across the Fontanka River from a small Prachechniy ("Laundry") Bridge in August 2007

The Summer Palace of Peter the Great (Russian: Летний дворец Петра I) was built in Saint Petersburg between 1710 and 1714 in the northeast corner of the Summer Garden, located on an island formed by the Fontanka River, Moyka River, and the Swan Canal. Its northern perimeter runs along the left bank of the Neva River across from the Cabin of Peter the Great and Peter and Paul Fortress and was the first palace built in Saint Petersburg, the second largest city in Russia.

The building is currently a museum. It is open to visitors and has been recreated to bring out in essence its features as it existed at the time of Peter the Great.

== Construction ==
The Summer Palace was planned in 1710, at a vantage location on the bank of the Fontanka River, by Peter the Great, the first Russian Emperor, the Russian Tsar. The palace was designed by the Swiss Italian architect Domenico Trezzini, who elaborated on the Petrine Baroque style of Russian architecture with a two-story stone building with four-slope roofing. It has a charming exterior and utilitarian rich interior, comparatively a small double storeyed stone building built to the liking of Peter the Great at St. Petersburg.

Compared with other European palaces of the time the Summer Palace was a very modest building, reminiscent of the style of houses for Dutch Burghers from the same period. During its construction, the Summer Palace was decorated with friezes of 28 bas-reliefs by the German baroque sculptor and architect Andreas Schlüter depicting scenes from ancient myths and victorious Russian battles in the Great Northern War. The bas-reliefs underline the theme of Russia's marine power. The doorway also has a bas-releff of Minerva with trophy. There is also a centrally located copper statue of St. George armed with a spear, under the iron roof. The iron roof has a drainage arrangement with each corner shaped like a dragon. Red bas-reliefs below the window skirt the exterior faces all round the building.

The Summer Palace's two floors had similar floor plans, with seven rooms on each. They were decorated by Russian architect Mikhail Zemtsov, German baroque sculptor and architect Andreas Schlüter, and Italian architect Nicola Michetti. Most of the rooms had walls of red and green and oak panels, and an innovative central heating system that featured solid fuel burning boilers with elaborate blue and white porcelain ductwork.

Of the rooms to be noted are the reception room; the assembly room (grand hall); the jail where Peter personally prosecuted, imprisoned, and released prisoners; and Peter's favorite room, his workshop.

The construction of the Summer Palace was completed in 1714. The water supply system to the palace was from a dam built across the Fontana River, which fed the fountains in the precincts of the palace. The palace also boasted of the first sewage system built by the engineer Jean-Baptiste Le Blond; Blond had also built a running water connection from a fountain to the kitchen and the bathroom.

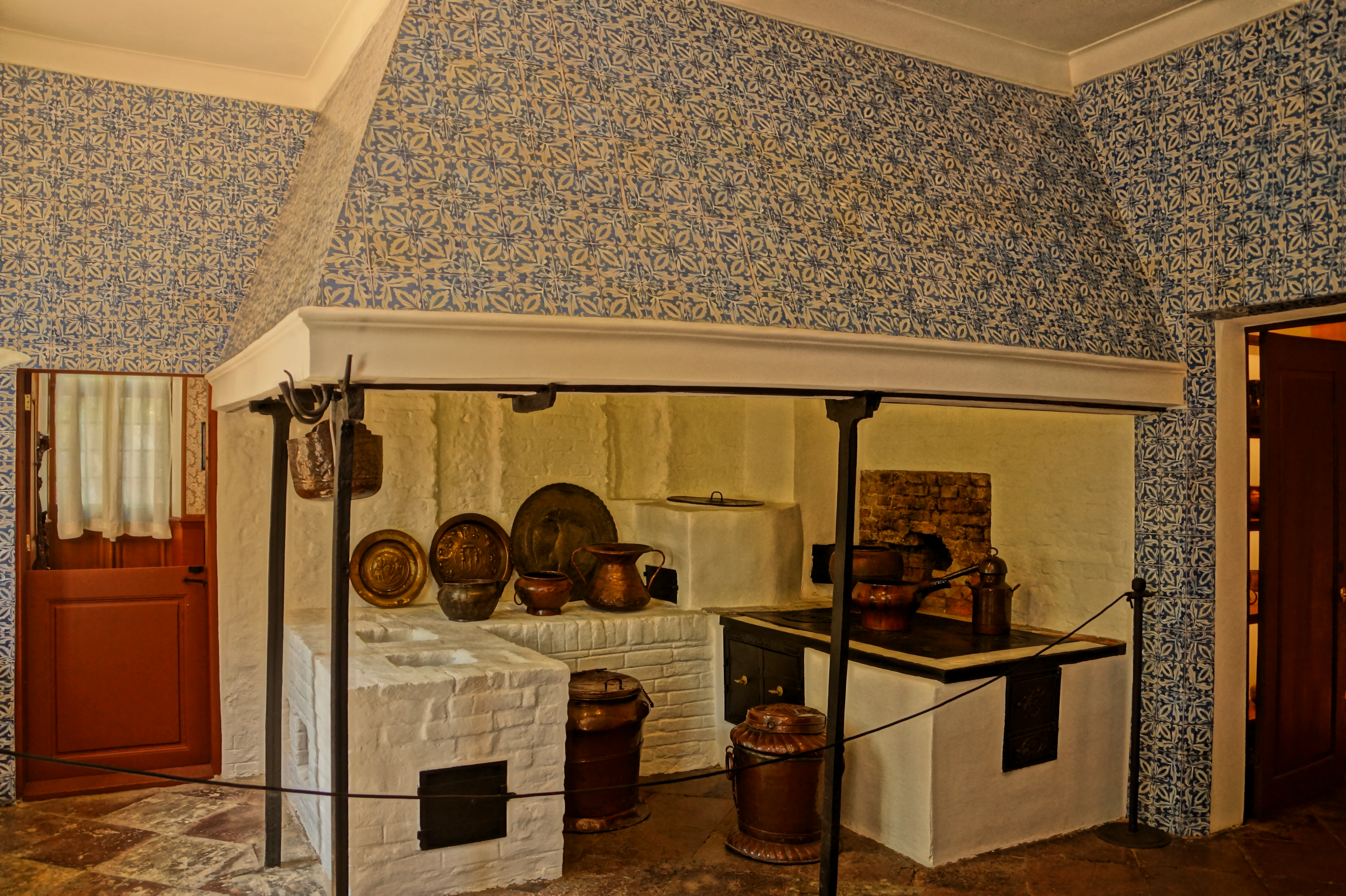
Summer palace, kitchen with tiles (interior)

The Palace was built around the Summer Gardens (established in 1704), which have been beautified with renaissance era statues made of marble which were brought from Italy by Peter the Great. This garden, enclosed by a wrought iron fence was built before the palace as a celebration to mark the victory of Russia over Sweden, and is credited to architects, Ivan Matveev-Ugryumov and Jan Baptiste Le Blond. The curators of the garden were Russian gardeners Yan Roozin and Ivan Surmin. It has benches and side walks where Peter the Great used to spend his summer afternoons. Garden's hedge and with the fable fountains, the Summer Gardens became integral to the Summer Palace. A statue of Venus which was in the Grotto pavilion of the garden was moved to the Tauride Palace at the beginning of the 19th century. Situated on the bank of the Fontanka River, the palace and the garden were approached by boat for which a jetty was built. Historically, numerous monuments in the Summer Garden honour the victories of the Russian Empire in the Great Northern War.p.227

== Residence and other uses ==
When the Summer Palace was completed in 1714, it became the residence of Peter the Great and his second wife Catherine I of Russia and many of their 12 children; with Peter occupying the first floor and Catherine, along with the children, occupying the second one, until Peter's death in 1725. Peter and his wife Catherine used to live in the palace during summer, from May to October, and hold parties entertaining guests from foreign lands. Peter also used this palace on his way coming and going from Europe through the harbour and island fortress at Kronstadt.

=== Residence for Russian imperial family ===
After Peter the Great's death, the Summer Palace once held a Supreme Privy Council meeting but was otherwise occupied for several years by members of the imperial family and their courtiers.

During part of the 1762–1796 reign of Catherine the Great, the interior of the Summer Palace was altered for its use by court officials during the summer months.

In 1826, the Italian architect Carlo Rossi turned it into the Coffee House, but by the end of the 19th century, it had become vacant.

== Museum ==
After 1917, the palace was preserved as a historical and architectural monument but did not have a museum status. In 1925, the palace was handed over to the department of history and living environment of the State Russian Museum. Being used only for a small number of exhibitions during the early 20th century, in 1934 the Summer Palace was turned into a museum featuring the daily life of Peter the Great with the original oak staircase surviving as well as the upper and lower kitchens, along with Catherine's apartments on the upper floor that include the Green Drawing Room. The Summer Palace Museum has been a part of the State Russian Museum since 2004.

During World War II, both the Summer Palace and Summer Gardens were badly damaged by a German bombing raid. The building was repaired, however, and the layout remains unchanged from the original.

In the early 1960s, the Summer Palace was fully restored, including its interiors, the carved oak panels in the lower lobby with images of Minerva, the unique Dutch tiles for its heating system, and the fireplaces with stucco decorations. Reconstruction was supervised by architect A. E. Gessen.

The current Summer Palace of Peter the Great Museum gives visitors an opportunity to see Russian imperial court life from 300 years ago. Exhibits include paintings, prints, and the clothes and furniture of Peter the Great. Opening hours from June to October daily start at 10:00 (10 a.m.) and last to 18:00 (6 p.m.).

== Gallery ==
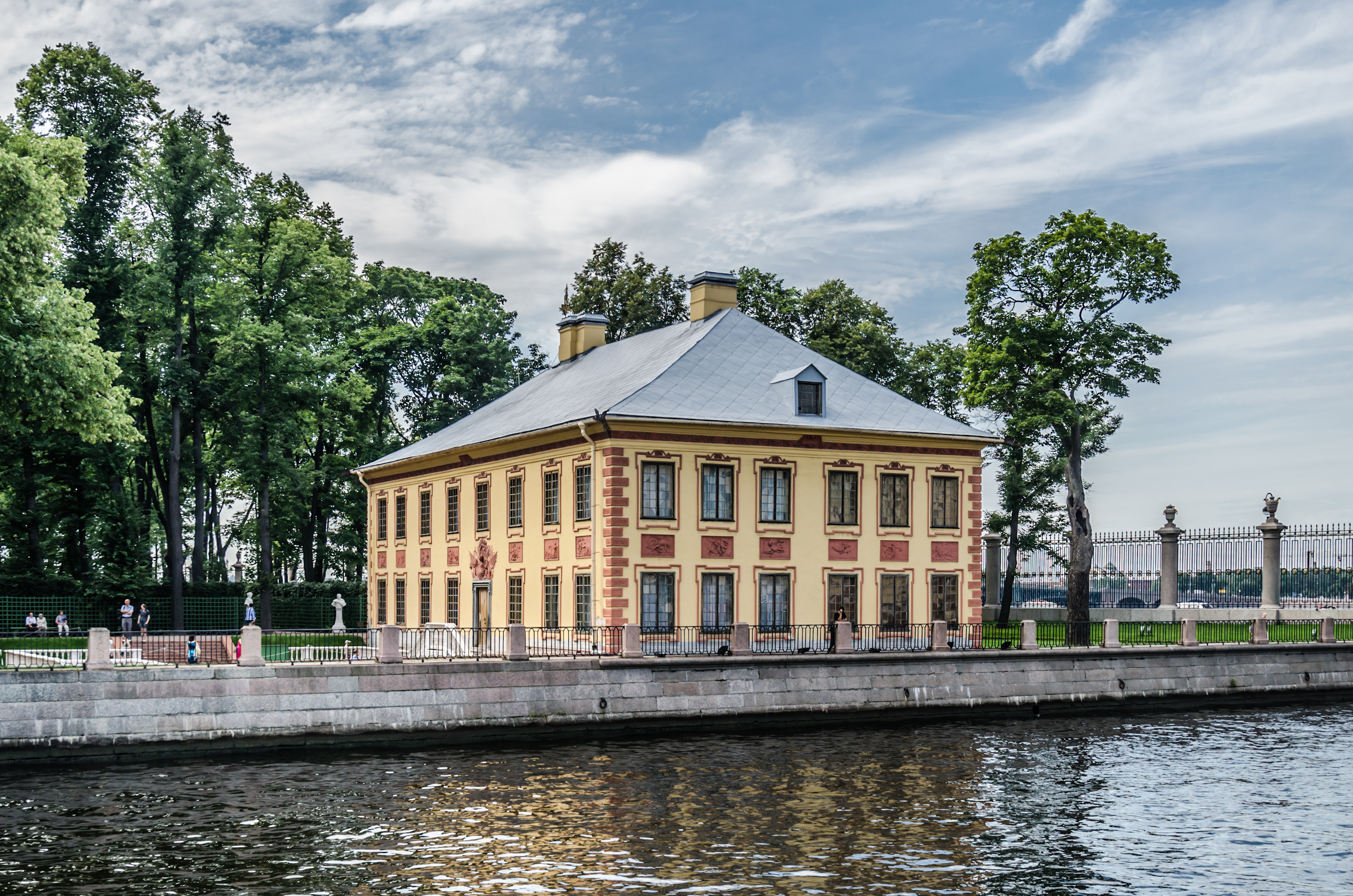
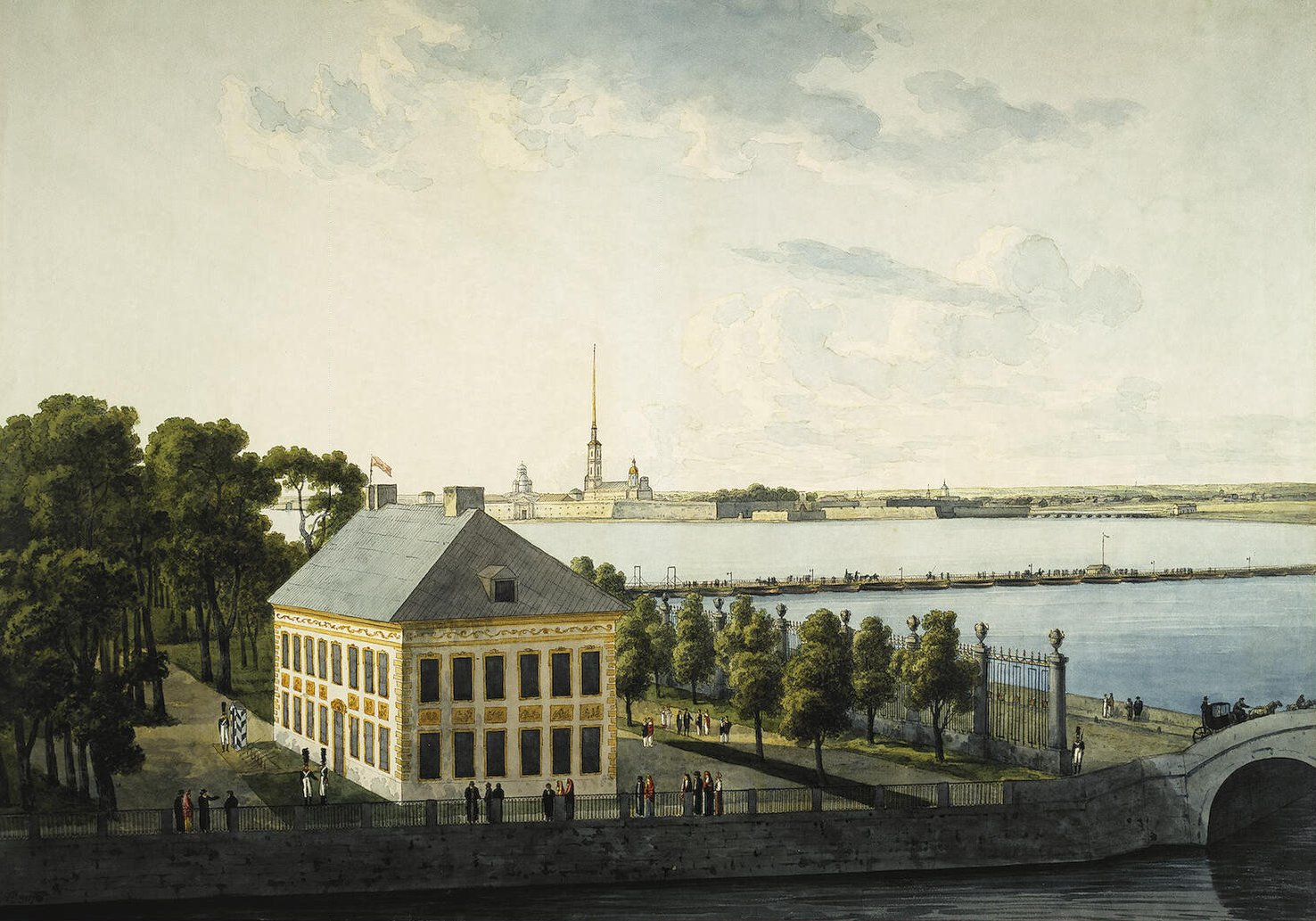
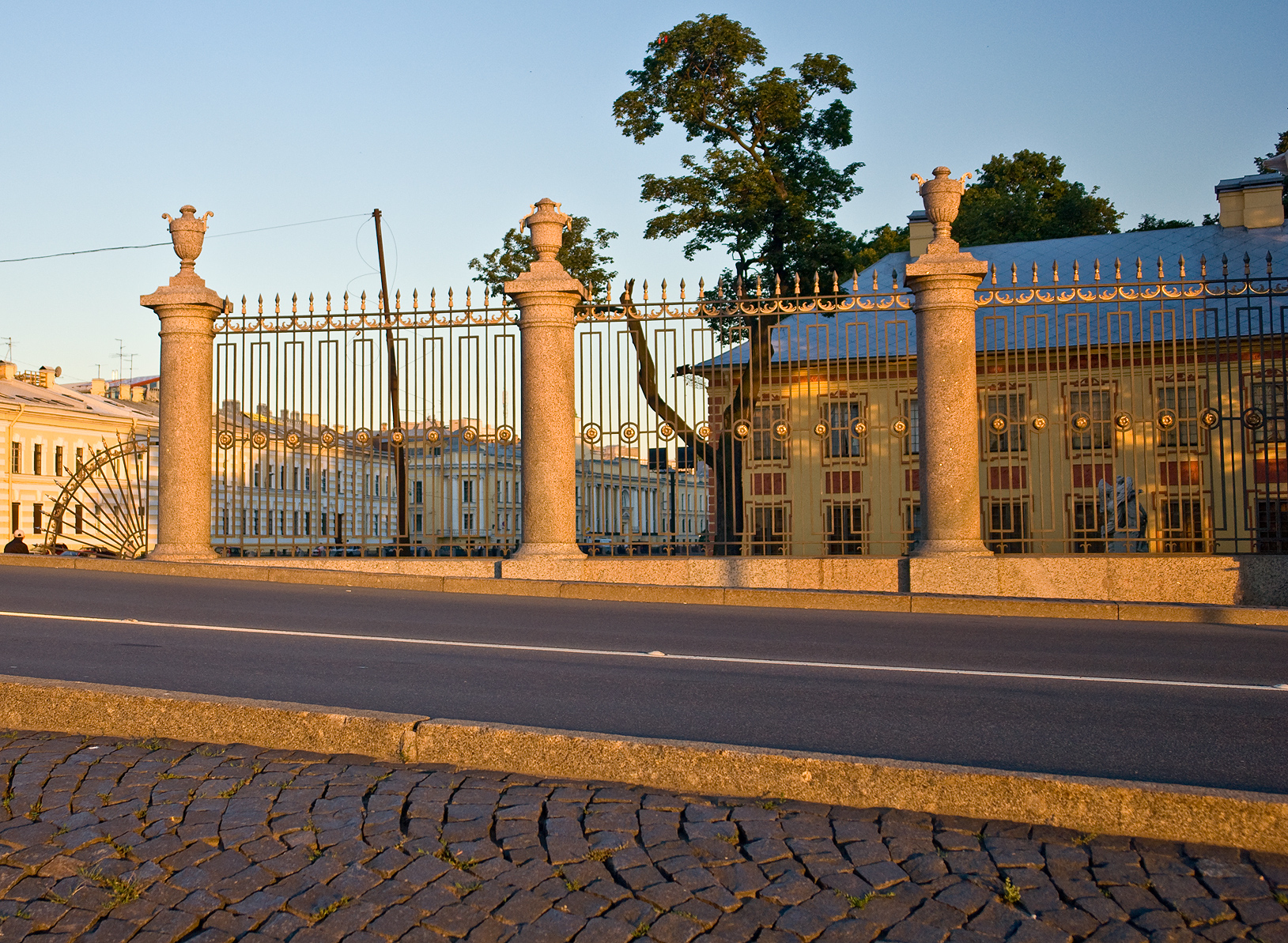
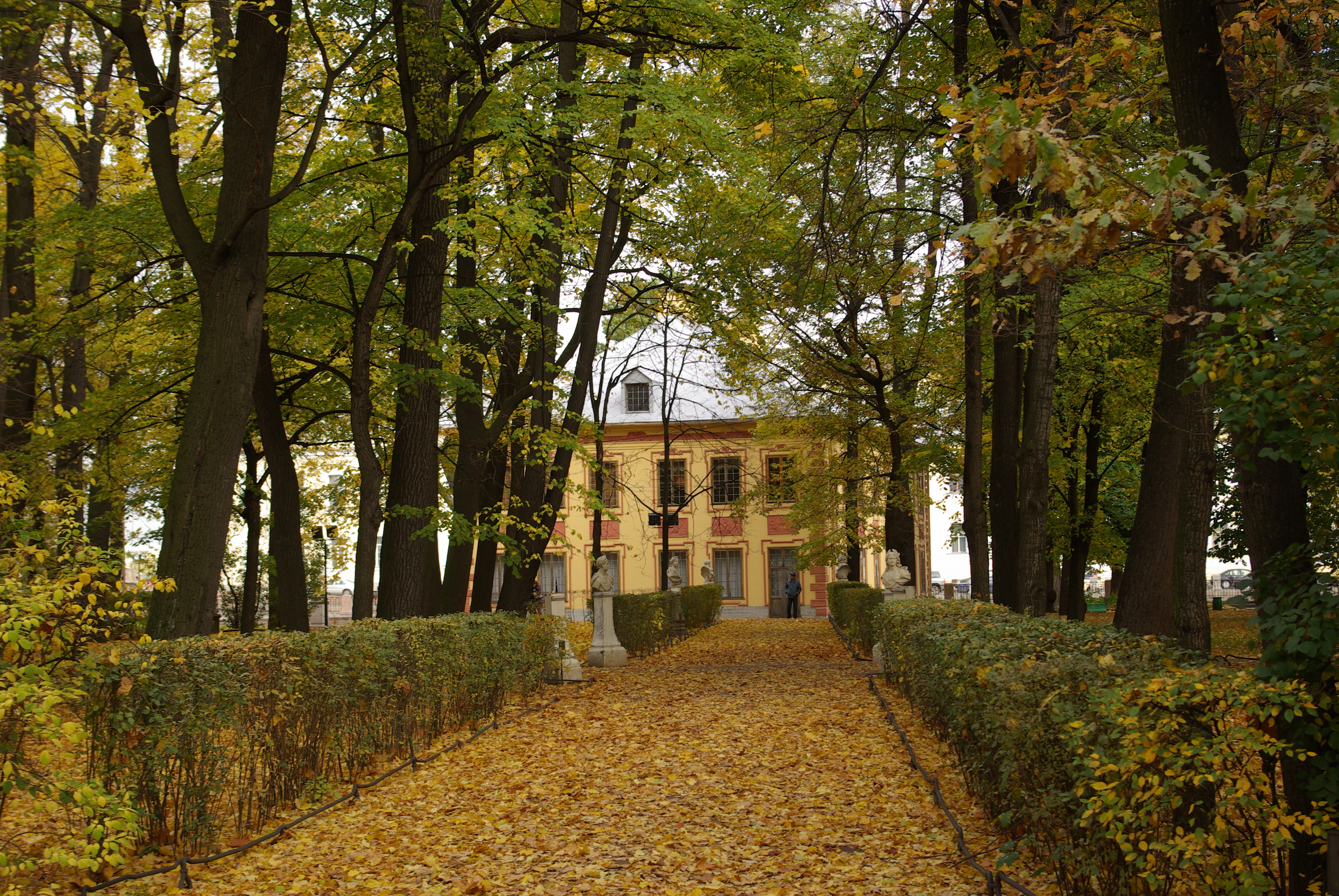
The river frontage	The palace in 1809	Seen from behind the railing of the Summer Garden	Summer Palace in Autumn
