= Christian Wilhelm Ernst Dietrich =

German painter (1712–1774)

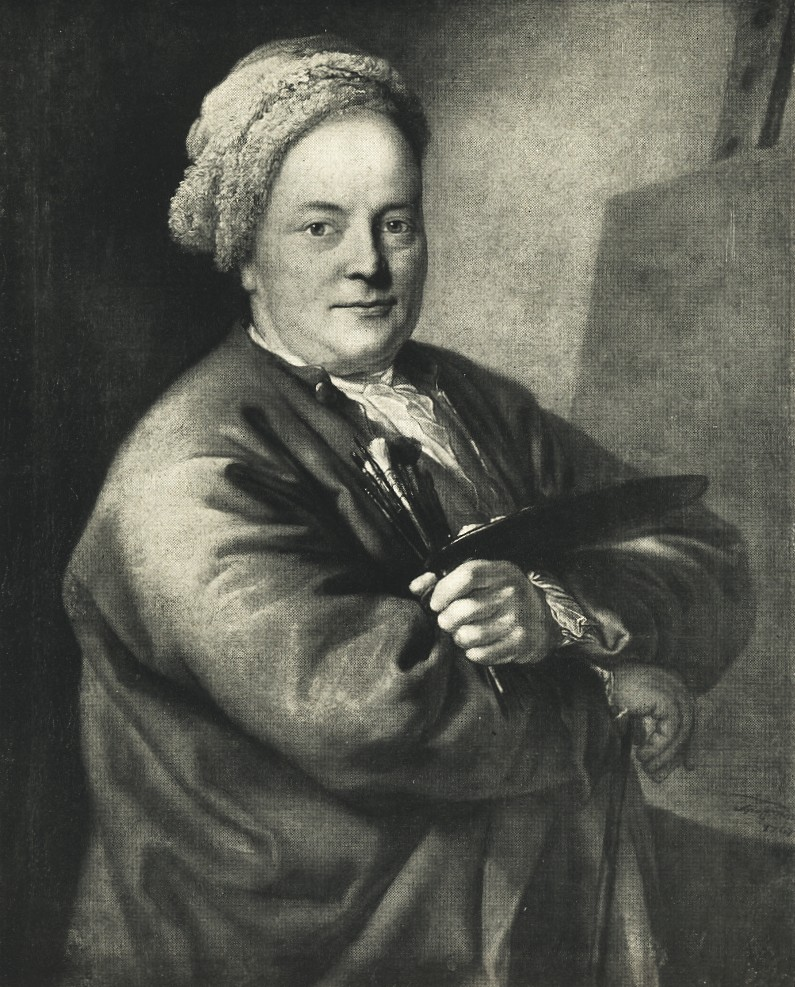
- C. W. E. Dietrich (1767); portrait by Anton Graff
- Born: October 30, 1712; Weimar, Thuringia, Germany
- Died: April 23, 1774 (aged 61); Dresden, Saxony, Germany

Christian Wilhelm Ernst Dietrich (30 October 1712 – 23 April 1774) was a German painter and art administrator. In his own works, he was adept at imitating many earlier artists, but never developed a style of his own.

== Early life ==
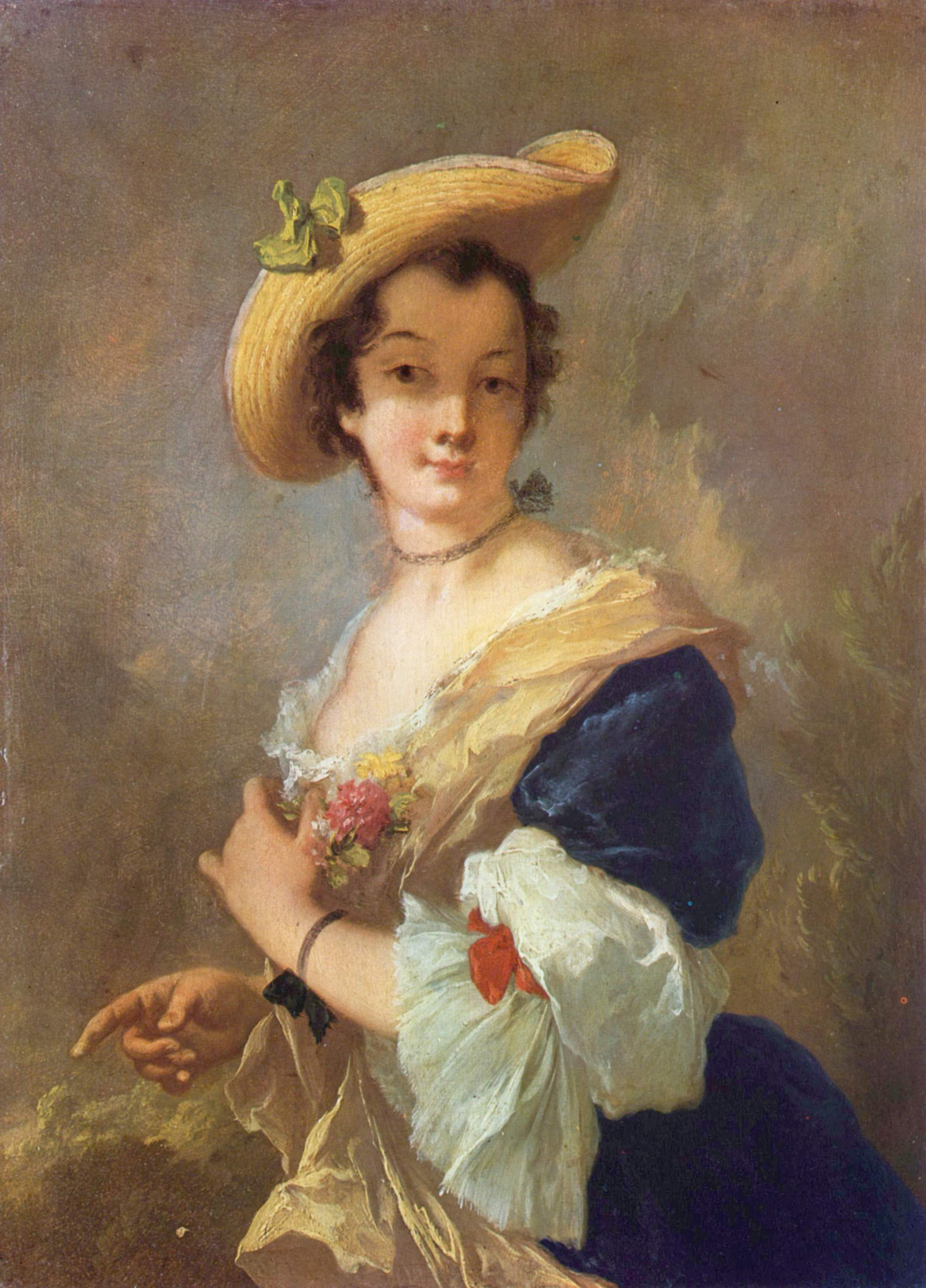
Christian Wilhelm Ernst Dietrich, Portrait of a Woman with a Straw Hat

Dietrich was born at Weimar, where he was brought up early to the profession of art by his father Johann Georg, then painter of miniatures to the court of the duke. Dietrich's sister was painter Maria Dorothea Dietrich.

== Career ==
Dietrich was sent to Dresden to perfect himself under the care of Johann Alexander Thiele. At the age of eighteen he finished a painting in two hours, which attracted the attention of the king of Saxony, Augustus II. He was so pleased with Dietrich's work that he gave him means to study abroad, and visit the chief cities of Italy and the Netherlands. There he learned to copy and to imitate masters of the previous century with a versatility that was truly surprising. Johann Joachim Winckelmann, to whom he had been recommended, called him the Raphael of landscape. His landscapes were frequently based on the works of Salvator Rosa and Allaert van Everdingen.

He was also successful in aping the style of Rembrandt, and numerous examples of this habit may be found in the galleries of St. Petersburg, Vienna and Dresden. At Dresden there are pictures acknowledged to be his, bearing the fictitious dates of 1636 and 1638, and the name of Rembrandt. Among Dietrich's reproductions of Ostade's manner is the Itinerant Singers at the National Gallery. Dietrich tried every branch of art except portraits, painting Italian and Dutch views alternately with scripture scenes and still life. He also created multiple engravings, a collection of which are at the British Museum and are inspired by Ostade and Rembrandt.

In 1741 he was appointed court painter to Augustus III at Dresden, with an annual salary of 400 thalers, conditional on the production of four cabinet pictures a year. This condition likely accounts for the presence of fifty-two of the master's panels and canvases in one of the rooms at the Dresden museum. In 1746, he was appointed inspector of galleries.

Dietrich, though popular and probably the busiest artist of his time, never produced anything of his own.

Dietrich, after his return from the Peninsula, generally signed himself Dieterich, and with this signature most of his extant pictures are inscribed.

== Later years and death ==
He died at Dresden, after he had successively filled the important appointments of director of the school of painting at the Meissen porcelain factory (appointed 1763) and professor of the Dresden Academy of Art (appointed 1765).

== Gallery ==
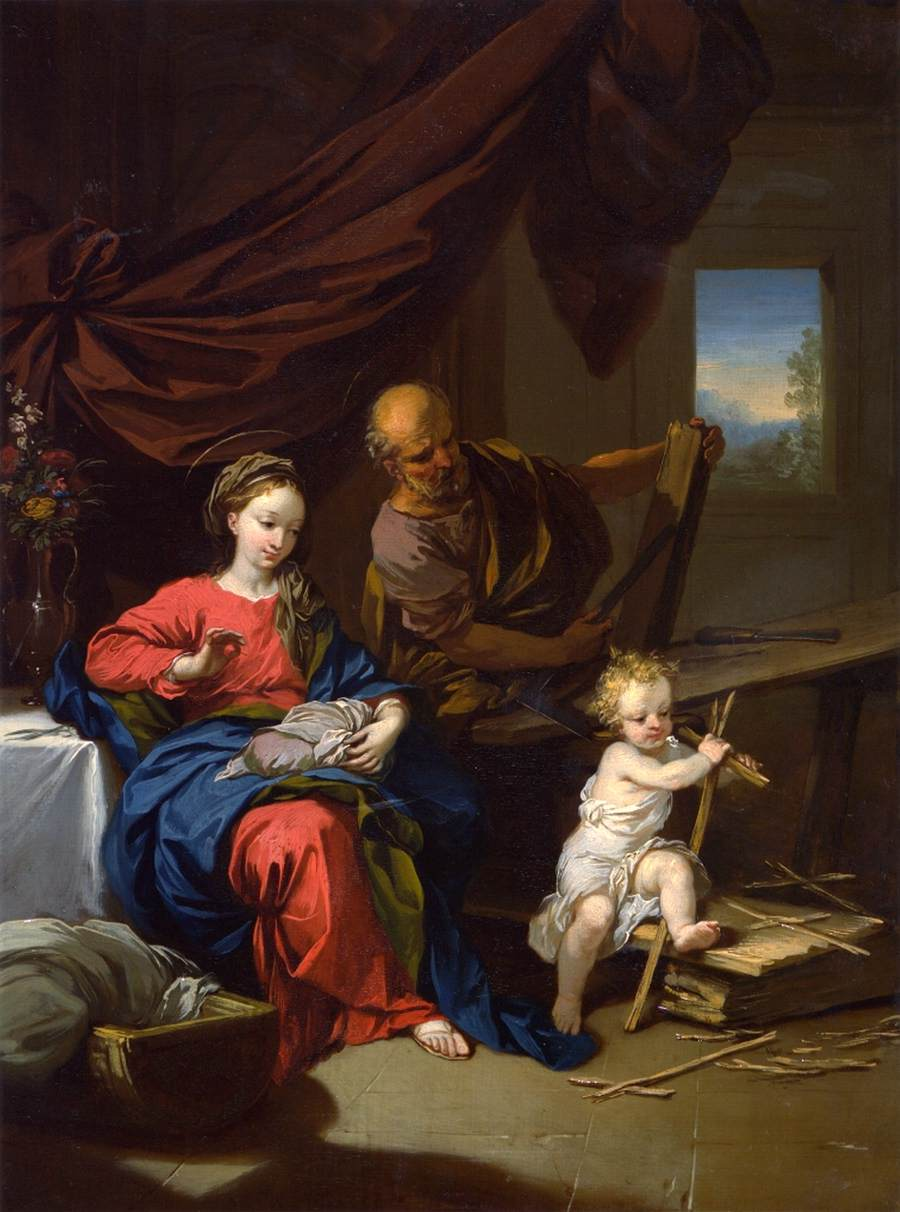
The Holy Family in a Carpenter's Shop

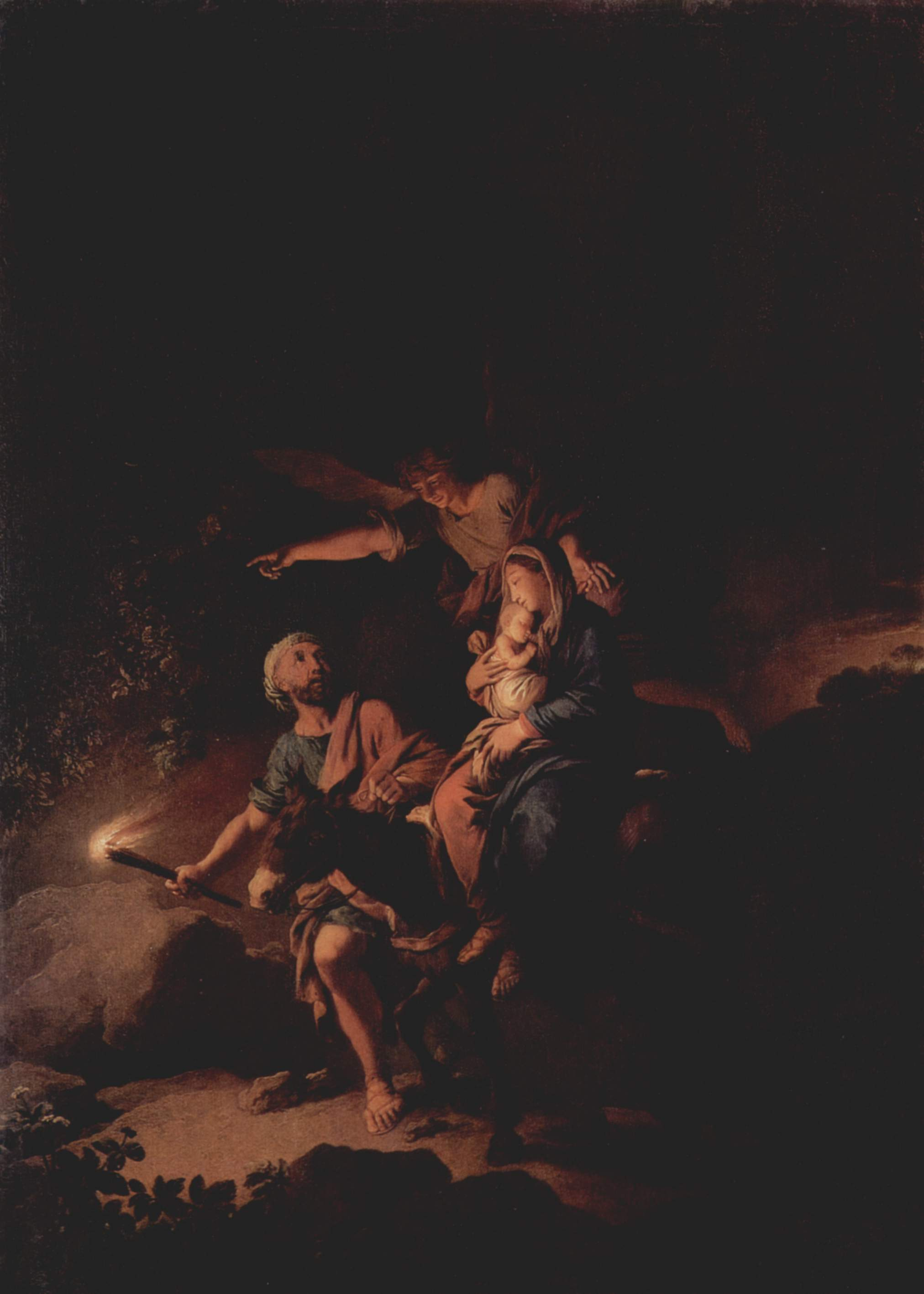
The Flight into Egypt

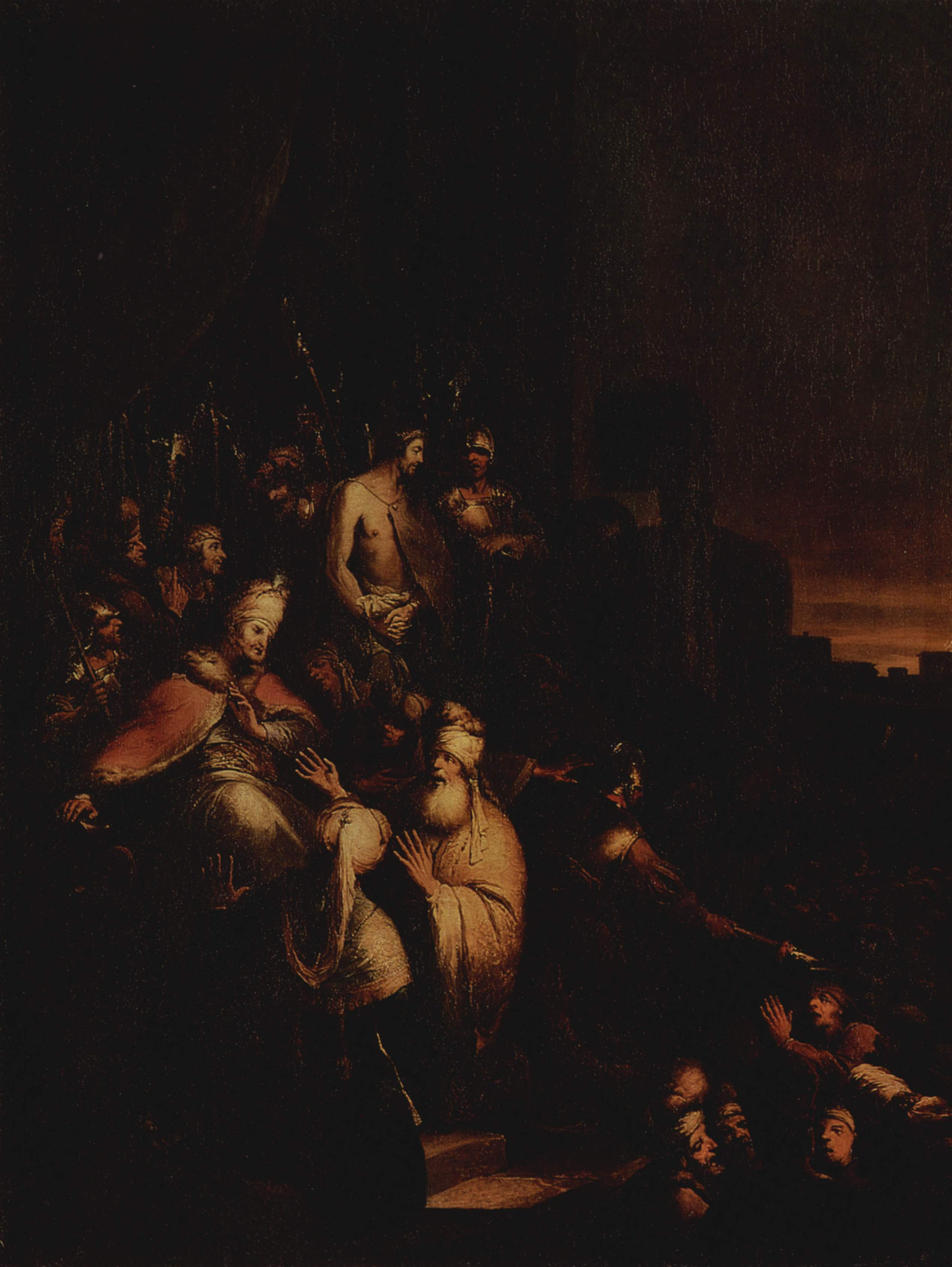
Christ Before the People

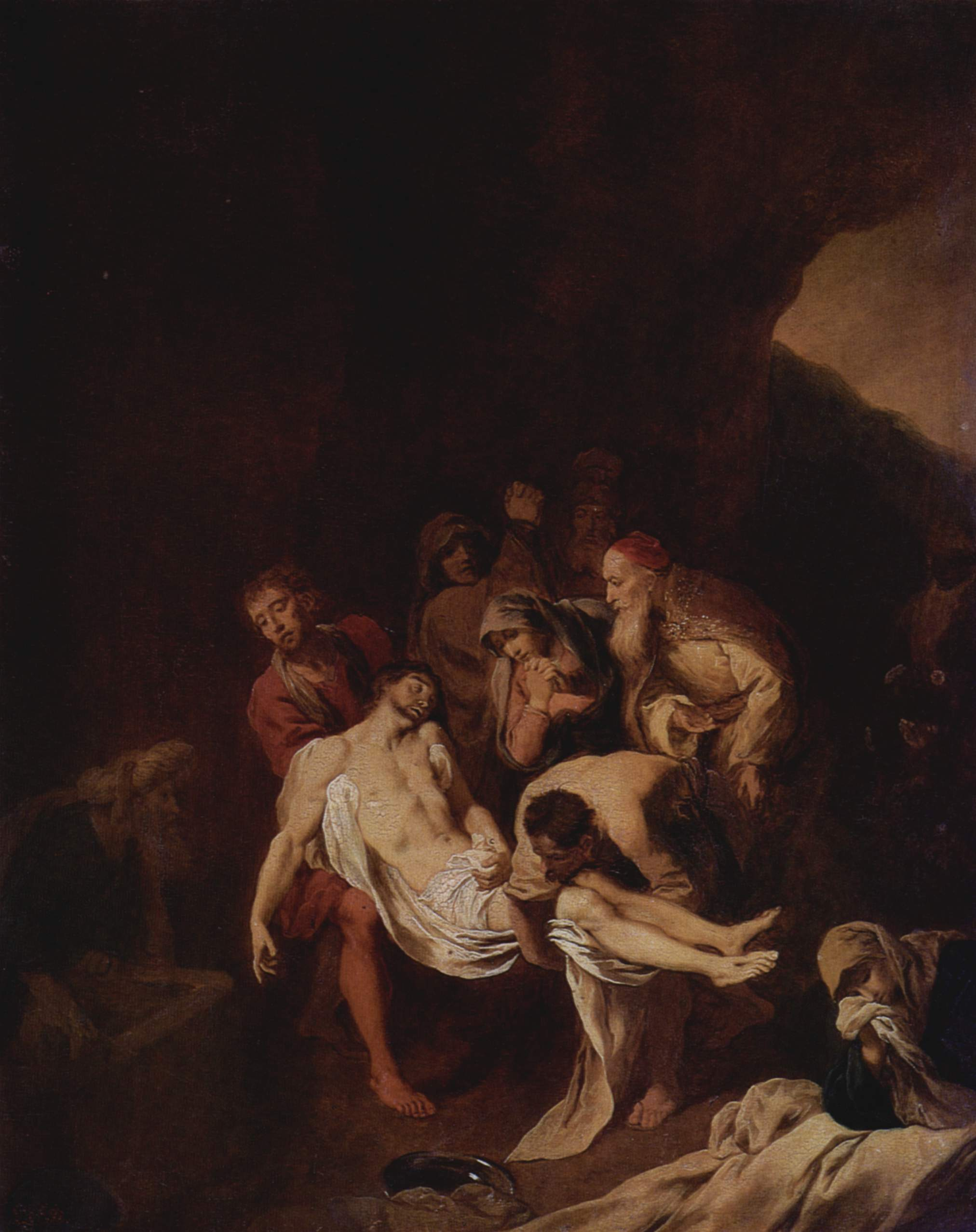
Christ's Entombment

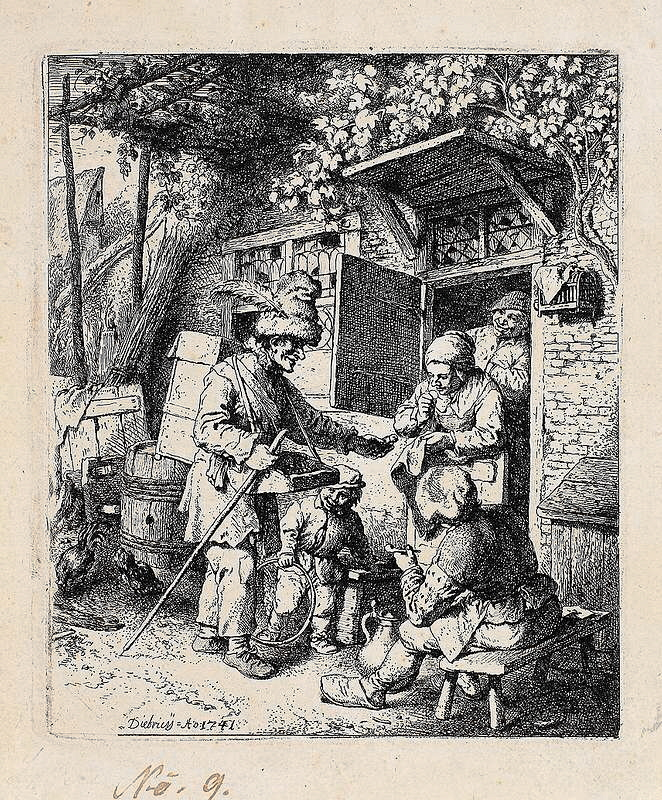
Haberdasher

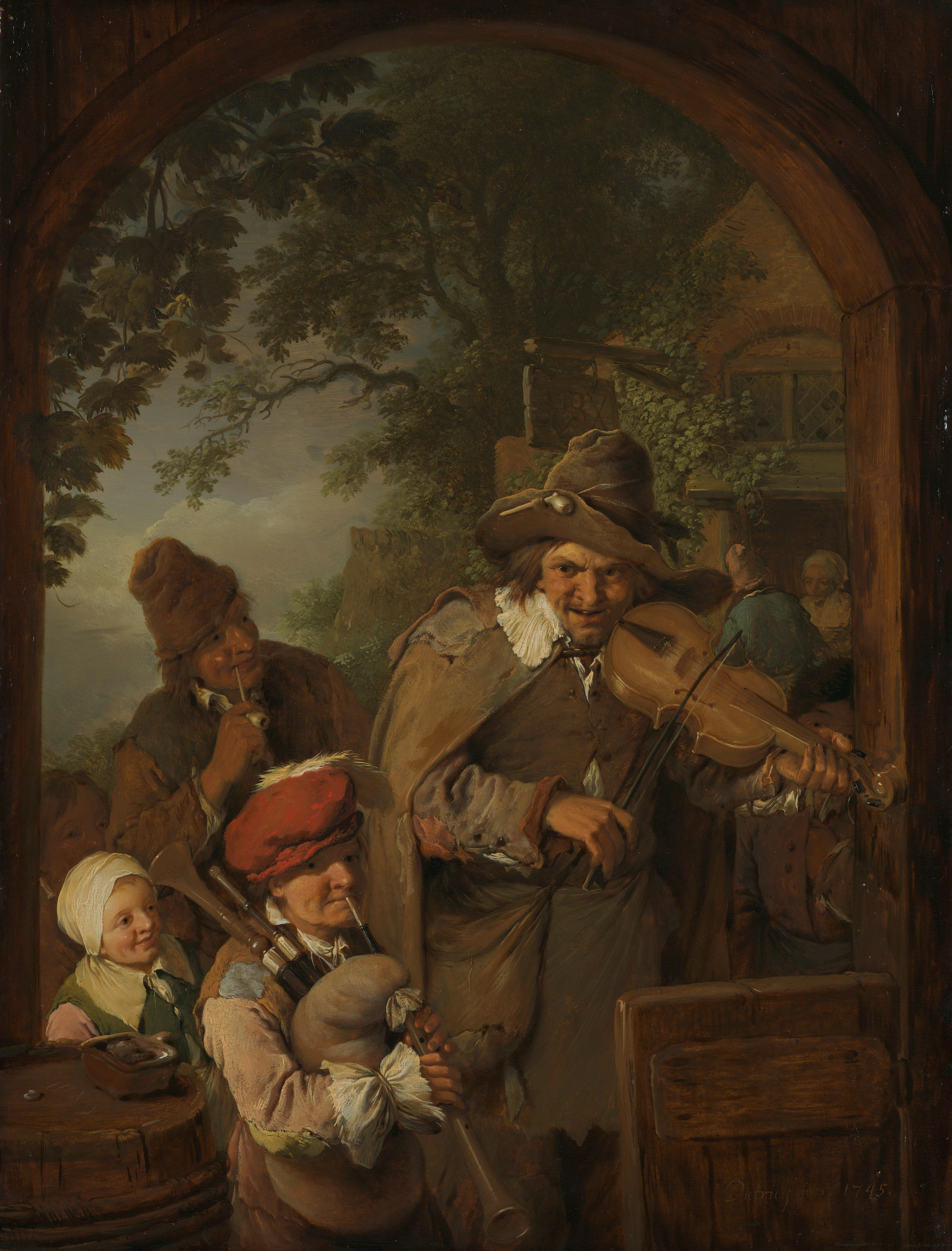
The Wandering Musicians

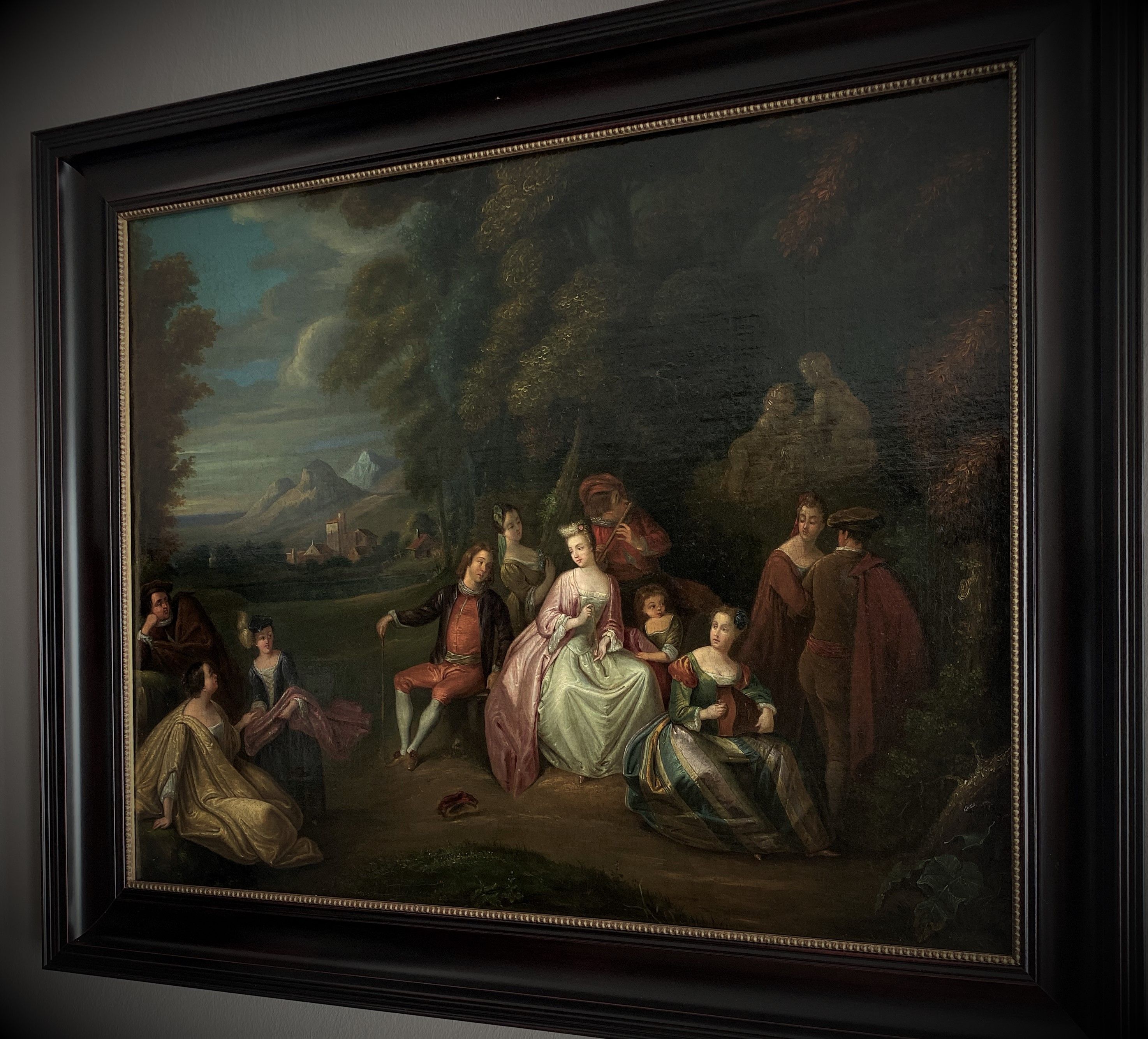
Concert champetre, 1737, oil on canvas
