= Mikhail Zemtsov =

Russian architect (1688–1743)

Mikhail Grigorievich Zemtsov (Russian: Михаи́л Григо́рьевич Земцо́в; 1688–1743) was a Russian architect who practiced a sober, restrained Petrine Baroque style, which he learned from his peer Domenico Trezzini. He has been described as "the first professionally trained Russian architect in history".

== Career ==
Peter the Great put Zemtsov in charge of implementing designs by foreign architects such as Trezzini (in whose house Zemtsov took up residence) and Niccolo Michetti (also serving as interpreter for him). In 1723, he travelled to Stockholm in order to hire the most highly skilled masons for the tsar.

During the early part of his career, Zemtsov participated in designing the Summer Garden in St Petersburg and the park in Peterhof Palace. The other project in which he was involved was the design of Catherinethal palace and park in Reval (1718–25). His Italian Palace on the Fontanka Embankment (1726–28) was demolished, and his Anichkov Palace (1741–50) was later rebuilt.

Zemtsov was appointed one of the principal architects of the Russian capital in 1737, working on the Transfiguration Cathedral in St. Petersburg along with Pietro Antonio Trezzini. He completed his work on the Russian Building Code two years before his death.

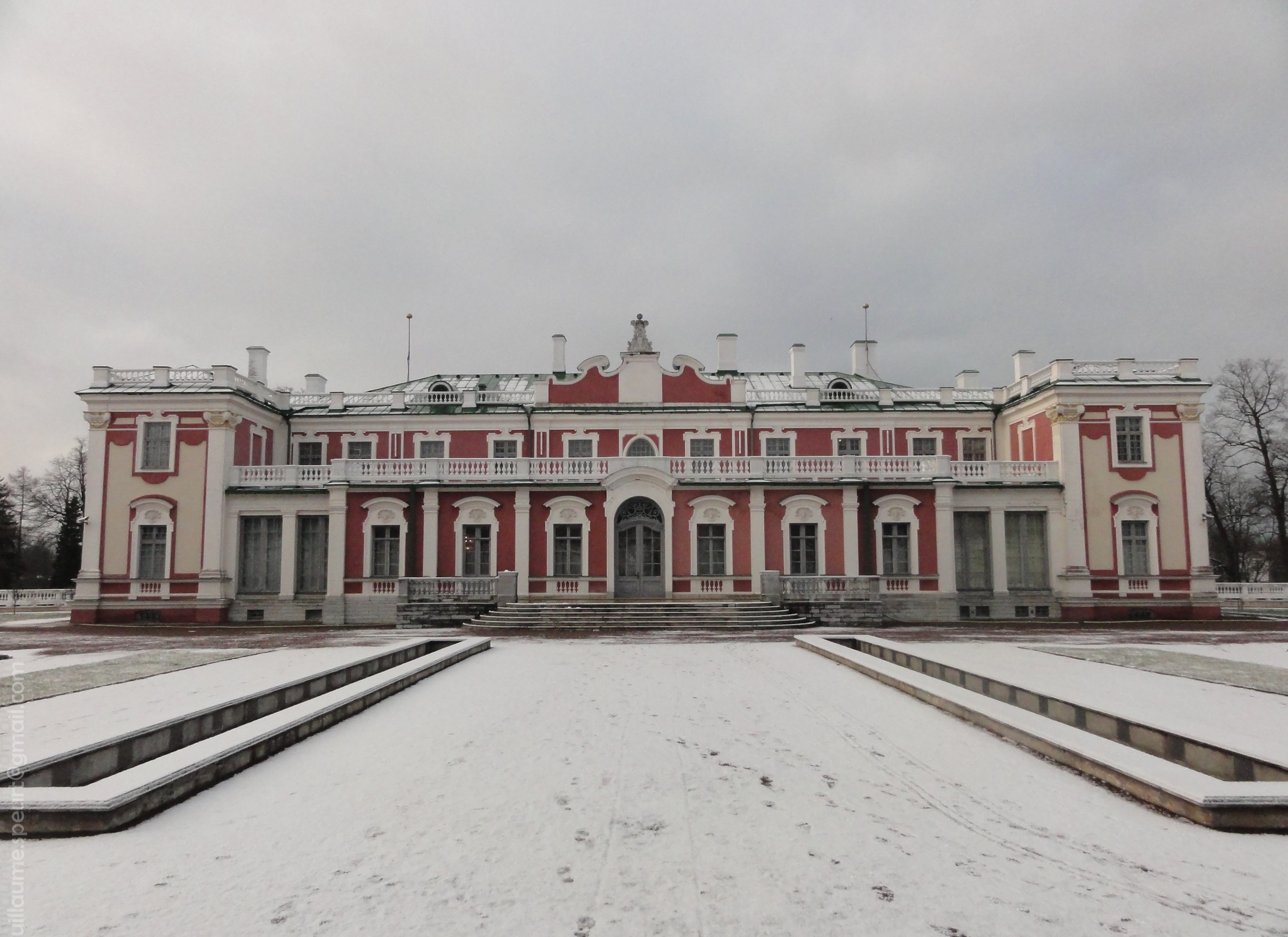
Zemtsov was in charge of the construction works at Catherinethal, Reval

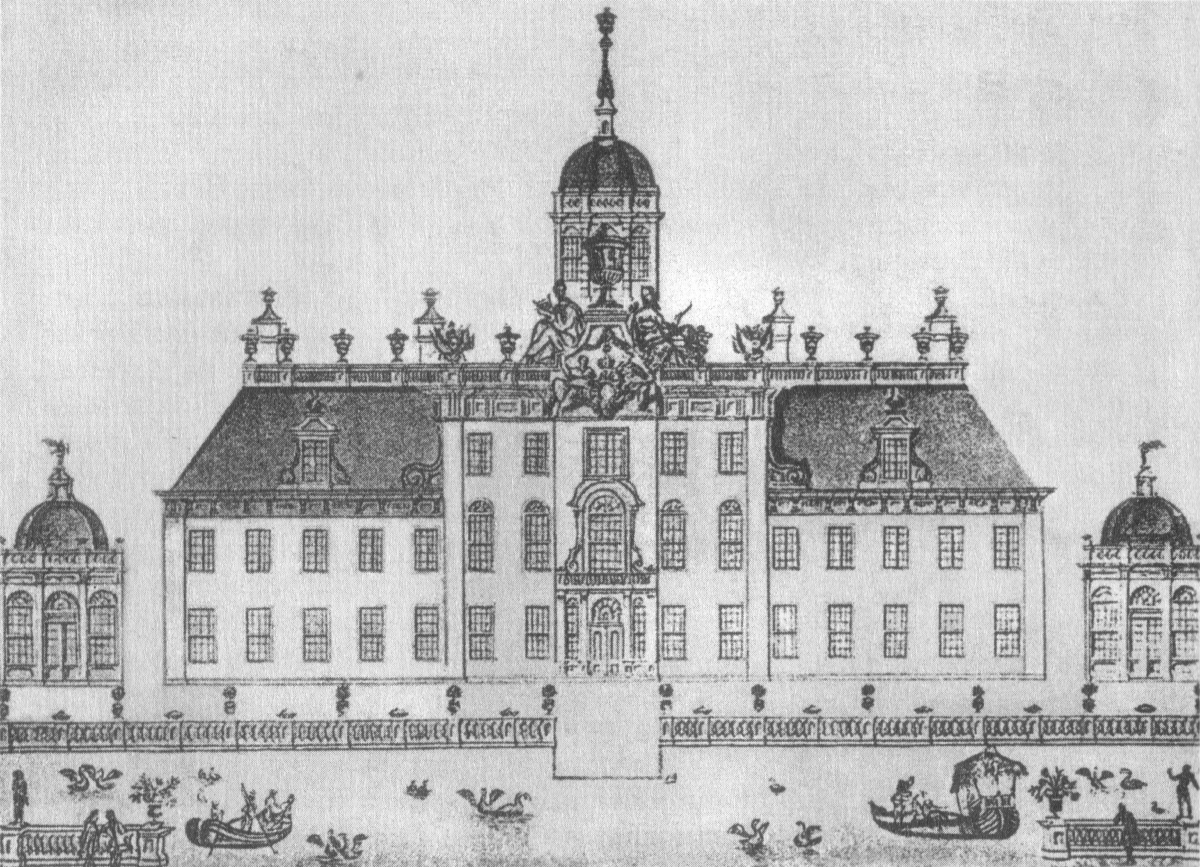
Zemtsov oversaw the construction of Podzorny Palace (as designed by Steven van Zwieten)

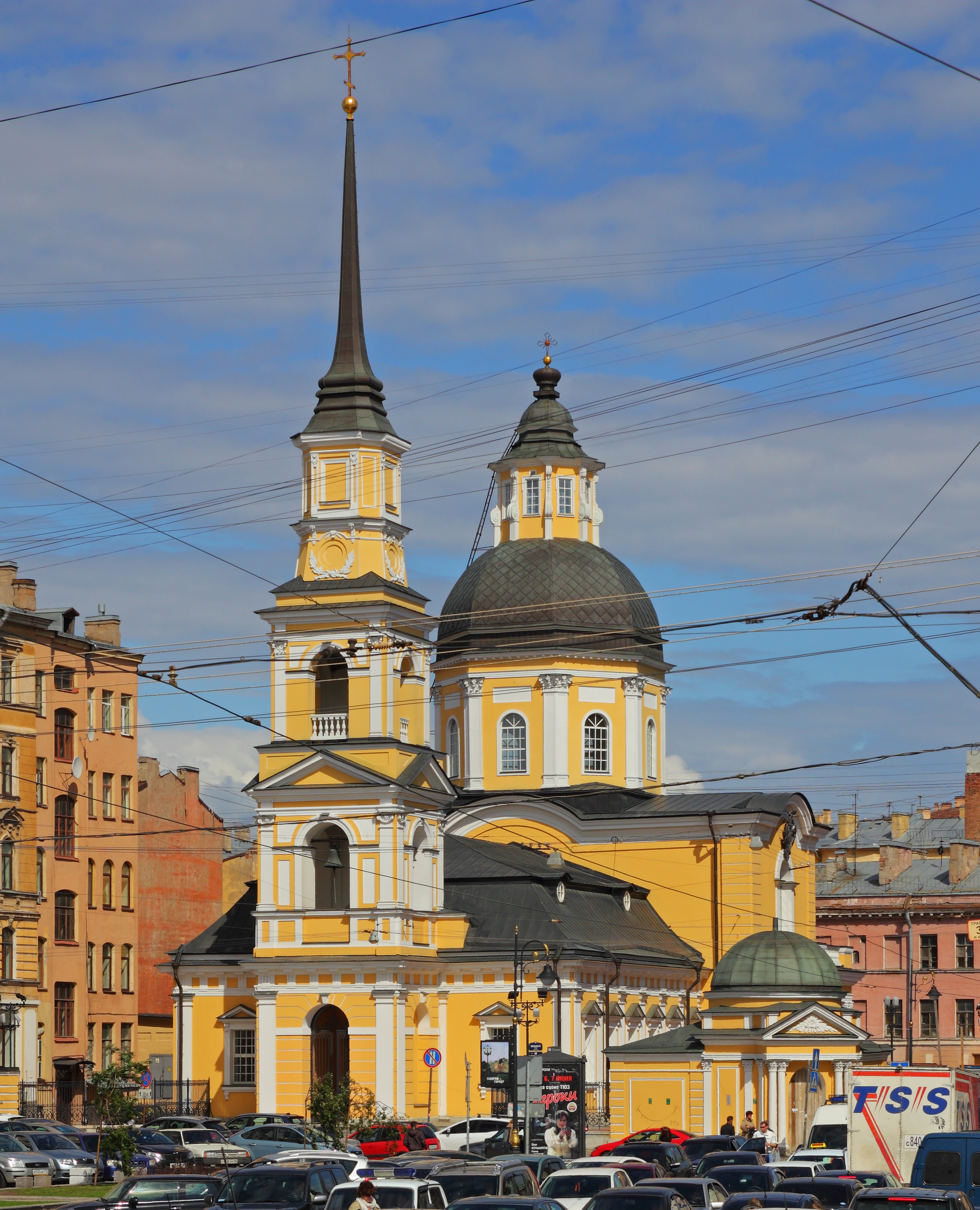
The small church of Saints Simon and Anne (1734) is one of a few extant buildings by Zemtsov
