= Francesco Fontebasso =

Italian painter (1707–1769)

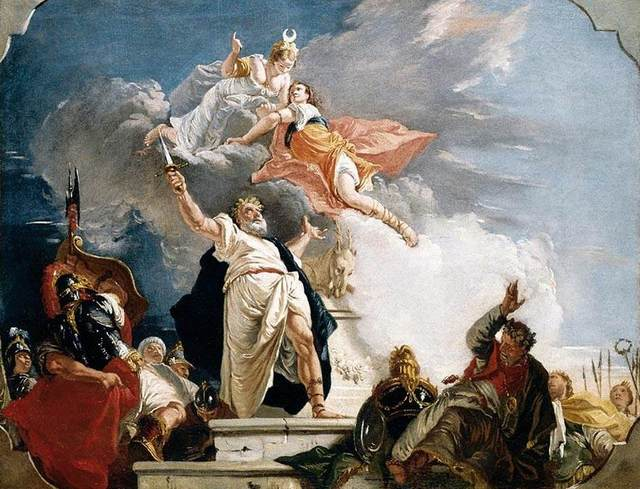
The Sacrifice of Iphigenia (1749).

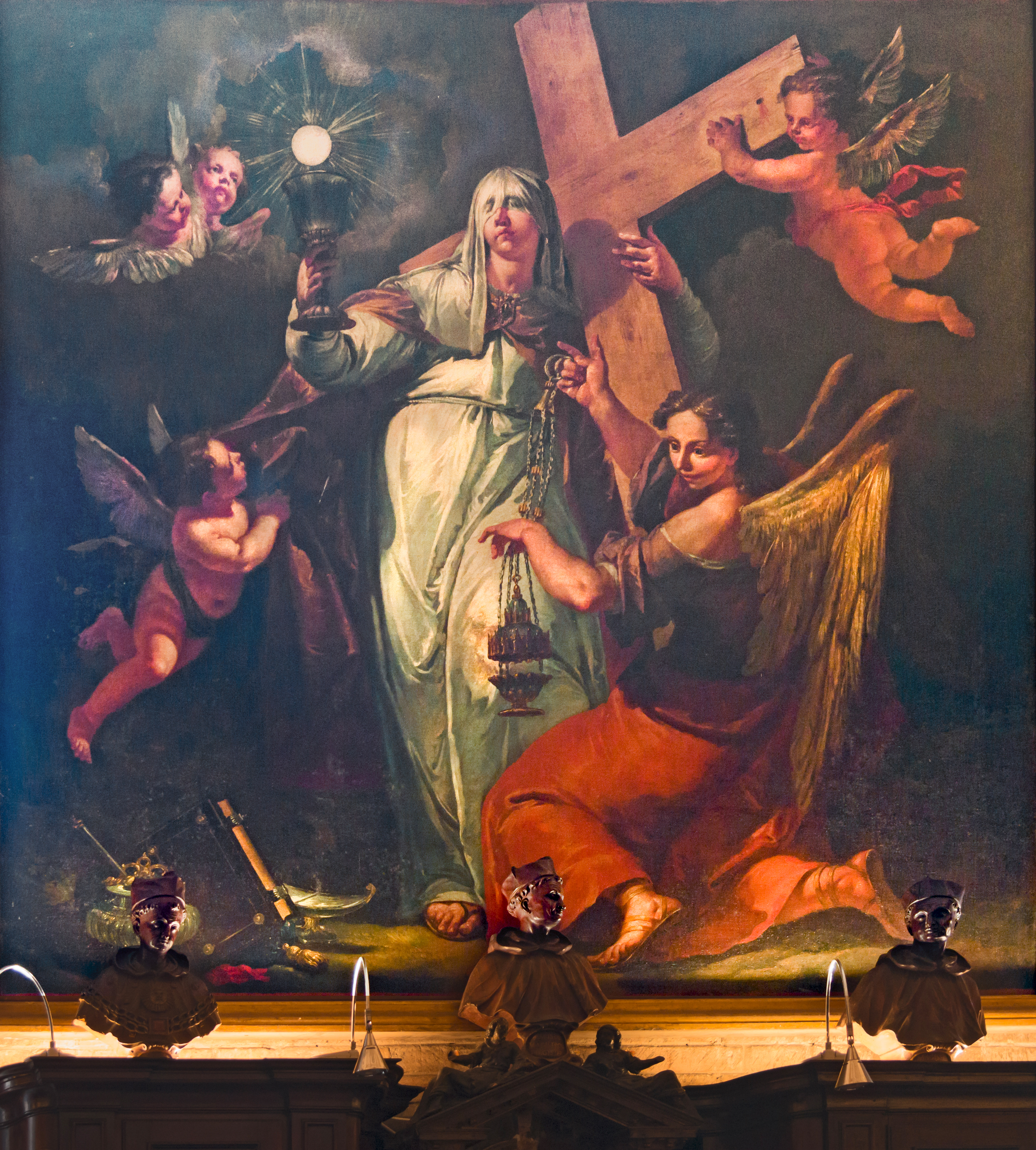
Allegory of Faith (v.1750) San Zanipolo Venice

Francesco Fontebasso (4 October 1707 – 31 May 1769) was an Italian painter of the late-Baroque or Rococo period of Venice. He first apprenticed with Sebastiano Ricci, but was strongly influenced by his contemporary, Giovanni Battista Tiepolo. In 1761, Fontebasso visited Saint Petersburg and produced ceiling paintings and decorations for the Winter Palace. Fontebasso returned to Venice in 1768. He helped decorate a chapel in San Francesco della Vigna.

He died in Venice in 1769. He is represented in collections in e.g. Kadriorg Palace (part of the Art Museum of Estonia) in Tallinn, Estonia.

The Prado Museum in Spain owns a painting The Bridegroom and the foolish Virgins along with 9 drawings.

== Sources ==
- Getty biography (archived 20 September 2006)
