= Maria Dorothea Wagner =

German painter

- Born: Maria Dorothea Dietrich; 1719; Weimar, Saxe-Weimar, Holy Roman Empire
- Died: 1792 (aged 72–73); Meissen, Electorate of Saxony, Holy Roman Empire
- Known for: Landscape painting
- Style: Baroque

Maria Dorothea Wagner (1719 - 1792) was a German painter and draughtswoman. She was primarily a landscape artist, focusing on the landscape of Saxony.

== Life and work ==
Maria Dorothea Wagner was born in 1719 in Weimar. Her father was a court painter for the duchess Sophie Charlotte of Brandenburg-Bayreuth. Her brother was Christian Wilhelm Ernst Dietrich.

She died in 1792 in Meissen.

== Notable collections ==
- Landscape with a waterfall over which a footbridge leads, on the left a farmer drives two cows down to the valley, in the background a ruin, 18th century, Städel Museum
- Rising sunken path on a river, 18th century, Städel Museum

== Gallery ==
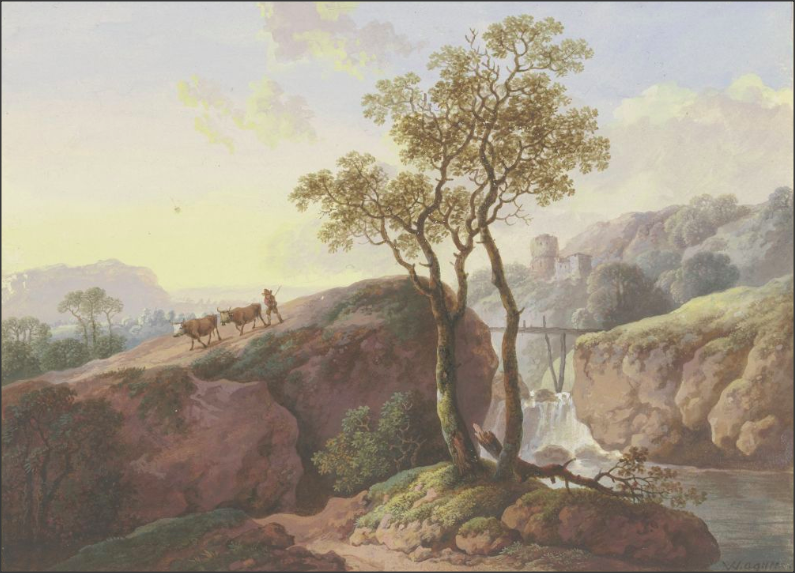
Landscape with Waterfall
