= Nicola Michetti =

Italian architect (1675–1758)

Nicola Michetti, also known as Niccolo or Niccolò (c. 7 December 1675 in Venice – 12 November 1758 in Rome) was an Italian architect, active in a late-Baroque style in mostly Rome, Italy and St Petersburg, Russia.

== Career ==
While born in Venice, Nicola worked for years in Rome under Carlo Fontana, including as a foreman (Capomaestro) in the reconstruction of the Basilica of Santi Apostoli. Nicola independently submitted a proposal for the Trevi Fountain (1704), however, the winning commission went to Salvi. Nicola performed smaller architectural projects in Rome, including the altar and the architecture of the Sacripante chapel (1712) in Sant'Ignazio. In 1715, he submitted a losing design against competitors like Juvarra, Canevari and others to be able to design a new sacristy of St. Peter's Basilica. That same year, he designed and help build a chapel of the church of Santa Maria in Transpontina and for the Rospigliosi chapel in the church of San Francesco a Ripa (which hosts an altarpiece by Chiari).

Between 1718 and 1723, Michetti moved to Russia, and became employed by Tsar Peter the Great as court architect. His main work of these years is the garden and the cascading fountain of the Peterhof Palace near St Petersburg. He made designs for Kadriorg Palace in Tallinn and the Constantine Palace in Strelna. His plan for a monumental lighthouse on the Black Sea was never executed. Many of his designs from the Russian era are now in the Hermitage Museum .

Returning to Rome, Michetti was inducted into the Accademia di San Luca in 1725 and appointed architect of the Apostolic Chamber and of the Theatine Order. During these few years in Rome, he completed other important commissions including the renovation of Palazzo Colonna (1731–1735), as well as much work in ephemeral scenography in the theater.

== Gallery ==
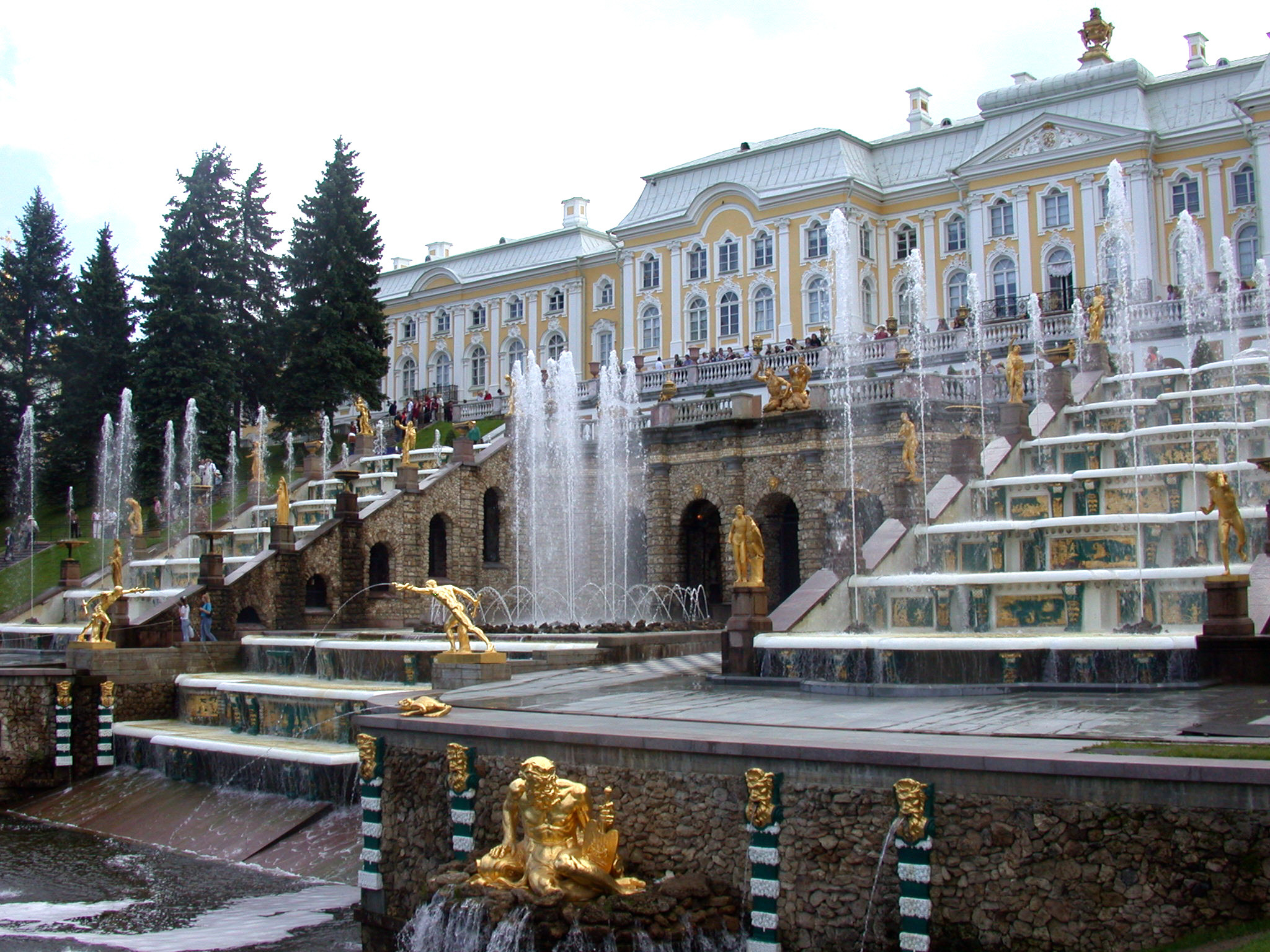
Cascade at Peterhof

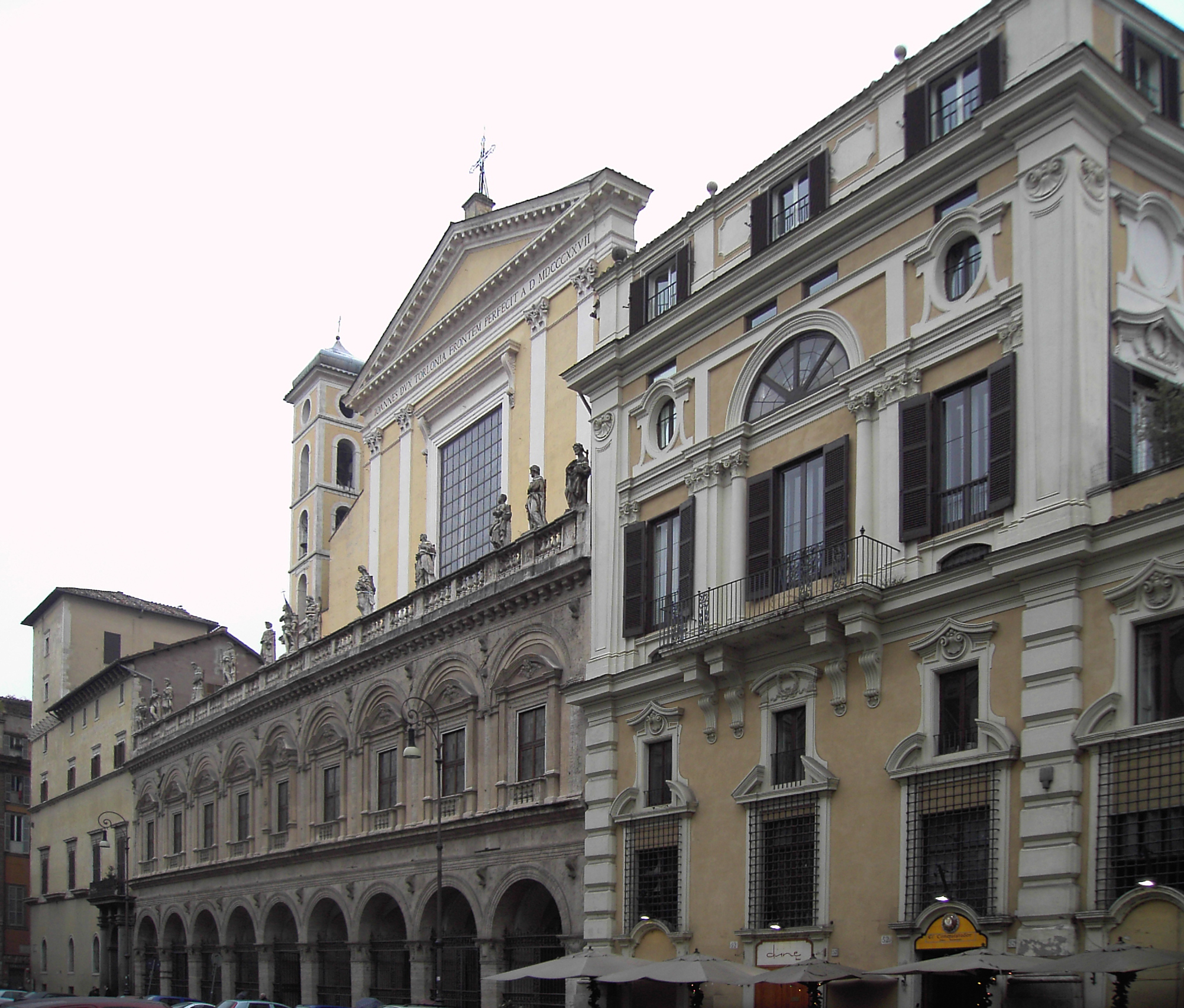
Corner tower of Palazzo Colonna

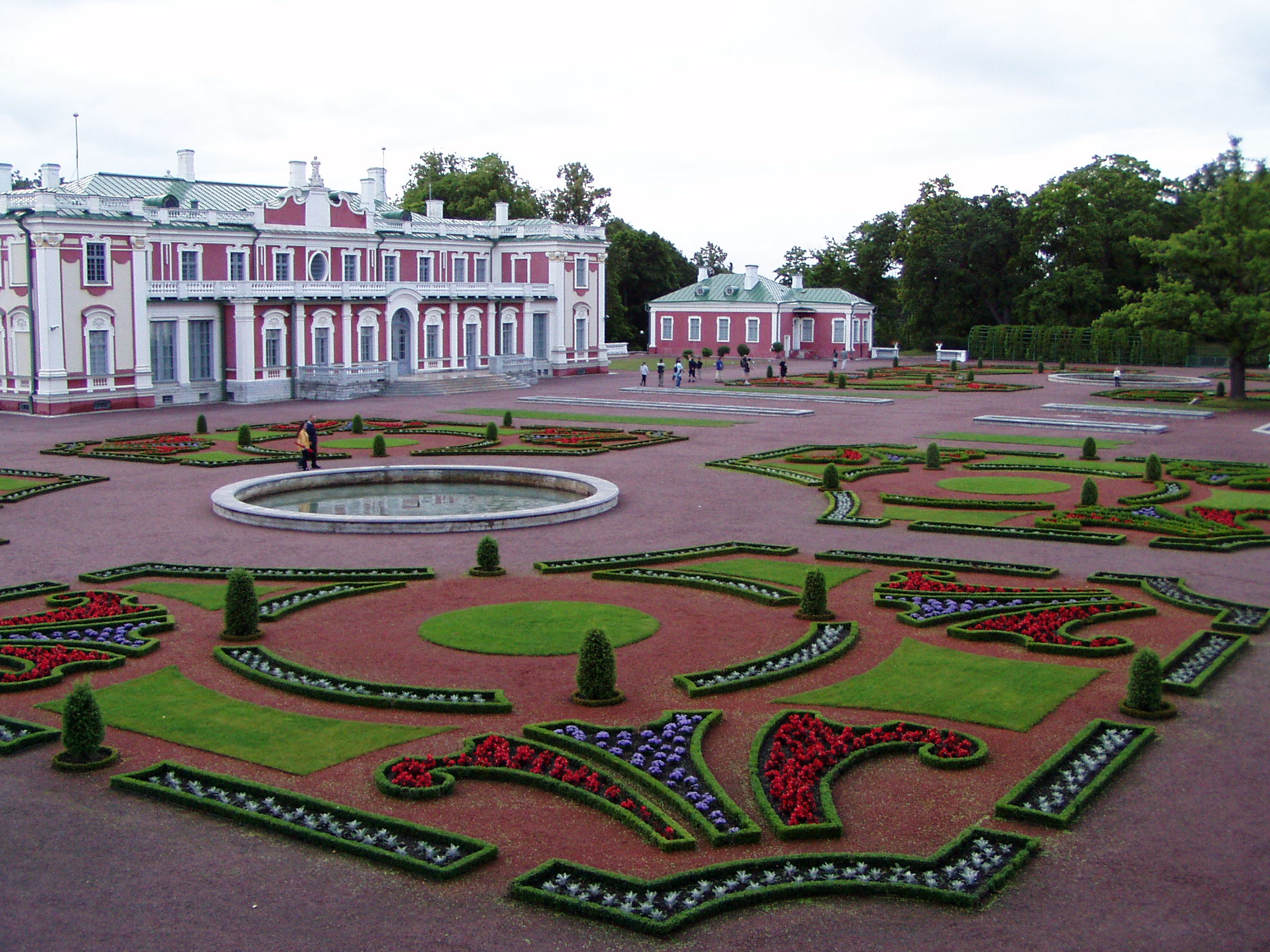
Kadriorg Palace, Tallinn
