= Mattarnovy =

Surname

Mattarnovy may refer to:

- Georg Johann Mattarnovi, architect (d. 1719), father of Philipp Georg Mattarnovi
- Philipp Georg Mattarnovi, engraver (1716–1742)
