= Saint Pantaleon's Church (Saint Petersburg) =

St. Pantaleon's Church
- Church of the Holy Great Martyr and Healer Panteleimon
- Пантелеи́моновская це́рковь
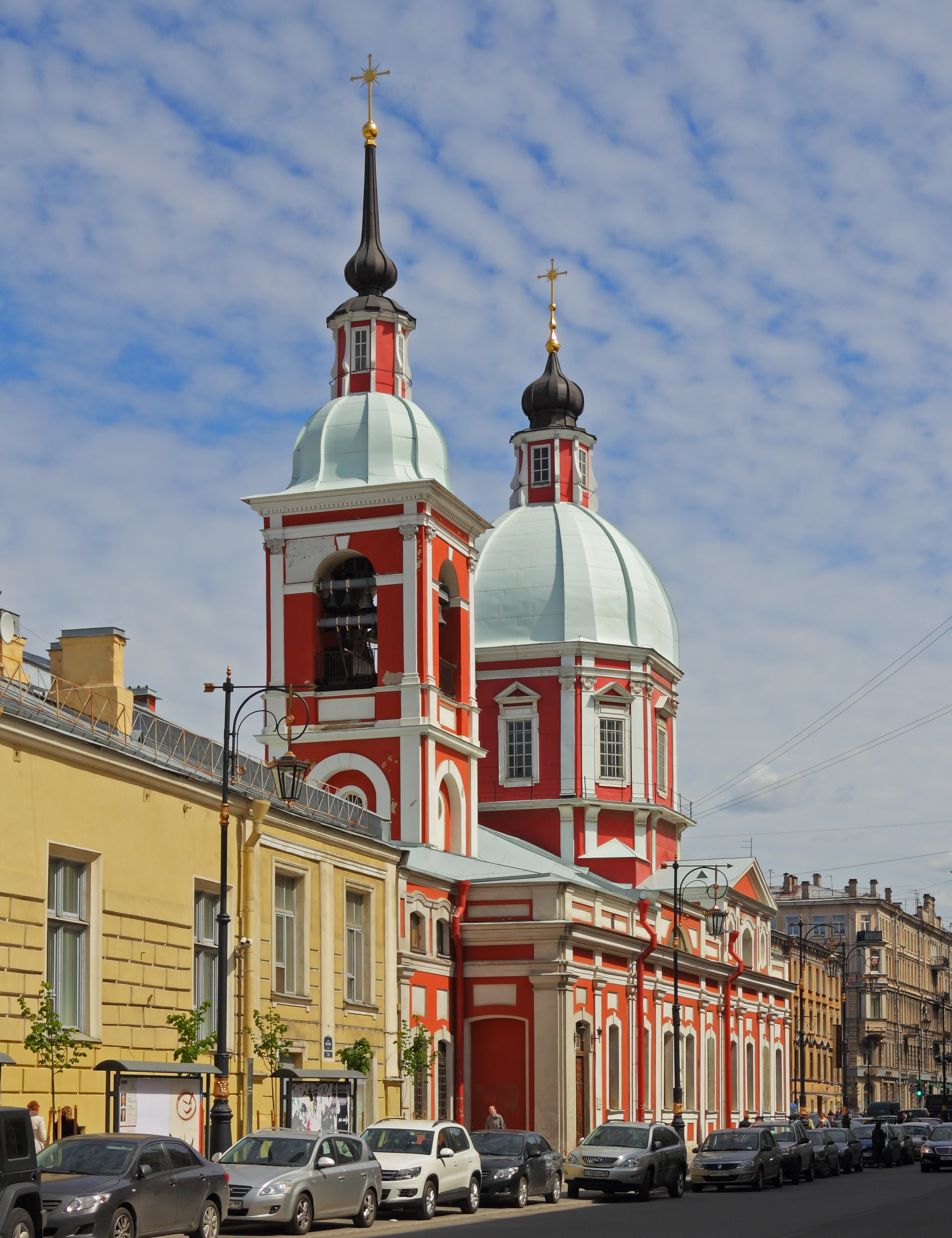
- St. Pantaleon's Church
- 59.942397°N 30.341033°E
- Location: Pestelya Street, Saint Petersburg
- Country: Russia
- Denomination: Russian Orthodox

History
- Status: Parish church
- Dedication: Saint Panteleimon

Architecture
- Functional status: active
- Style: Petrine Baroque
- Years built: 1735-1739

Administration
- Diocese: Diocese of Saint Petersburg

St. Pantaleon's Church (Russian: Пантелеи́моновская це́рковь) is a parish Eastern Orthodox church in Saint Petersburg, at the intersection of Pestelya Street and Solyanoy Lane. It is an 18th-century architectural monument in the petrine baroque style.

== History ==
From 1833-1834, Alexander Pushkin lived near the church and often attended services there.

== Clergy ==
- Parson of the church: Archpriest Alexander Rumyantsev
- Archpriest Ilian Lavrentiev
- Archpriest Alexander Nikanorov
