= Saints Peter and Paul Cathedral, Saint Petersburg =

Russian Orthodox cathedral

Coordinates: 59.9502°N 30.3164°E

Peter and Paul Cathedral
- Петропавловский собор (Russian)
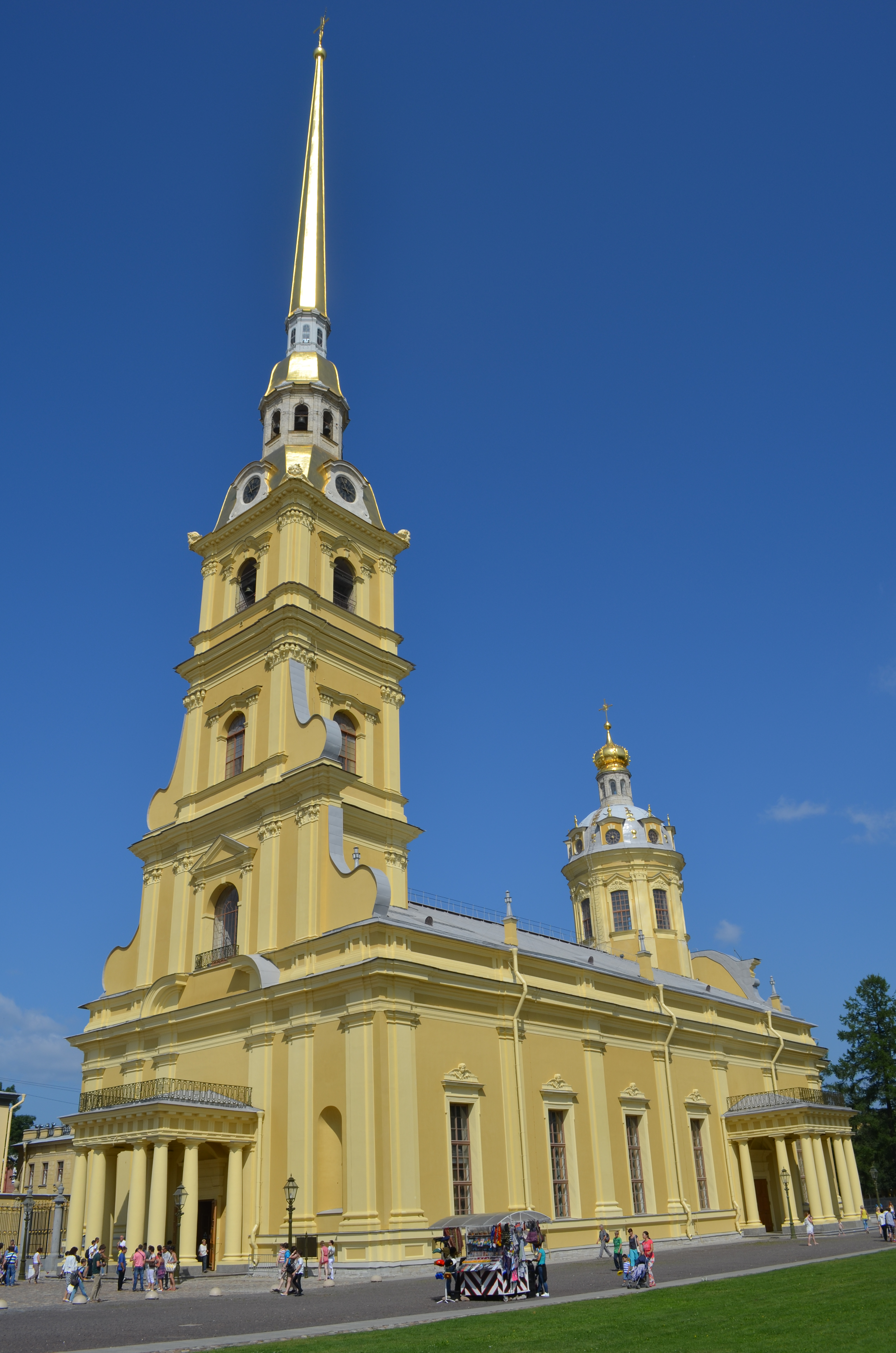

Religion
- Affiliation: Russian Orthodox
- Patron: Peter and Paul

Location
- Country: Russia
- Interactive map of Peter and Paul Cathedral

Architecture
- Architect: Domenico Trezzini
- Style: Petrine Baroque
- Groundbreaking: 1712
- Completed: 1733; 293 years ago

The Peter and Paul Cathedral (Russian: Петропавловский собор, romanized: Petropavlovskiy sobor) is a Russian Orthodox cathedral located inside the Peter and Paul Fortress in St. Petersburg, Russia. It is the first and oldest landmark in St. Petersburg, built between 1712 and 1733 on Hare Island along the Neva River. Both the cathedral and the fortress were originally built under Peter the Great and designed by Domenico Trezzini. The cathedral's bell tower is the world's tallest Orthodox bell tower. Since the belfry is not standalone, but an integral part of the main building, the cathedral is sometimes considered the second tallest Orthodox Church in the world. There is another Cathedral of Saints Peter and Paul Church in St. Petersburg, located in Petergof.

== Architecture ==
The current building, the first stone church in St. Petersburg, was designed by Trezzini and built between 1712 and 1733. Its gold-painted spire reaches a height of 123 meters (404 ft) and features at its top an angel holding a cross. This angel is one of the most important symbols of St. Petersburg.

The cathedral's architecture also features a unique iconostasis (the screen which separates the nave of the church from the sanctuary). In the Eastern Orthodox Church the iconostasis is normally a flat wall or screen with three doors through it, the central Holy Doors used only for very solemn entrances, and the two side doors, by which the clergy and others enter and leave the sanctuary. However, at St. Peter and Paul, the iconostasis rises to form a sort of tower over the sanctuary.

The cathedral has a typical Flemish carillon, a gift of the Flemish city of Mechelen, Flanders.

== Church functions ==
The cathedral is dedicated to Saints Peter and Paul, the patron saints of the fortress (Saint Peter being the patron saint of the city). The current cathedral is the second one on the site. The first, built soon after Peter's founding of the city, was consecrated by Archbishop Iov of Novgorod the Great in April 1704.

The cathedral was the cathedral church (i.e., the seat of the bishop; the term cathedral—sobor (собор) in Russian—can mean the seat of a bishop, but it can also mean simply a large or important church) of the city until 1859 (when St Isaacs became the city's cathedral.) The current cathedral church of St. Petersburg is the Kazan Cathedral on Nevsky Prospect.

The cathedral was closed in 1919 and turned into a museum in 1925. It is still officially a museum; religious services, however, resumed in 2000.

== Imperial tombs ==
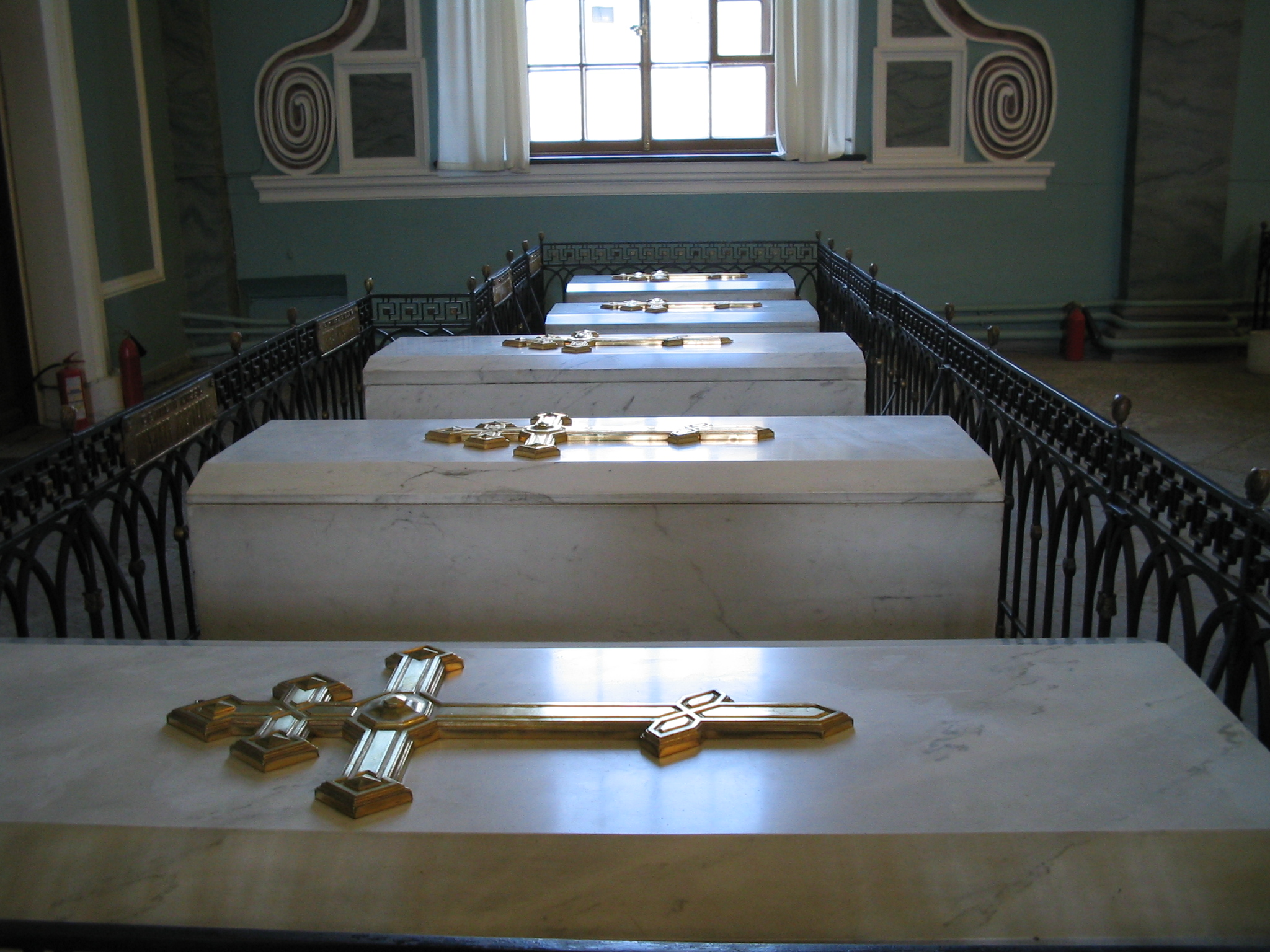
Tombs inside the cathedral

Tombstones marking the burial of Tsar Nicholas II and his family in St. Catherine's Chapel

The cathedral houses the remains of almost all the Russian emperors and empresses from Peter the Great to Nicholas II and his family, who were finally laid to rest in July 1998.

Of the post-Petrine rulers, only Peter II and Ivan VI are not buried here. Peter II is buried in the Cathedral of Michael the Archangel in the Moscow Kremlin; Ivan VI was executed and buried in the fortress of Shlisselburg or Kholmogory (alleged discovery at Kholmogory in 2010 currently under forensic investigation).

On September 28, 2006, 78 years after her death, Maria Feodorovna, Empress of Russia, was reinterred in the Cathedral of St Peter and Paul. Wife of Tsar Alexander III, and mother of Nicholas II (the last Russian tsar), Maria Feodorovna died on 13 October 1928 in exile in her native Denmark and was buried in Roskilde Cathedral in Denmark. In 2005, the governments of Denmark and Russia agreed that the empress's remains should be returned to Saint Petersburg in accordance with her wish to be interred next to her husband.

== Bell tower ==
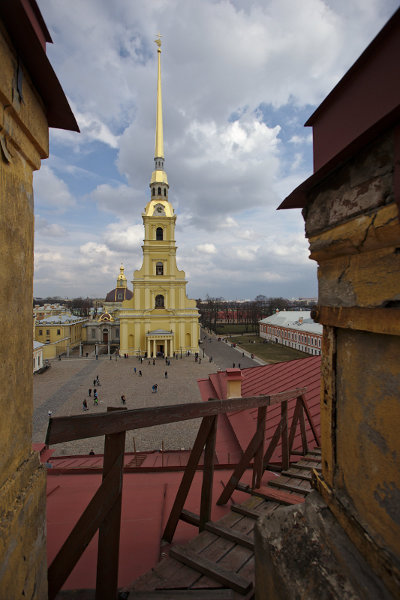
Peter and Paul Cathedral.

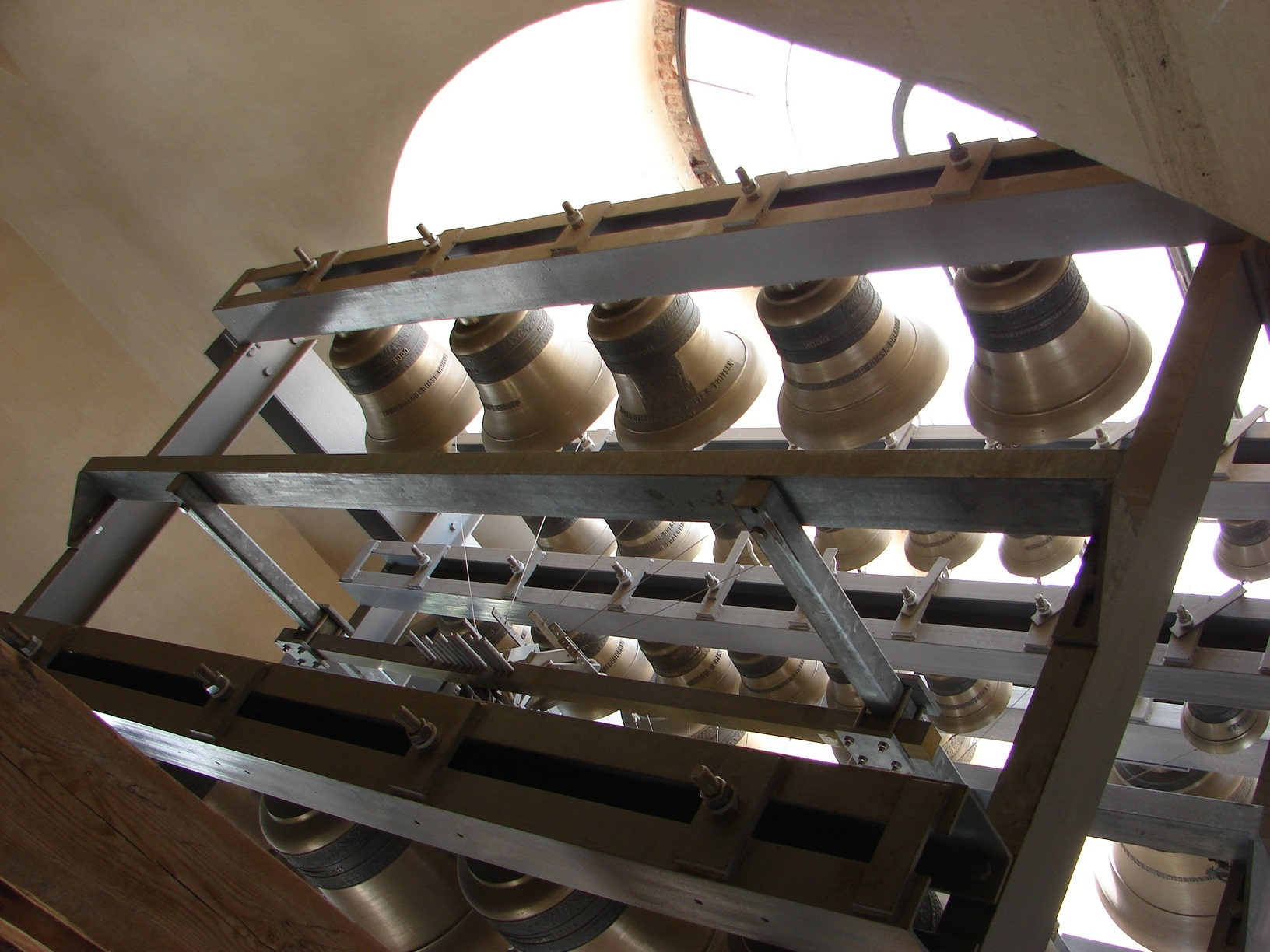
Carillon

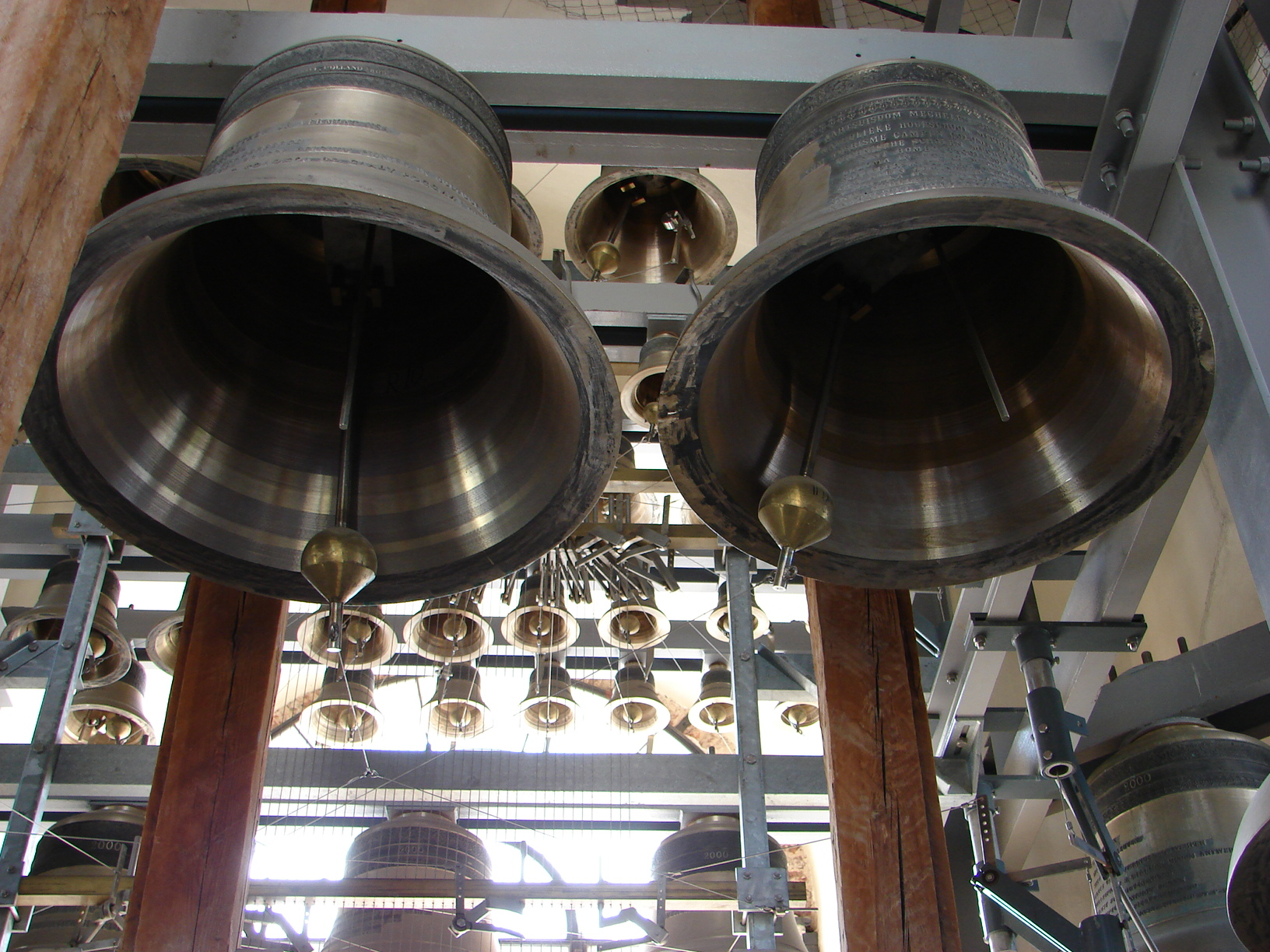
Biggest bells of carillon

The bell tower (with spire) is the dominant feature of this cathedral and the fortress. It serves several functions as part of the structure:

- It is an architectural symbol, an important part of its shape and of the Peter and Paul Fortress.
- It is a part of the imperial tomb - the tombs are on the ground floor.
- It is a lightning rod protecting the cathedral.
- It is a viewing platform upon which excursions meet each hour from 12:00 till 18:00.
- It houses a carillon upon which concerts are periodically performed.

When renovators were cleaning the angel on the spire in 1997, they found a note in a bottle left in one of the folds of the angel's gown. In the note, renovators from 1953 apologized for what they felt was rushed and shoddy work (Soviet premier Nikita Khrushchev wanted the angel refurbished for the 250th anniversary of the city that year). It is said that the renovators in 1997 left another message for future generations, but the contents of that message have not been revealed.

=== History of the carillon ===
When Tsar Peter I of Russia visited the Netherlands in 1698 he heard the perfectly tuned Hemony carillons in Amsterdam and Leiden pealing all 24 hours of the day, every quarter of an hour automatically. Later in 1717 he visited Flanders incognito and climbed the tower of the Cathedral of Our Lady in Antwerp, where he must have heard one of the two Hemony carillons in one of the towers of this cathedral. He was impressed by the sound of a carillon and wanted one like these for his new cathedral in St. Petersburg. So he ordered it in 1720 from the Netherlands. In Amsterdam the only bellfounder at that time, Jan Albert de Grave, was married to the widow of Claude Fremy. This Claude Fremy had been a pupil of Hemony. So Jan Albert de Grave was presumably the bellfounder who made these bells. (Some years later he also made a carillon for Potsdam.) The people in St. Petersburg could only listen to this well-tuned instrument for a short time. In 1756 the tower burned down after a thunderstorm. All its bells were lost.

In 1757, only one year after this disaster, a new carillon was ordered from Holland - this time by a bell-founder in Hoorn named Johan Nicolaas Derck. He cast the bells, and clockmaker Barend Oortkras from the Hague brought them to St. Petersburg to install them. When he arrived, the tower was not rebuilt yet so he could not reinstall the bells. Oortkras stayed in St. Petersburg, but in 1764 he died in poverty before the tower was finished. This new carillon was installed in 1776 by the German clockmaker Johann Erdmann Rudiger. Rudiger also was hired to play the bells. Bell founder Derck could not tune his bells well, so Russian bell founders recast some of the bells in the 19th century. Audibly, this was not a success either. Thus in 2001 a new set of 51 bells were made in the south of the Netherlands. The bells were cast and the carillon installed by the Royal foundry workshop Petit & Fritsen from Aarle-Rixtel in North Brabant. The carillon comprises 51 bells with a gross weight of 15,160 kg (33,420 lb); the biggest bell weighs about 3 tonnes (3.0 long tons; 3.3 short tons), the smallest only 10 kg (22 lb). The carillon has a range of four octaves, so most classical and modern music can be performed on this instrument.

The Peter and Paul carillon is a gift to Saint Petersburg from the Government of Flanders and from more than 350 sponsors from different countries. The contribution was presented in the name of Her Majesty Queen Fabiola of Belgium, the Belgian King Boudewijn Fund, the Government of Flanders, the authorities of various Flemish cities and communities, including businesses, and financial institutions, cultural communities, schools and universities, and also ordinary citizens of Belgium, Russia, England, Germany, Lithuania, the Netherlands, New Zealand, Portugal, the US and Japan.

== Gallery ==
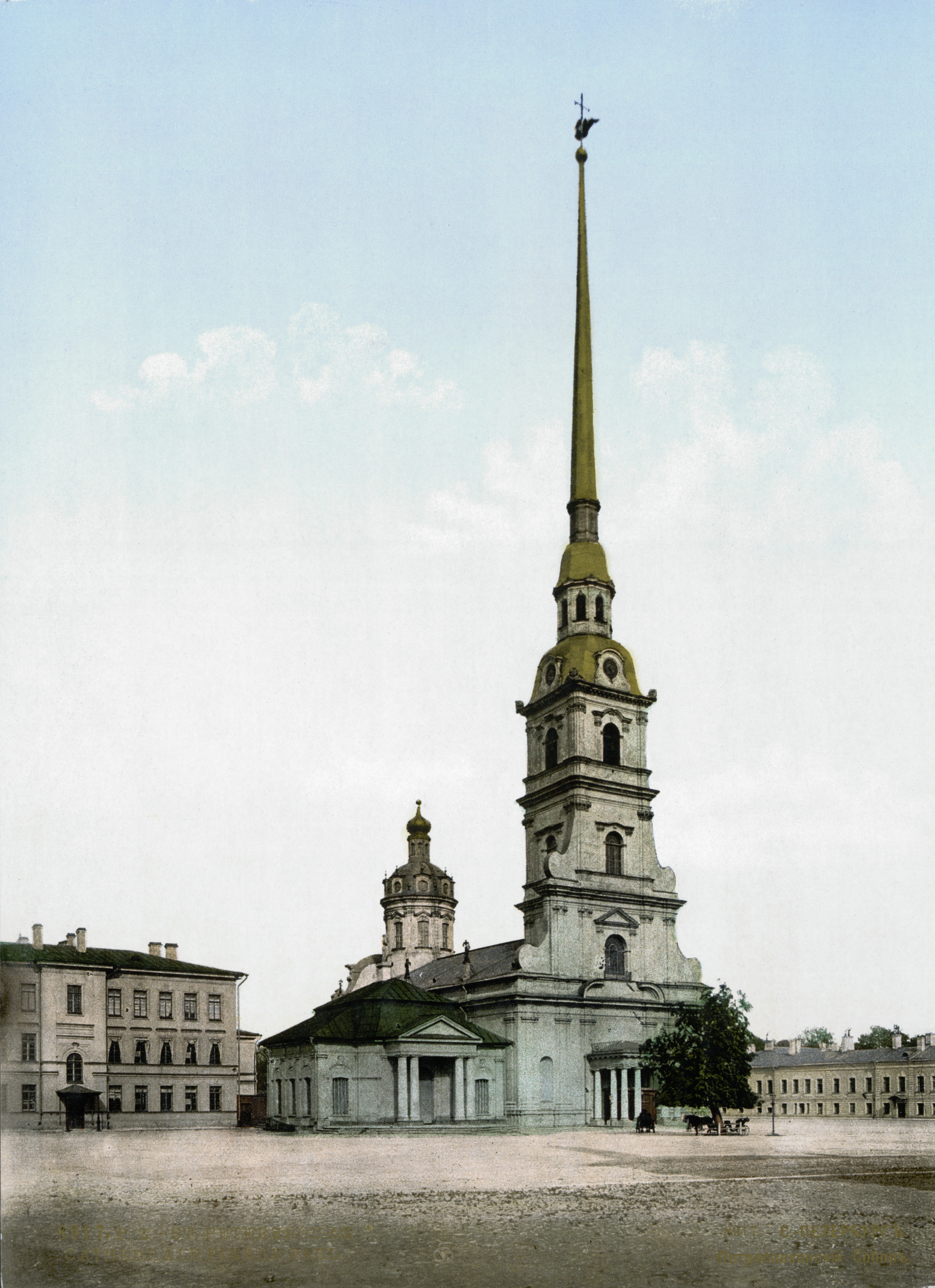
Old postcard

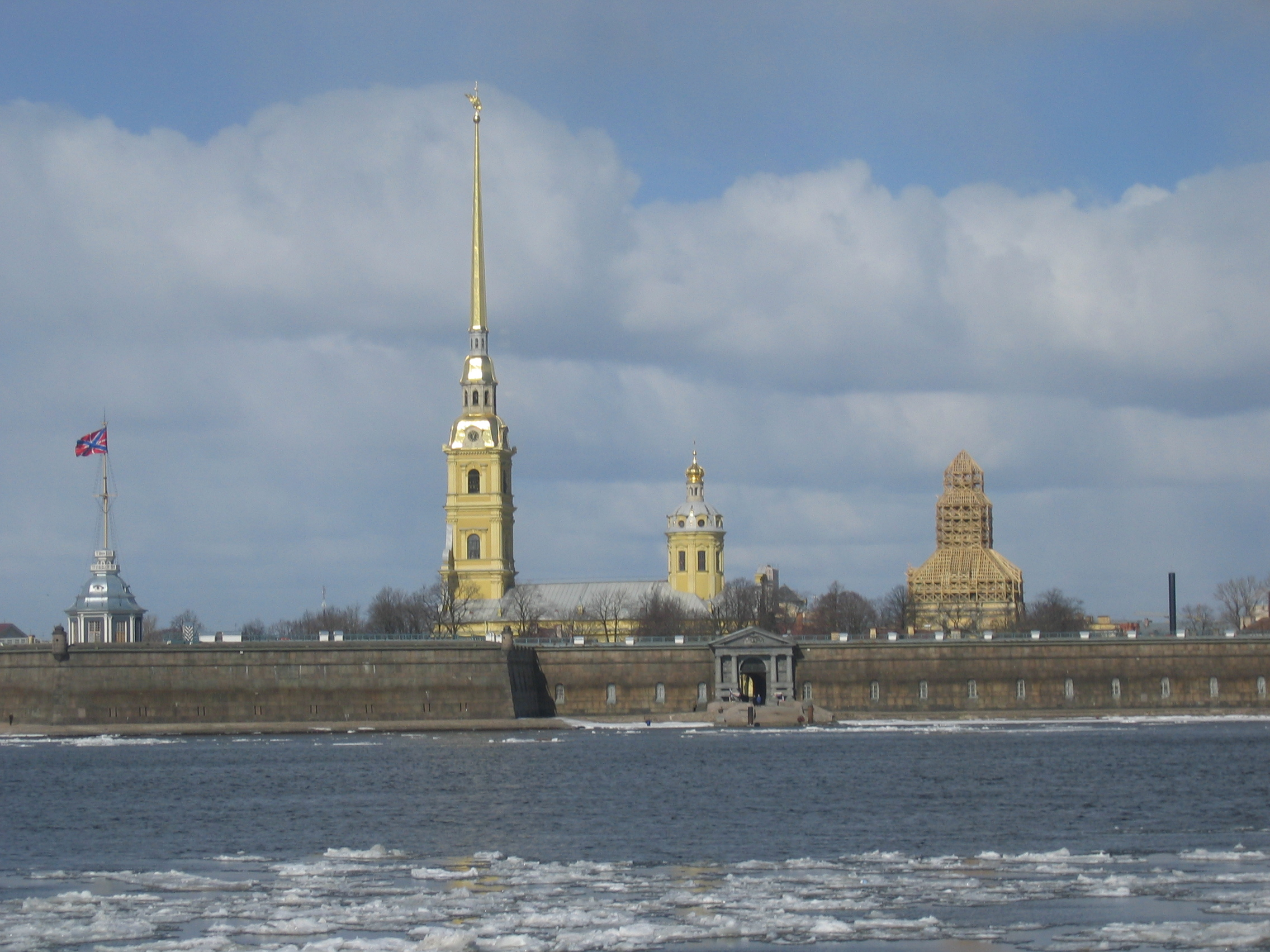
View across the Neva

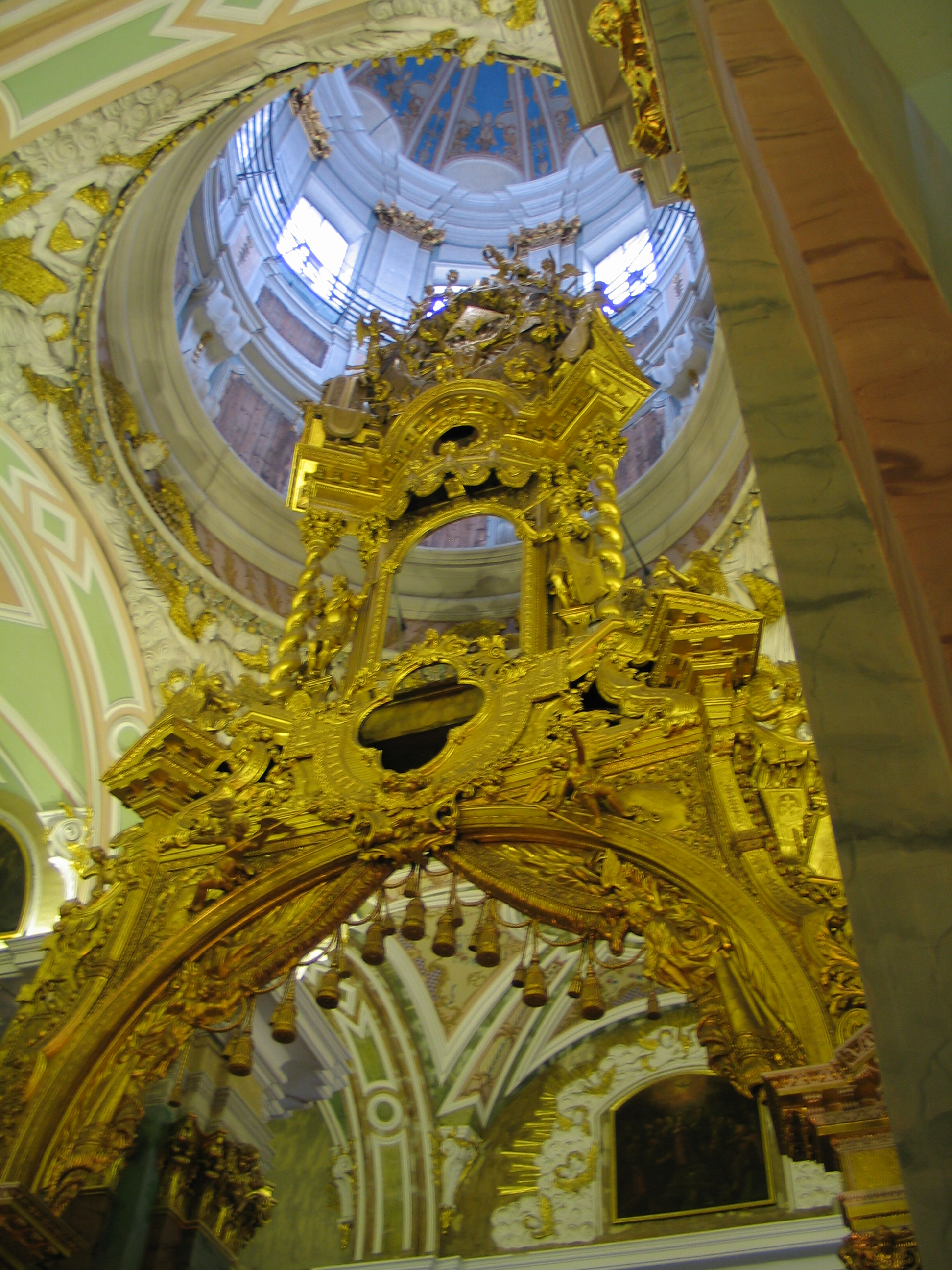
Upper portion of the iconostasis

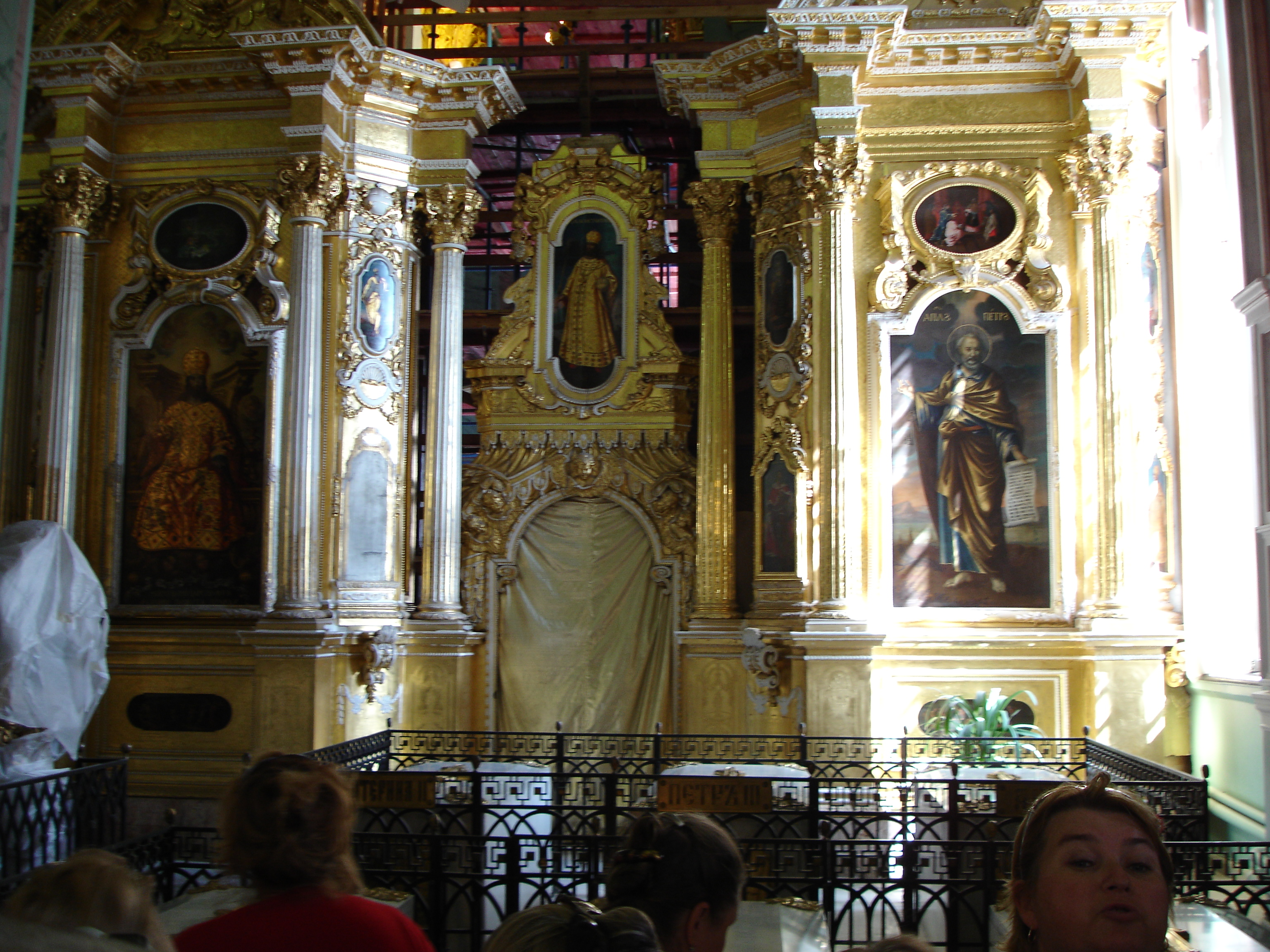
Holy Doors and lower portion of the iconostasis

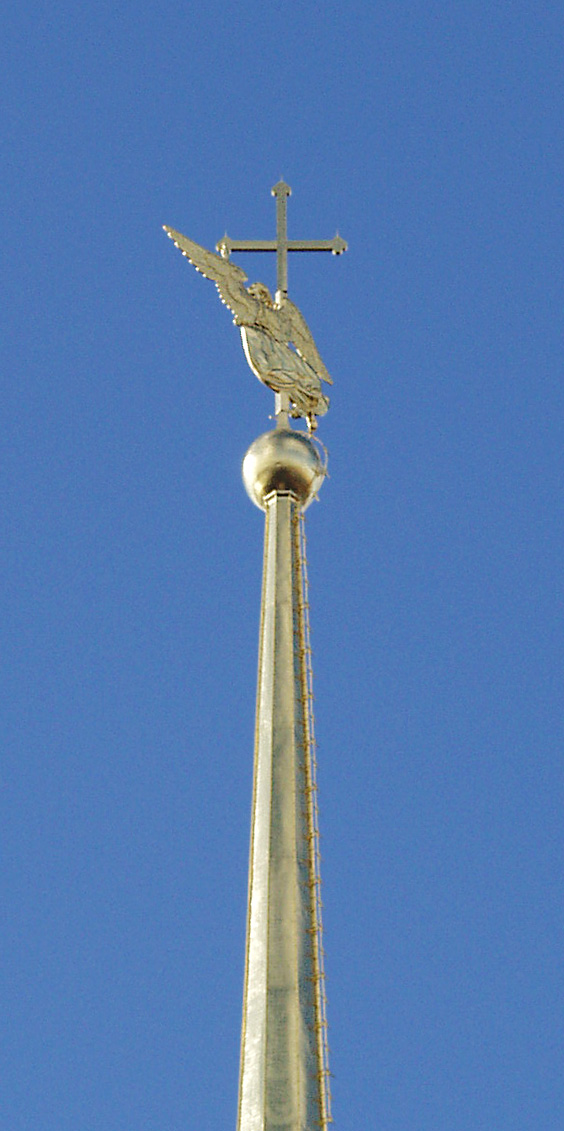
Spire

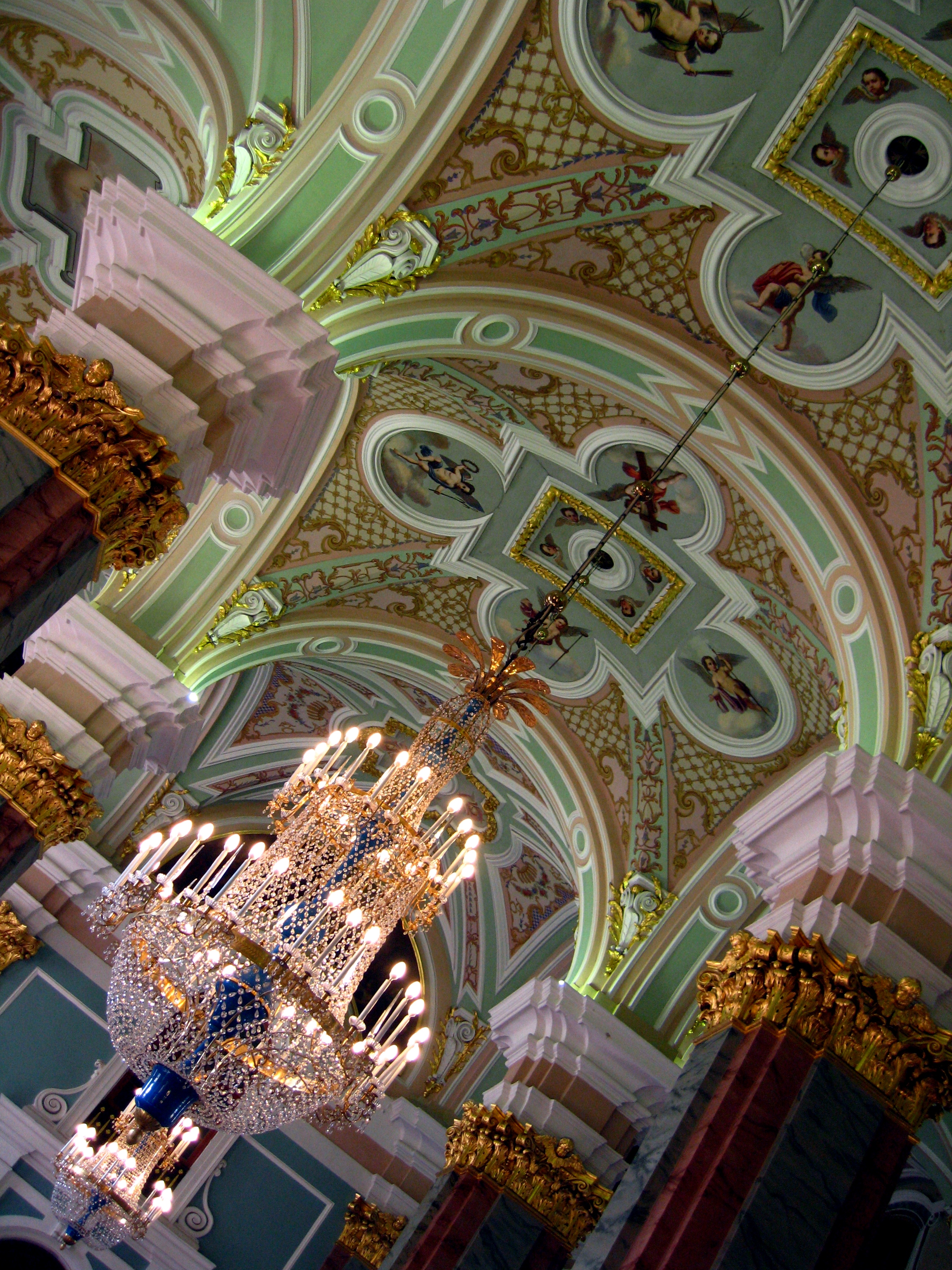
Mosaic ceiling and chandelier

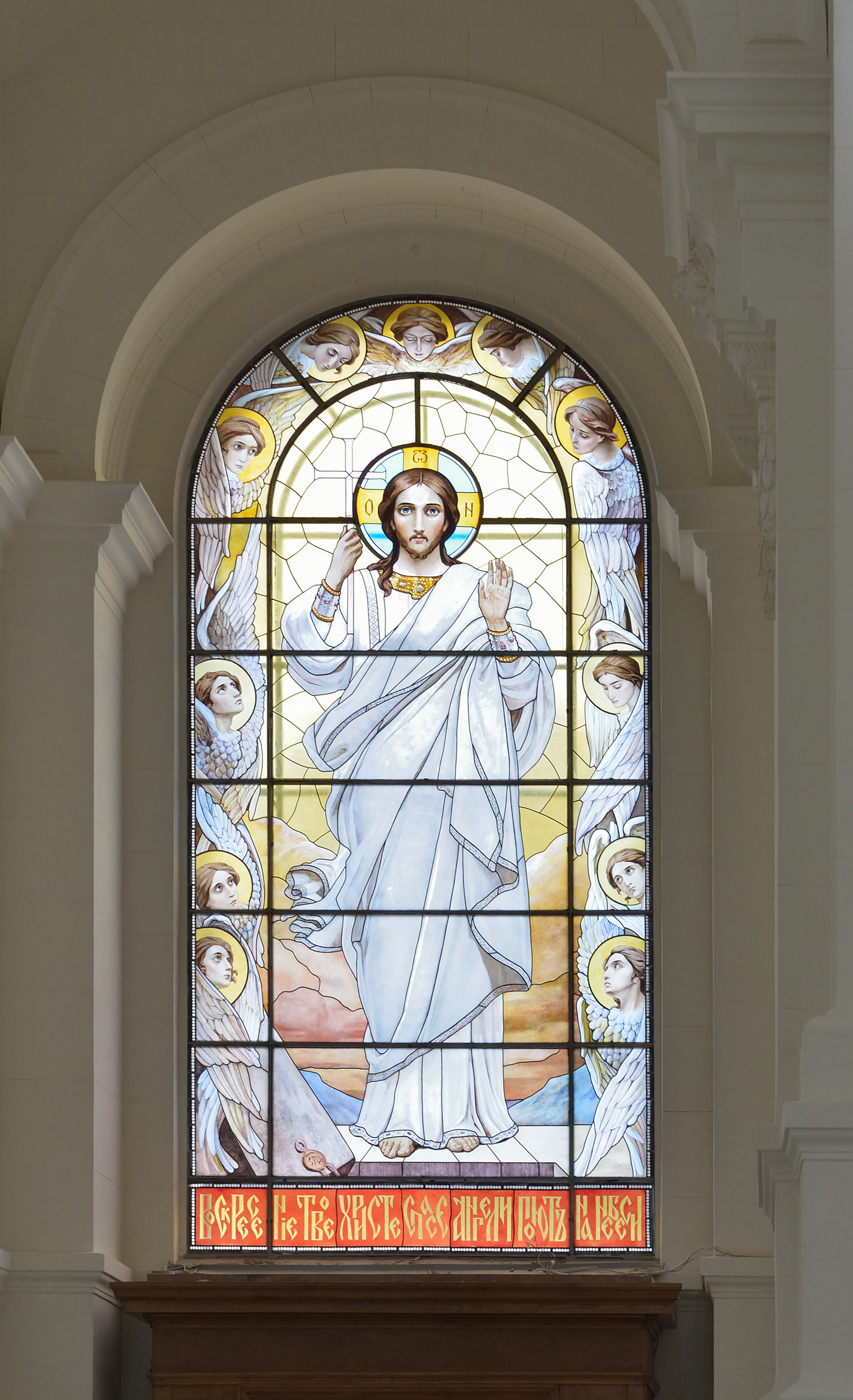
Stained glass window

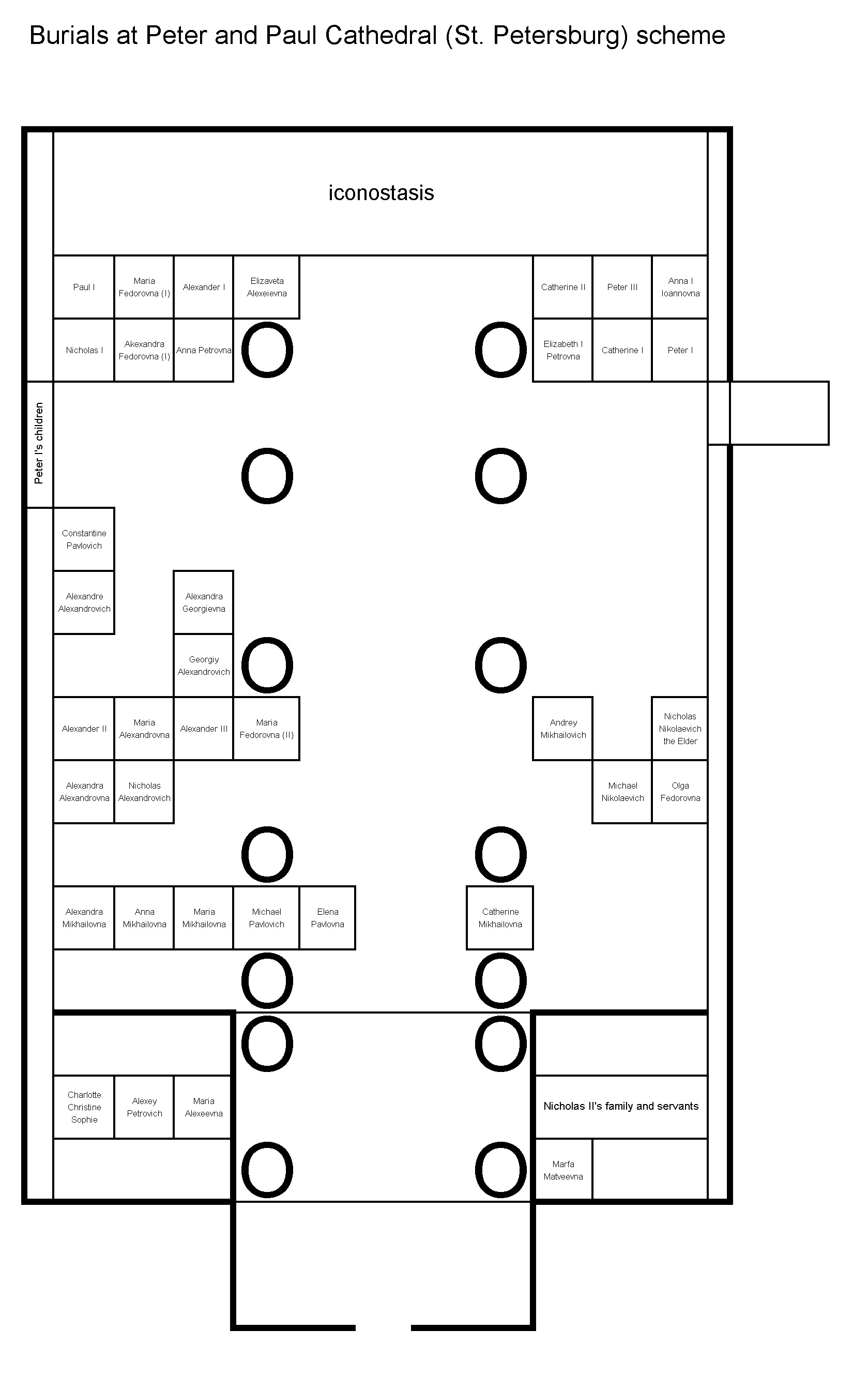
Scheme of tsars' graves

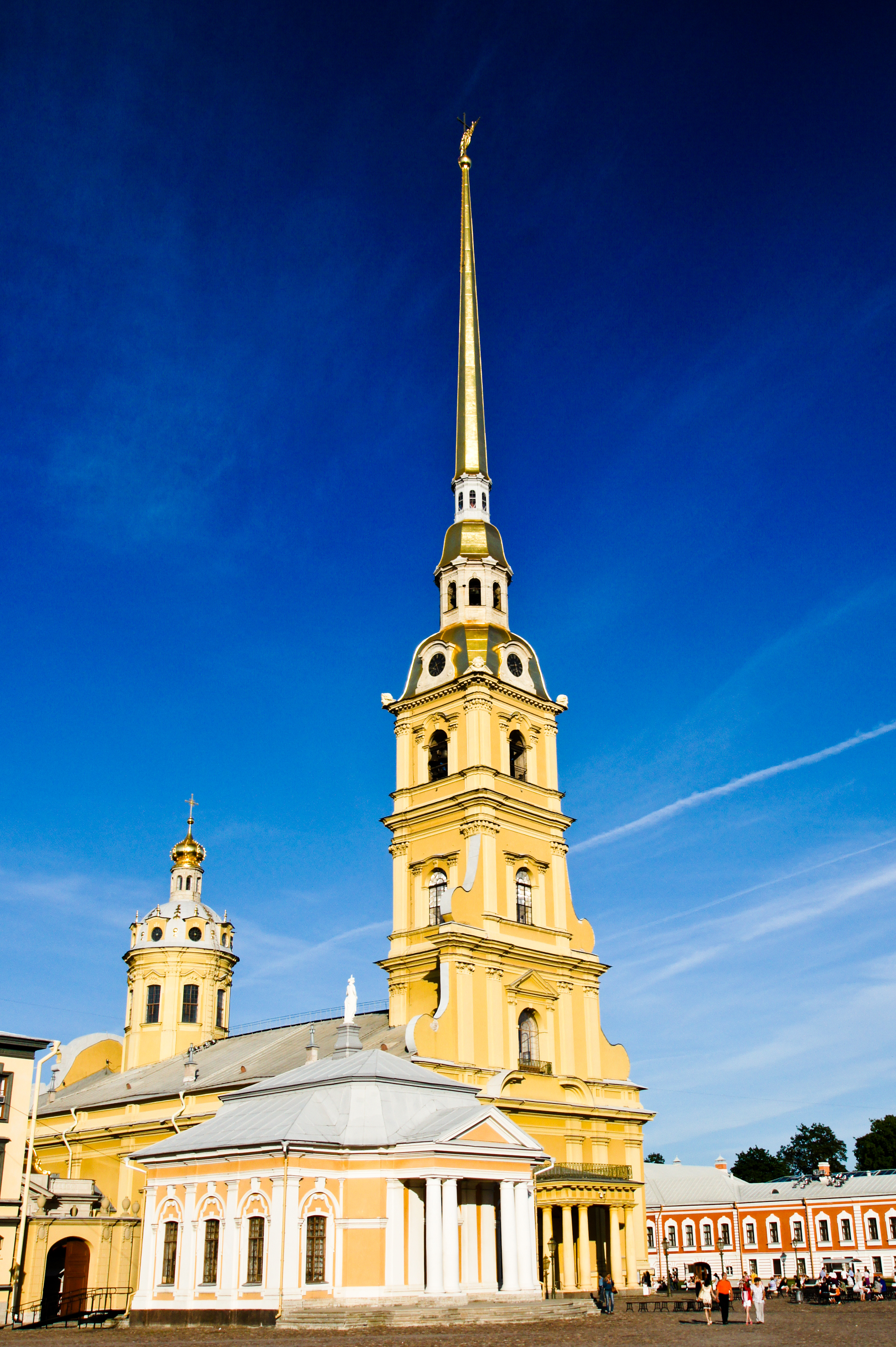
Saints Peter and Paul Cathedral, Saint Petersburg.

== See also ==
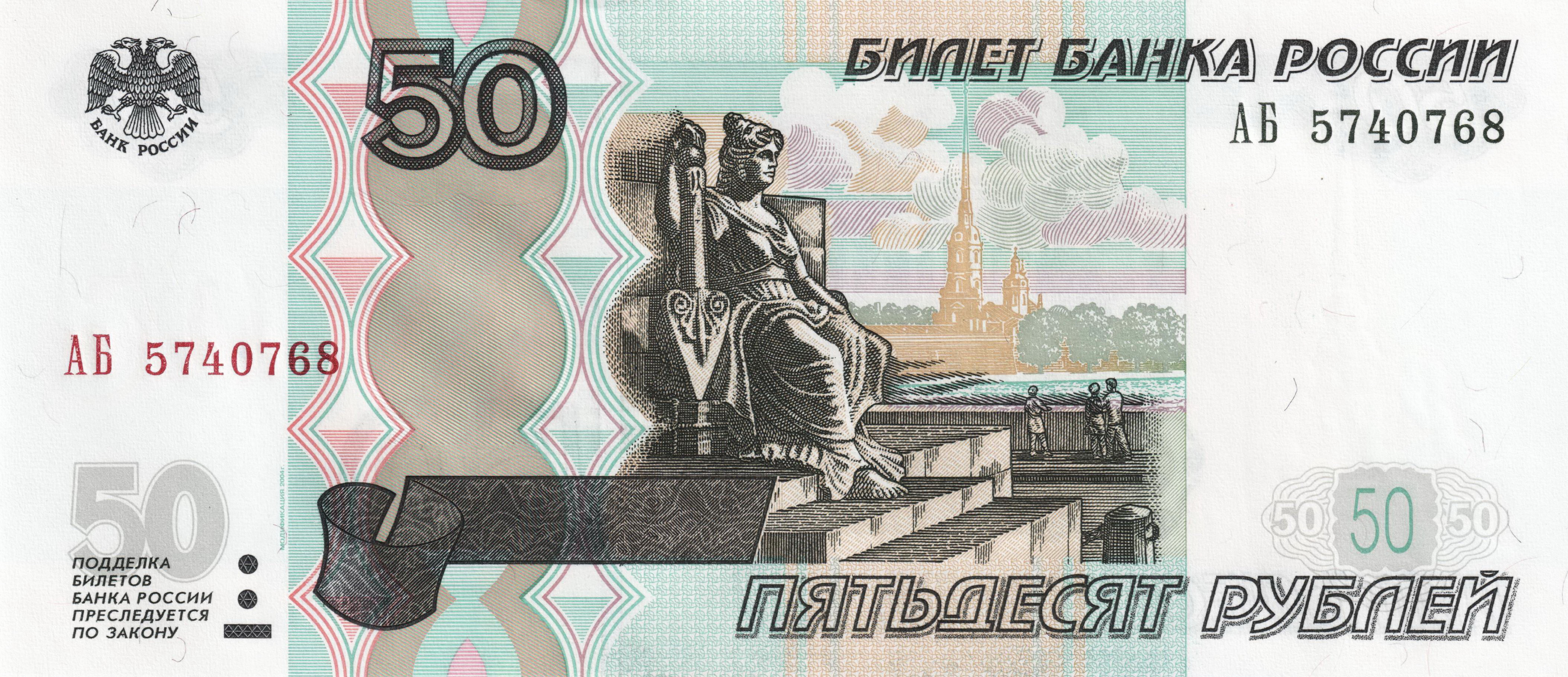
Rostral Column sculpture and the Peter and Paul Cathedral on a 50-ruble banknote (the cathedral is also a watermark)

- List of tallest Orthodox churches
- List of tallest structures built before the 20th century
- Category:Burials at Saints Peter and Paul Cathedral, Saint Petersburg

Records
Preceded by Ivan the Great Bell Tower	Tallest building in the Russian Empire and Soviet Union; 1733–1952; 122.5 m	Succeeded by Kotelnicheskaya Embankment Building
Preceded by Unknown	Tallest building in St. Petersburg; 1733–2017; 122.5 m	Succeeded by Lakhta Center
