= Domenico Trezzini =

Italian Swiss architect (c. 1670 – 1734)

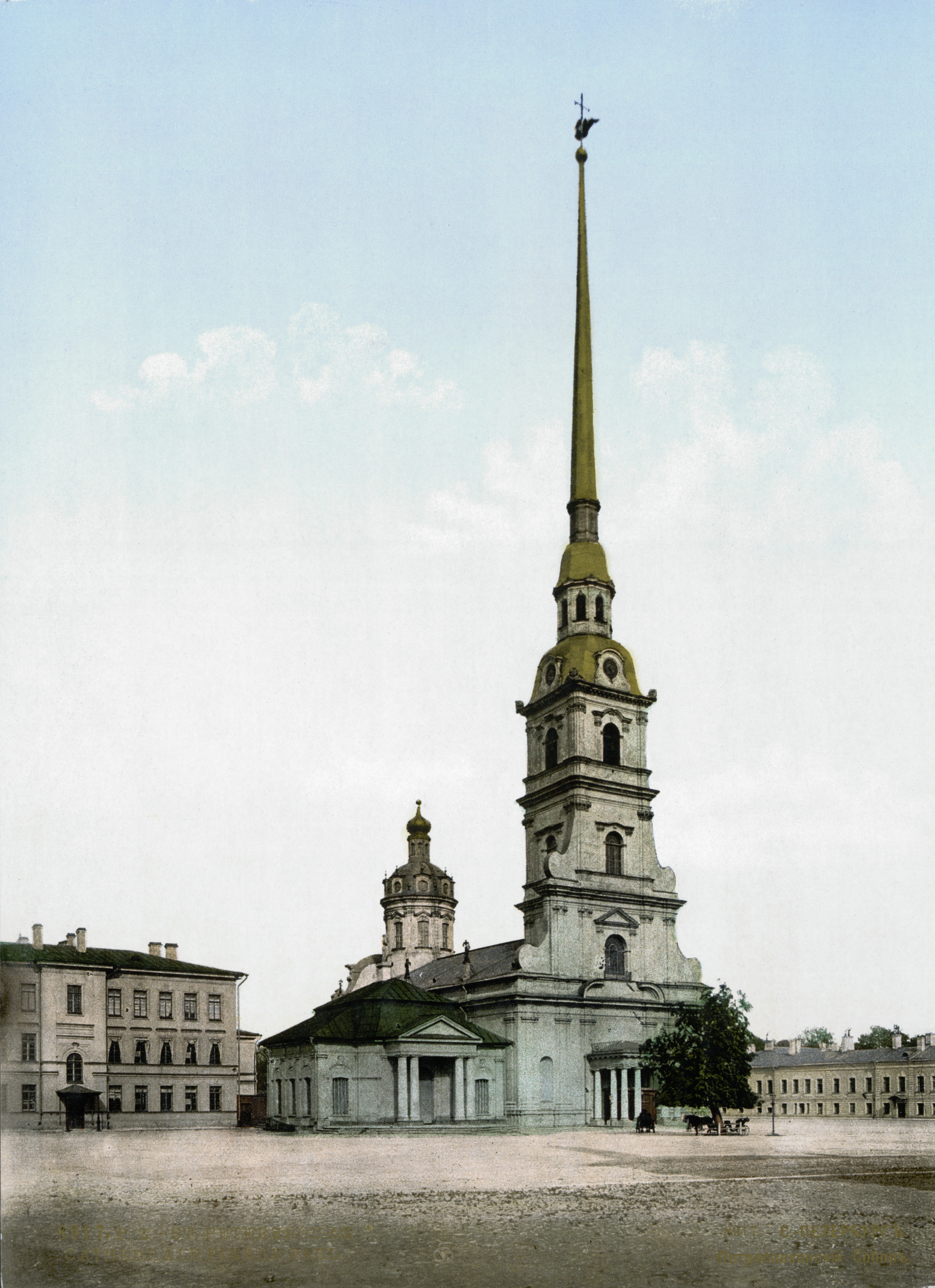
The Peter and Paul Cathedral in Saint Petersburg is the most celebrated work by Domenico Trezzini (image, 1896–97).

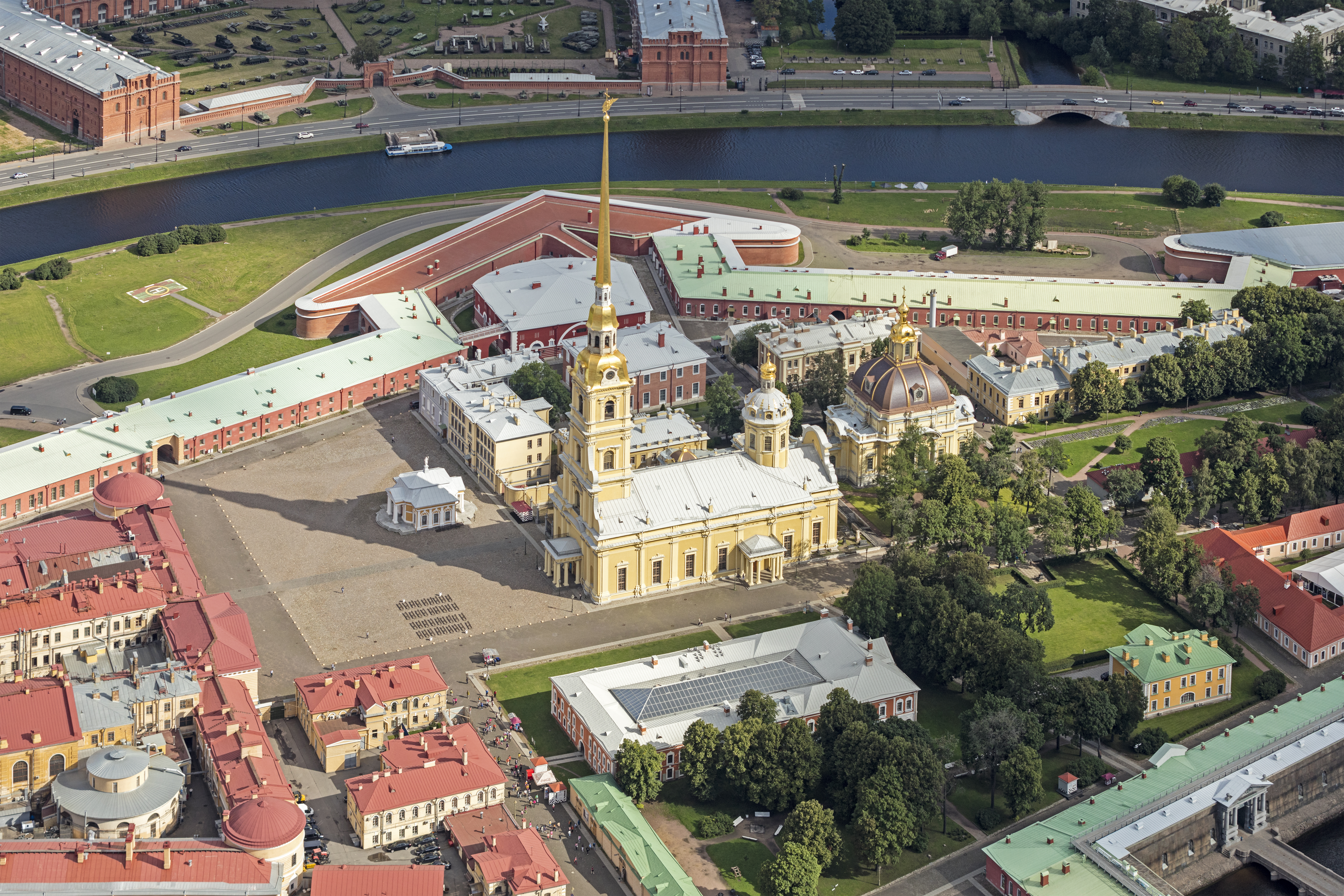
Aerial view of the Peter and Paul Cathedral (image, 2016)

Domenico Trezzini (Russian: Андрей Якимович Трезин, romanized: Andrey Yakimovich Trezin; c. 1670 – 1734) was an Italian Swiss architect who elaborated the Petrine Baroque style of Russian architecture.

== Biography ==
Domenico was born in Astano, Landvogtei of Lugano (at that time a condominium of the Old Swiss Confederacy), in the Italian-speaking Ticino. He probably studied in Rome. Subsequently, as he was working in Denmark, he was offered by Peter I of Russia, among other architects, to design buildings in the new Russian capital city, St. Petersburg.

From 1703, when the city was founded, he substantially contributed to its most representative buildings. The Peter and Paul Fortress with the Peter and Paul Cathedral, the Twelve Collegia Building (now the main building of Saint Petersburg University) as well as Peter's Summer House count among his many achievements. He also helped found and design Kronstadt and the Alexander Nevsky Monastery. Perhaps he participated in the construction of the main attraction in the south of the Moscow region, Znamenskaya Church in Dubrovitsy, built in 1704 by boyar Boris Alexeyevich Golitsyn.

Domenico Trezzini was very important for another aspect of Russian architectural history: in founding a school based on the European model, he laid the foundations for the development of the Petrine Baroque.

As a testimony of the cordial relationship that linked Domenico Trezzini with the tsar, his son Pietro (who also became a noted architect, not to be confused with Pietro Antonio Trezzini) had Peter I of Russia himself as a godfather.
