= Twelve Collegia =

Complex of historic buildings in St. Petersburg

Coordinates: 59.9416°N 30.2993°E

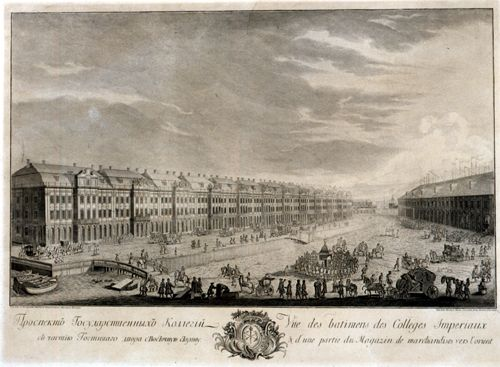
The Twelve Collegia building as it appears on a 1753 engraving.

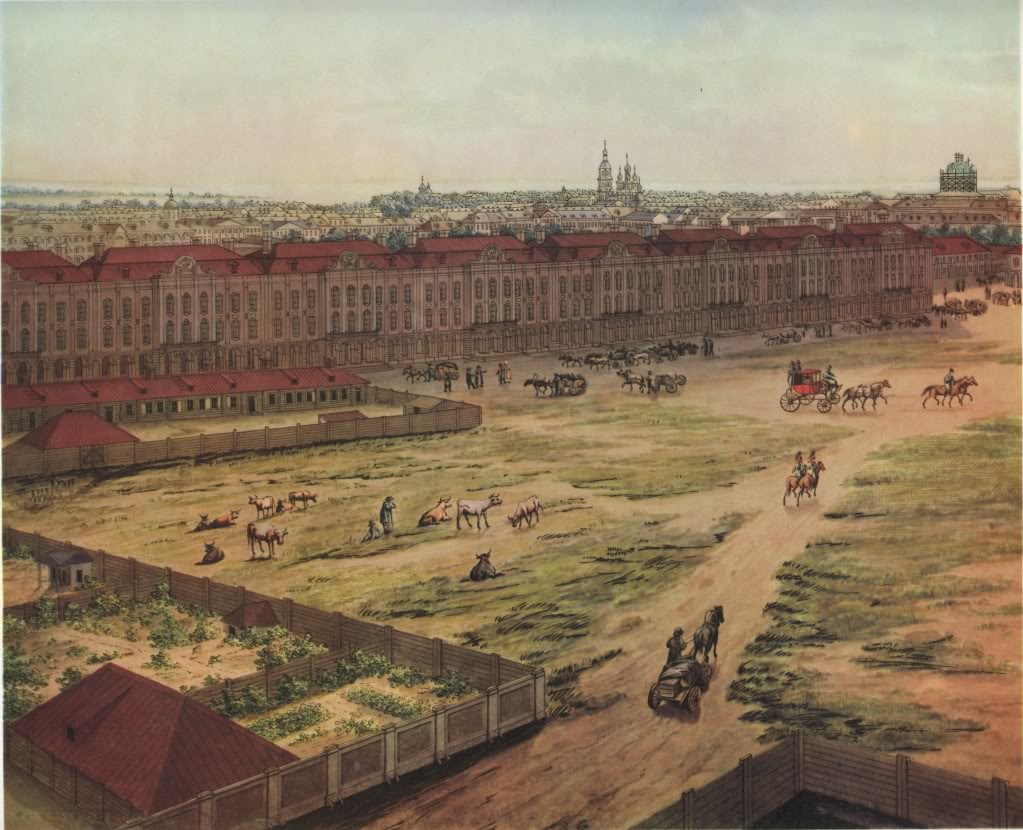
The Twelve Colleges in 1820

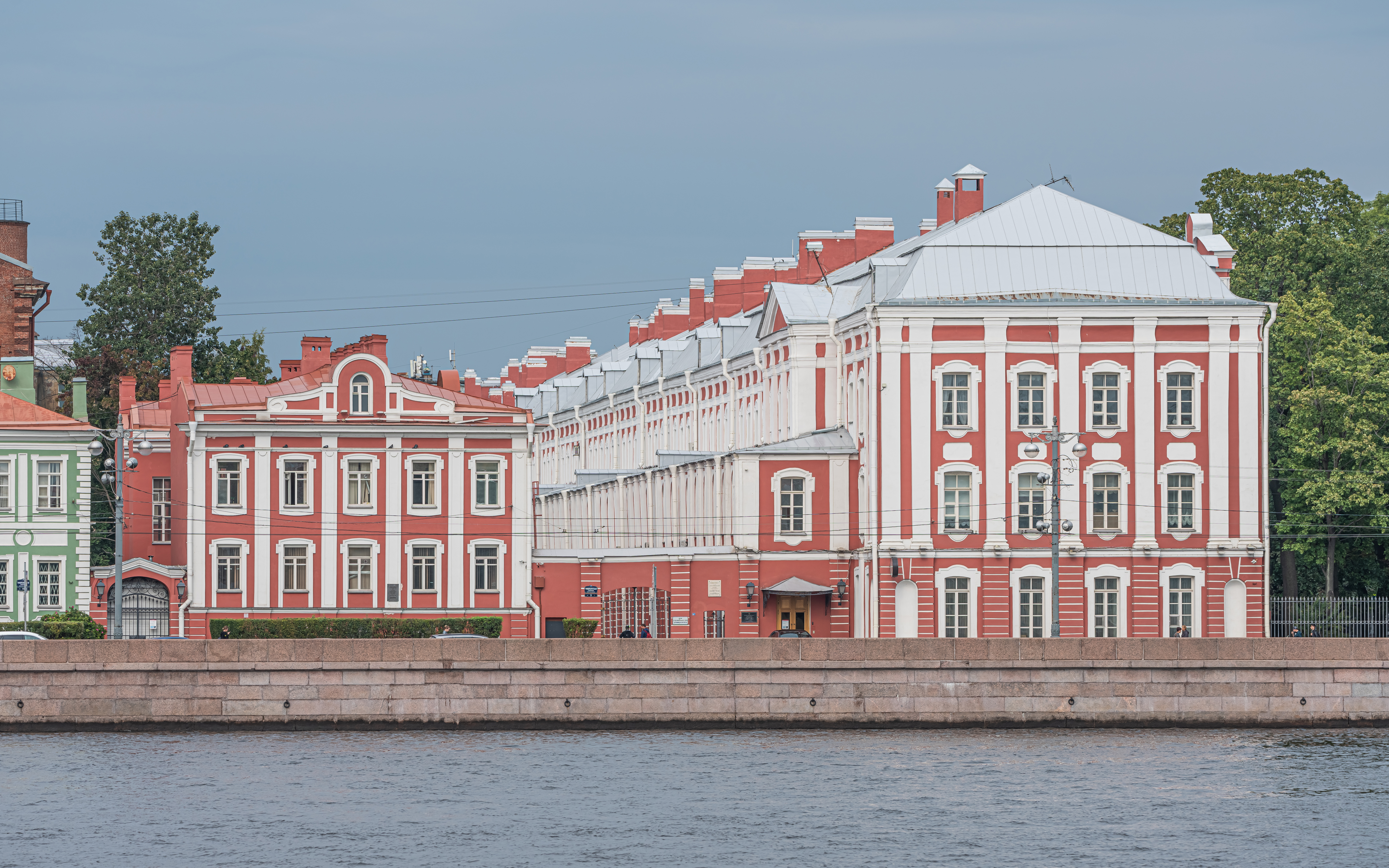
The historic building of the Twelve Collegia now houses the Saint Petersburg State University.

The Twelve Collegia or Twelve Colleges (Russian: Двeнaдцaть Коллегий) is the largest edifice from the Petrine era remaining in Saint Petersburg. It was designed by Domenico Trezzini and Theodor Schwertfeger and built from 1722 to 1744.

== Description ==
The three-story, red-brick complex of 12 buildings is 400–440 meters long, giving an illusion of one enormous edifice. The result is an "austerely structured" complex with a "rustic style". The original design separated the 12 individual buildings. In subsequent restructuring, they were connected to form the modern complex.

== History ==
The Twelve Collegia was commissioned by Peter the Great, who wanted a place for the Russian government, at the time divided into 12 branches:

- The Senate (created in February 1711, eventually renamed "Council of the Empire")
- The Most Holy Synod
- Nine colleges, which replaced the old prikazy system (subsequently replaced by Ministries in 1802 under the rule of Alexander I): Foreign Affairs, Revenue Collection, Justice, Expenditure, Financial Control, War, Admiralty, Commerce, Mining and Manufacturing
- Additional, or tenth college/ministry for trade

== Modern use ==
Twelve Collegia presently serves as one of three Petrine Baroque structures for Saint Petersburg State University. The Twelve Collegia are the headquarters of the university, which was founded in 1819 (it claims to be the successor of the Academy of St. Petersburg, and dates its foundation to 1724), stands along Mendeleevskaya Line on Vasilievsky Island.
