= Petrine Baroque =

Russian architectural style

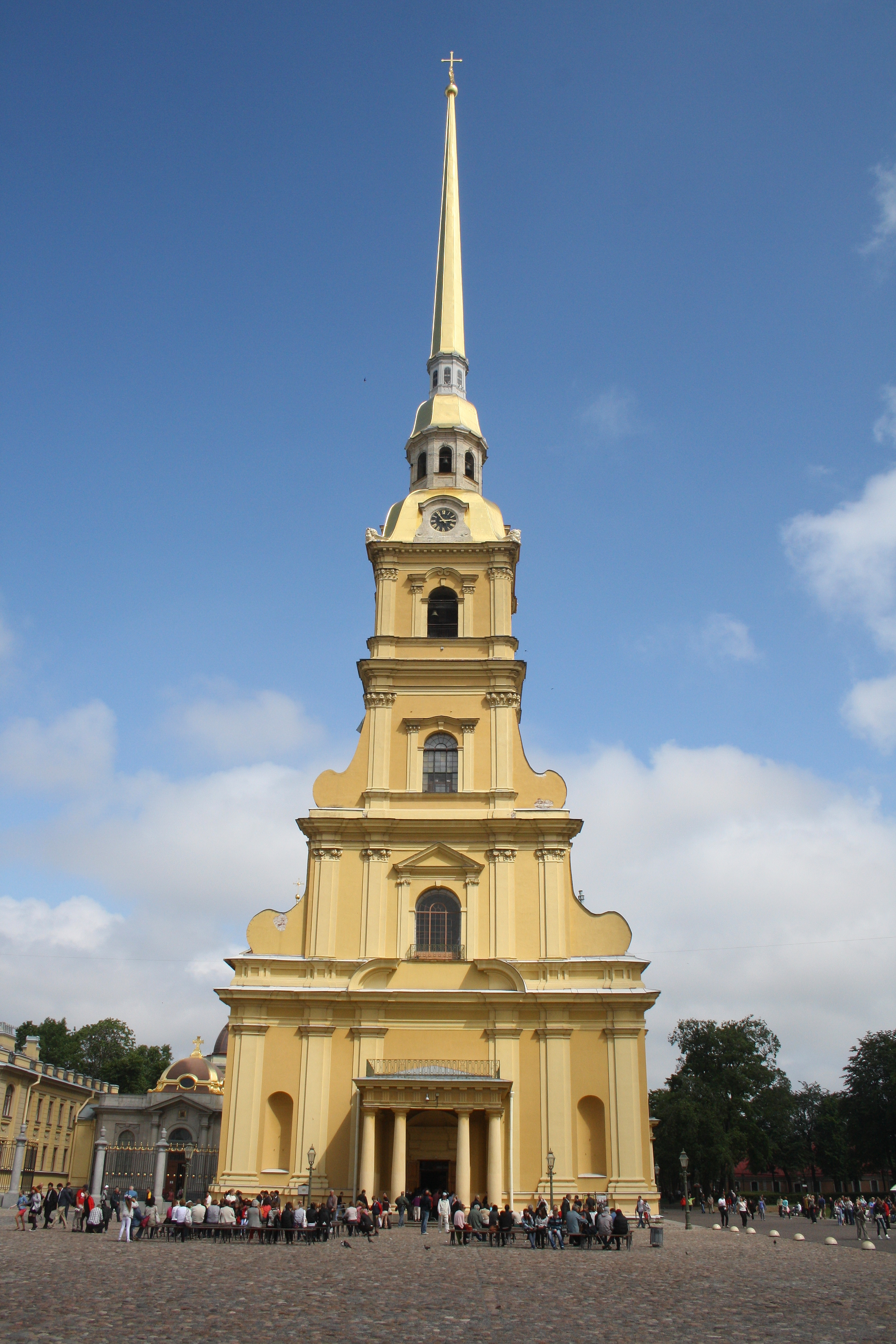
The Saints Peter and Paul Cathedral by architect Domenico Trezzini exists as it was originally designed. It is regarded as the most notable example of the Petrine Baroque style of architecture.

Petrine Baroque (Russian: Петровское барокко) is a style of 17th and 18th century Baroque architecture and decoration favoured by Peter the Great and employed to design buildings in the newly founded Russian capital, Saint Petersburg, under this monarch and his immediate successors.

Different from contemporary Naryshkin Baroque, favoured in Moscow, the Petrine Baroque represented a dramatic departure from Byzantine traditions that had dominated Russian architecture for almost a millennium. Its chief practitioners - Domenico Trezzini, Andreas Schlüter, and Mikhail Zemtsov - drew inspiration from a rather modest Dutch, Danish, and Swedish architecture of the time.

== Notable examples ==
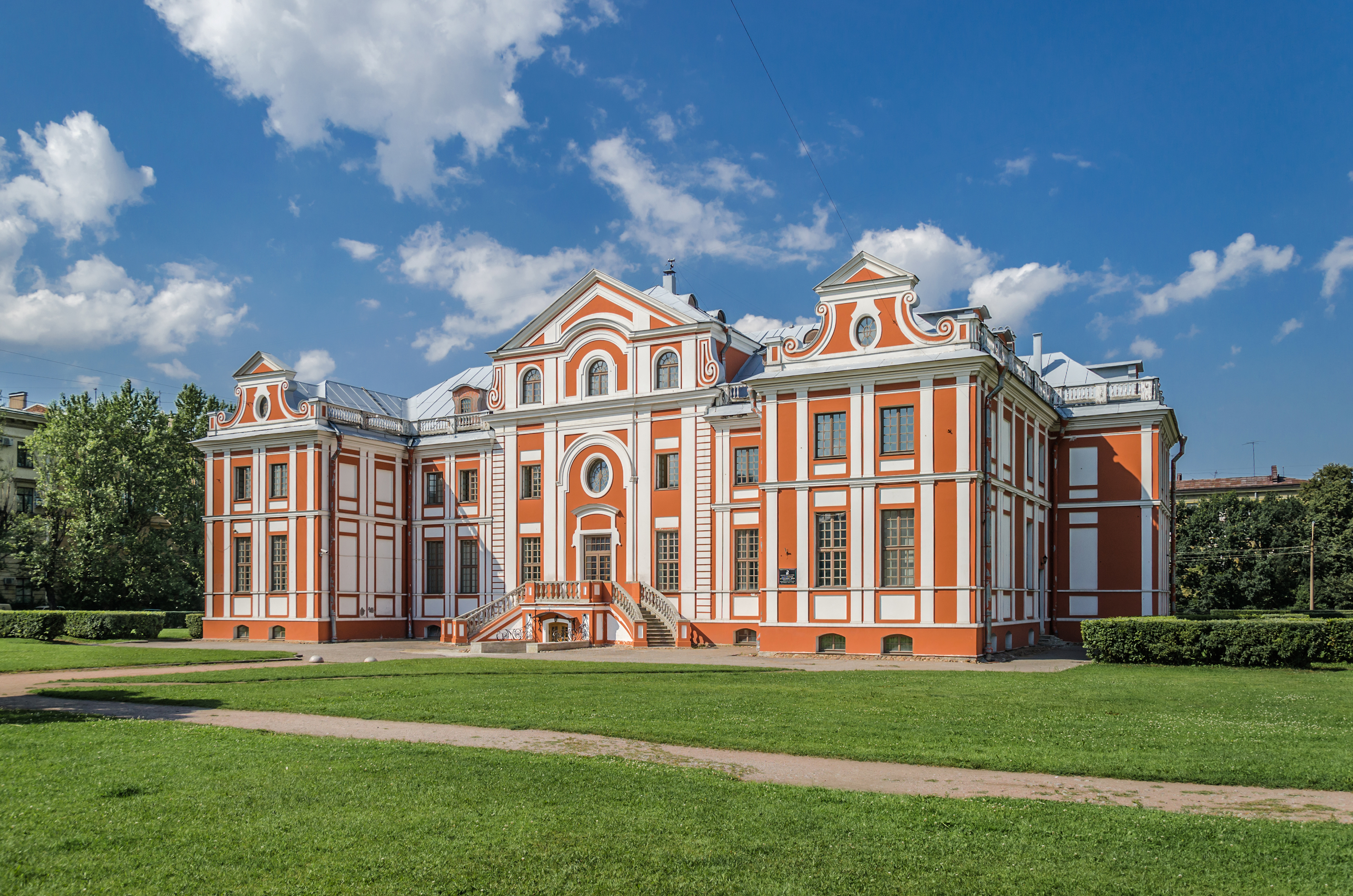
Kikin Hall (1714), an example of private residence dating from Peter I's reign.

Extant examples of the style in St Petersburg are the Peter and Paul Cathedral (Trezzini), the Twelve Colleges (Trezzini), the Kunstkamera (Georg Johann Mattarnovi), Kikin Hall (Schlüter) and Menshikov Palace (Giovanni Fontana).

The Petrine Baroque structures outside St. Petersburg are scarce; they include the Menshikov Tower in Moscow and Kadriorg Palace in Tallinn

== Architectural influences on Peter the Great ==
Peter the Great, also known as Peter I, served as the tsar of Russia from 1682–1725. He was the first Russian monarch to travel outside of Russia and this travel exposed him to the architecture of many other countries. His own library contained architectural books from the Netherlands, France, Germany and Italy. The buildings of these countries influenced Peter's taste in architecture as he set forward to build the new Russian capital of St. Petersburg. Peter had a very specific idea of what he wanted this new city to look like in terms of architectural style, and he took initiative in recruiting people who could help accomplish his vision and researching architectural styles. While in rule, Peter attempted to bring about change to the nation of Russia as quickly as possible and tried to incorporate western style and tradition into the everyday lives of his citizens. As part of this, Peter put regulations into effect, which mandated what cities should look like.

Peter's original goal for St. Petersburg was to re-create the city of Amsterdam. As the city began construction, Peter started making changes to the designs of the buildings, often altering the planned appearance of buildings once their construction had already started. These last minute alterations led to buildings not belonging to one particular architectural school.

=== Naryshkin Baroque style ===
Peter was raised in Moscow, lived at the Kremlin, and spent time at multiple royal estates outside of the city. His father Alexis died when he was four years old, so Peter had a fairly unsupervised youth to pursue his own passions. Peter developed his taste for architecture by looking at the buildings which surrounded him in his childhood, many of which were patronized by his family. These churches and houses which surrounded Moscow reflected European influence in their structure and decoration. The Moscow or Naryshkin Baroque style, named after Peter's maternal side of the family, was prominent in these buildings. Characteristic of the Naryshkin Baroque are large scale buildings and lack of wood amongst building materials.

=== Dutch Baroque style ===
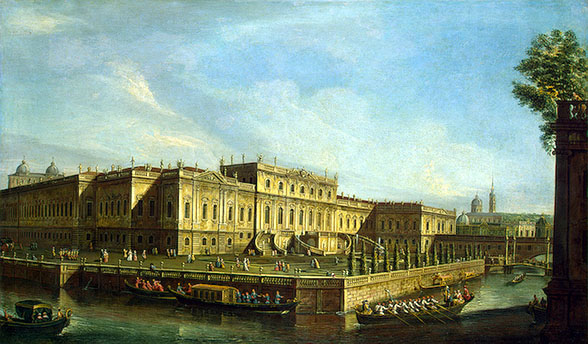
The Summer Palace

As Peter entered young adulthood and spent time travelling, his architectural taste began to favor the elements of Dutch architecture. Peter met with the Dutch architect Simon Schijnvoet (sometimes Schynvoet or Schynvaet) in 1697. Schijnvoet specialized in Dutch Baroque but also taught Peter about naval architecture. The cabin in St. Petersburg that Peter designed utilized elements from this naval style which Schjinvoet taught him, including flat, painted log walls, wooden tile-like shingles, and windows made from small planes of glass. These elements of design were unlike the Russian styles seen up until this point.

The Russian history scholar James Cracraft suggests that the clearest example of Dutch architecture designed under Peter's rule was his Summer Palace in St. Petersburg, while there was also Monplaisir Palace, also known as the "Little Dutch House". In a 1724 letter to the architectural student Ivan Korobov, Peter discusses his preference for the ornamentation of Dutch Baroque. In this same letter, Peter conveys his disinterest for the architectural styles of the French and Italian due to its lack of adornment and use of stone rather than brick. Among Peter's papers, a note was found describing how he sent two Russian architecture students to Holland so that they could learn the Dutch Baroque style and come back to build churches and houses for St. Petersburg. In addition to having Russian students train abroad, Peter also hired Dutch architects to come and work on projects in Russia.

=== Other styles ===
While Peter preferred the Dutch Baroque style, he also sought out architectural inspiration from other countries. Despite his recorded dislike for the French and Italian Baroque architecture, Peter sent two architectural students to Rome in 1723 to replace another two students working there. Scholars suggest that an equal amount of architectural students were sent to Holland and Italy during his reign and more Italian builders worked on projects for Peter in Russia than Dutch builders did. In the early years of St. Petersburg, the French served as prominent designers and decorators.

== Notable architects ==
=== Domenico Trezzini ===
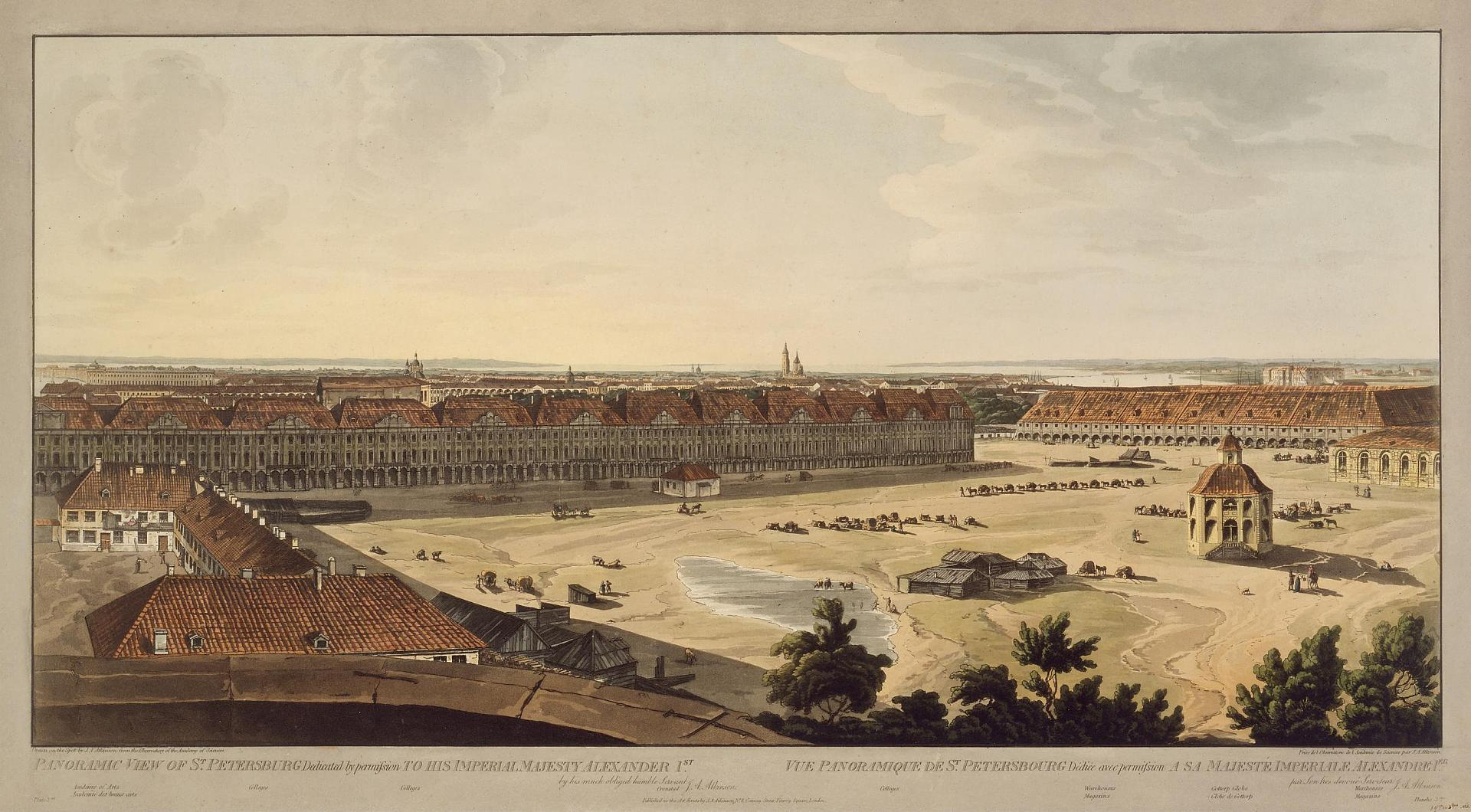
The Twelve Colleges, Construction began by Trezzini in 1722

Domenico Trezzini was born in Italian-speaking region of Switzerland in 1670. The architects that surrounded him in his youth were responsible for the development of the Baroque style in southern Germany. Trezzini's architectural style has visible influences from this German Baroque style along with the northern style of Baroque architecture that he picked up during his time living in Copenhagen. Trezzini was also influenced by the Lombard Baroque style of architecture which was popular in Northern Italy where he grew up during the 17th century. From 1703 until his death in 1734, Trezzini lived in St. Petersburg. Trezzini began many of the building projects that formed the basis of the city. Due to the many projects that Trezzini worked on, he was given the title of "Lieutenant-Colonel of Fortification and Architect" in 1710.

Some of Trezzini's major additions to the city include: Peter the Great's Summer Palace, the Alexander Nevsky Lavra, the Twelve Colleges, and the Saints Peter and Paul Cathedral. Trezzini and his team designed the layout of the developing St. Petersburg including the streets of the anticipated city center of Vasilyevsky Island. The layout of the city was arranged in a grid format with perpendicular streets and canals. Trezzini's design of the city did not follow the European ideal at the time because of its lack of compactness and grid organization rather than the traditional ringed layout.

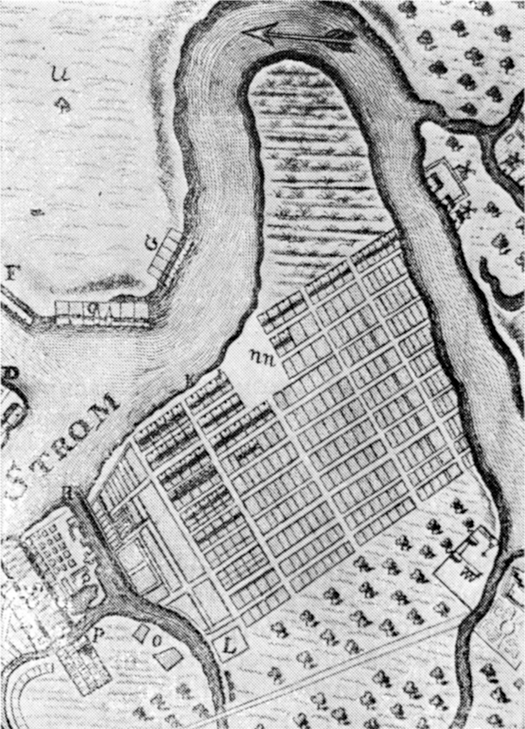
A fragment from Trezzini's 1720 design for the layout of St. Petersburg.

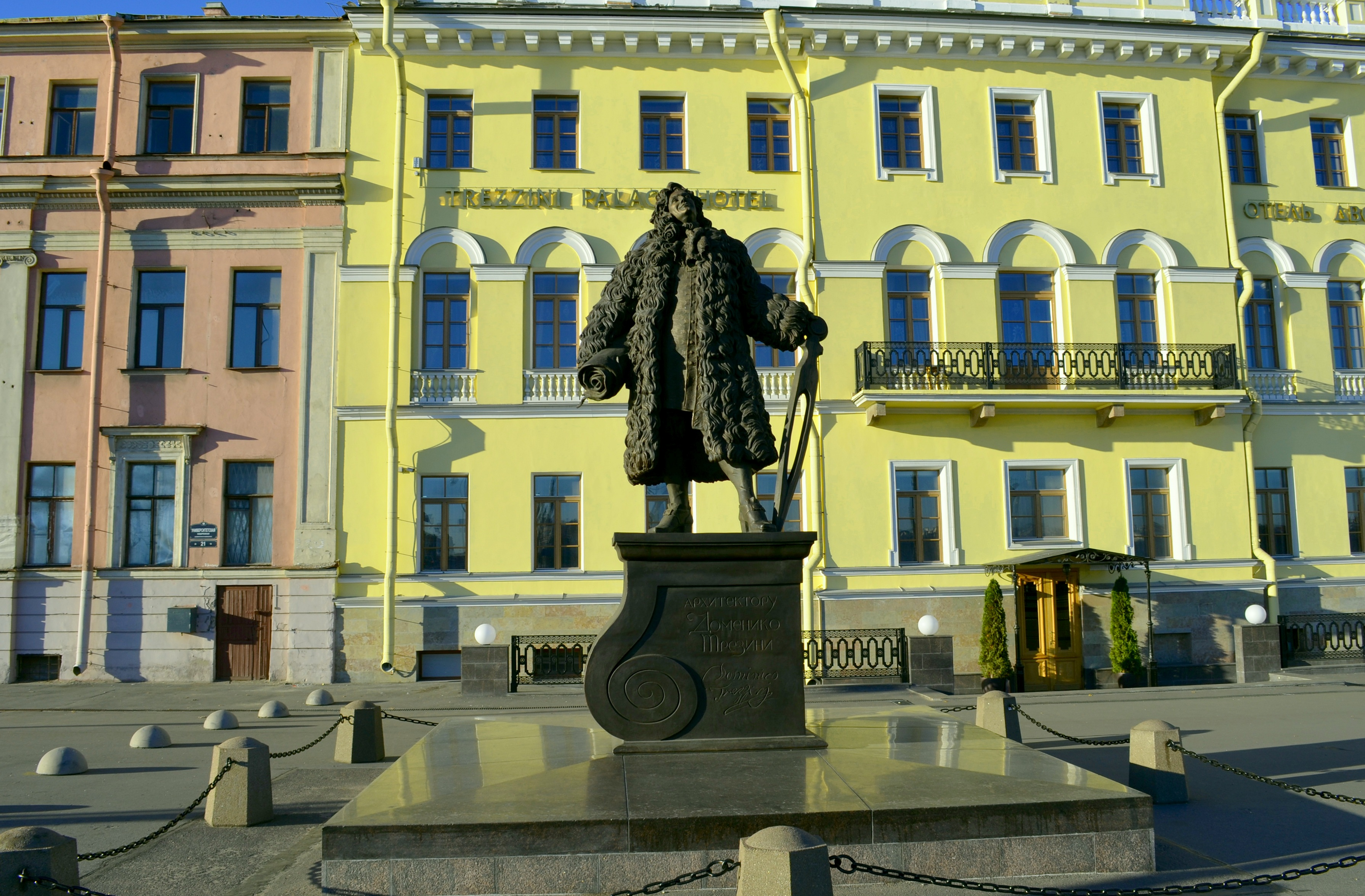
The Trezzini Monument in St. Petersburg

In 1714, Peter declared that all houses in St. Petersburg should be constructed after Trezzini's model home. Different versions of the home were created for different classes of citizens based on their rank. Peter classified all citizens into 14 different classes, all of which had different residential areas in Trezzini plan. The size of the citizen's home directly corresponded to their standing in this social ranking. The lower classes were divided by their trades and the upper classes were divided by the amount of serfs that they controlled. Several engravings of the model homes exist and while they are often accredited to Trezzini himself, his assistant Jean-Baptiste Alexandre Le Blond is responsible for creating them. These plans dictated the ornamentation style of the homes and the materials that they would be built with belonging to each class of citizens. In the city center proper, these guidelines were adhered to strictly. The further from the city center, the more flexibility with the design of homes there was. Despite the effort put into maintaining a regulated city design, after Peter's death, the system that Trezzini designed fell to the wayside. Scholars consider Peter I's comprehensive urban design to be one of his greatest legacies.

In the design of his buildings, the Dutch Baroque style is visible in the types of ornamentation he preferred. For columns, Trezzini preferred squared pilasters as a decorative element and restricted their use to where they were structurally necessary or served a major purpose in the overall design. Trezzini also took inspiration from the work of Christopher Wren, whose work on the St Paul's Cathedral appears in Trezzini's sketches.

Trezzini established the St. Petersburg Chancellery of Construction and became its first director. This school was the first institution to offer formal training for architects in Russia. Among those who trained at the Chancellery was Mikhail Zemtsov who continued Trezzini's legacy. Other architects whom Trezzini worked alongside during his life and continued the construction of his buildings after his death were Carlo Giuseppe and Pietro Antonio Trezzini.

Examples of Trezzini's architectural contributions
Summer Palace of Peter I by Dominico Trezzini	Peter-Paul Church by Dominico Trezzini	One of the buildings from the Twelve Colleges by Dominico Trezzini	Twelve Colleges by Dominico Trezzini	Troekurov's House by Dominico Trezzini

=== Giovanni Maria Fontana ===
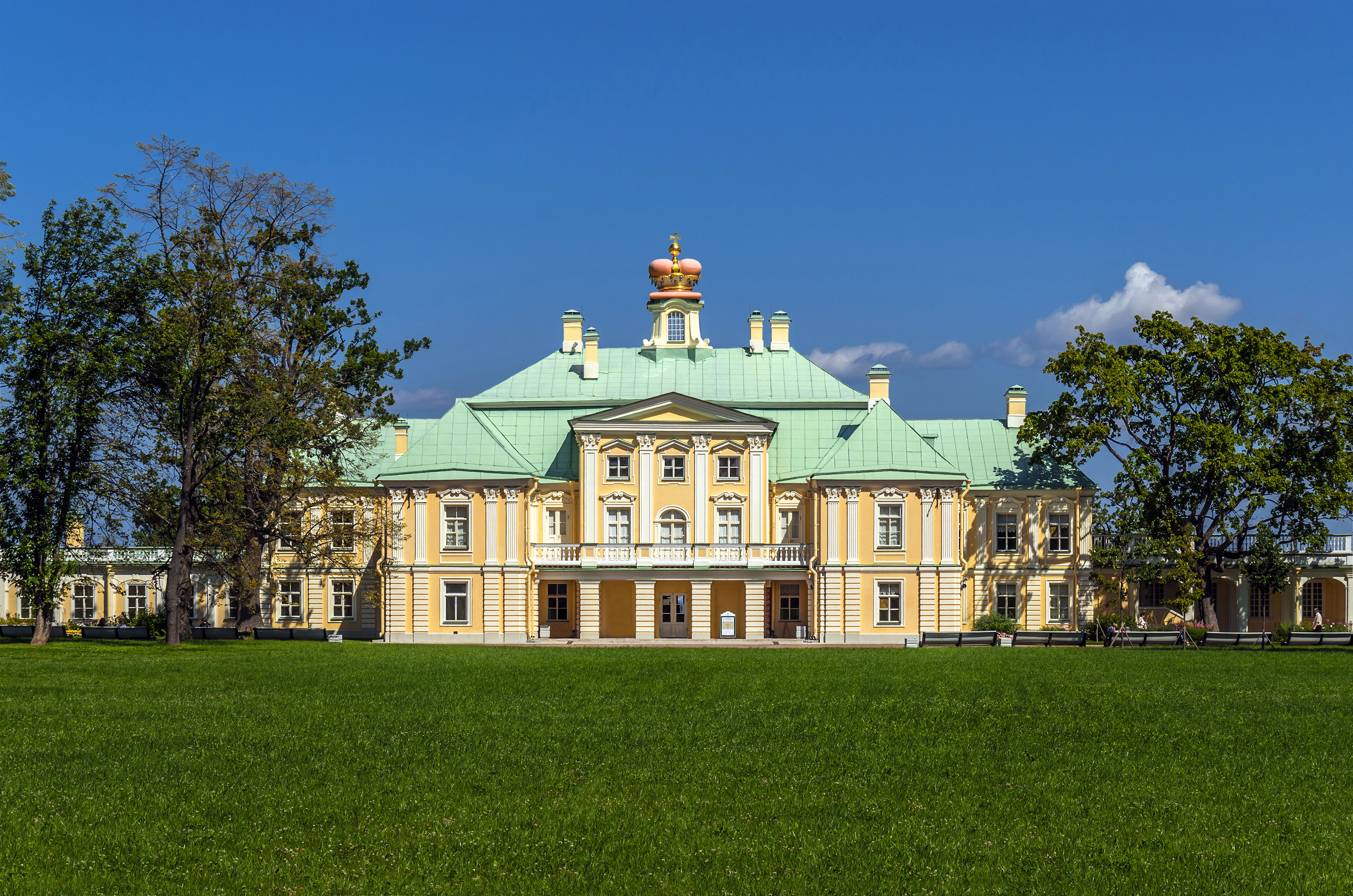
The main building of the Grand Menshikovsky Palace in Oranienbaum, Russia designed by Giovanni Maria Fontana.

=== Mikhail Zemtsov ===
Examples of Zemtsov's architectural contributions

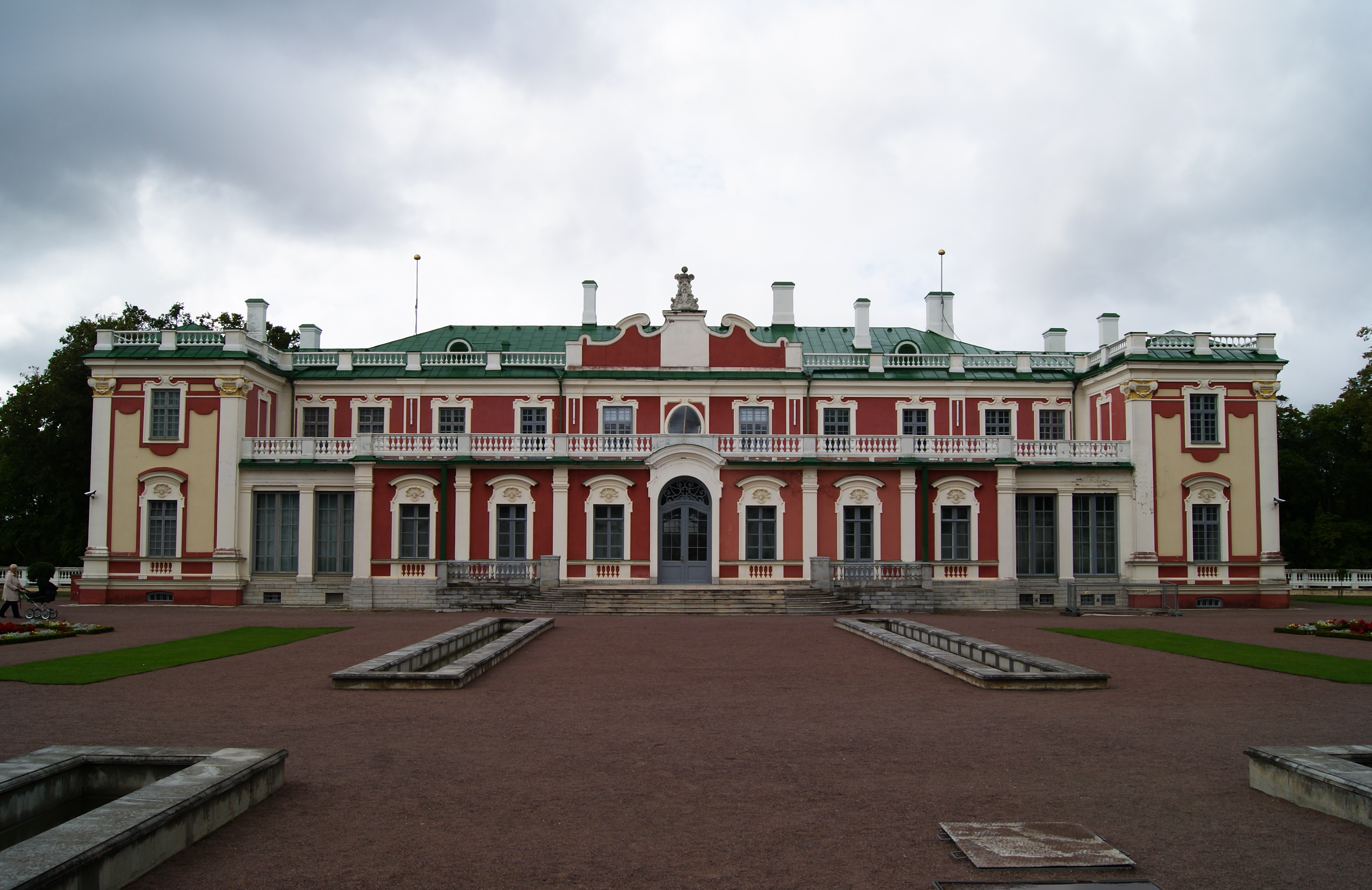
Kadriorg Palace by Mikhail Zemtsov

=== Francesco Bartolomeo Rastrelli ===
Examples of Rastrelli's architectural contributions
Grand Peterhof Palace by Francesco Bartolomeo Rastrelli	Grand Church of Peterhof Palace by Francesco Bartolomeo Rastrelli	Hermitage Pavilion by Francesco Bartolomeo Rastrelli

=== Georg Johann Mattarnovi ===
Examples of Mattarnovi's architectural contributions

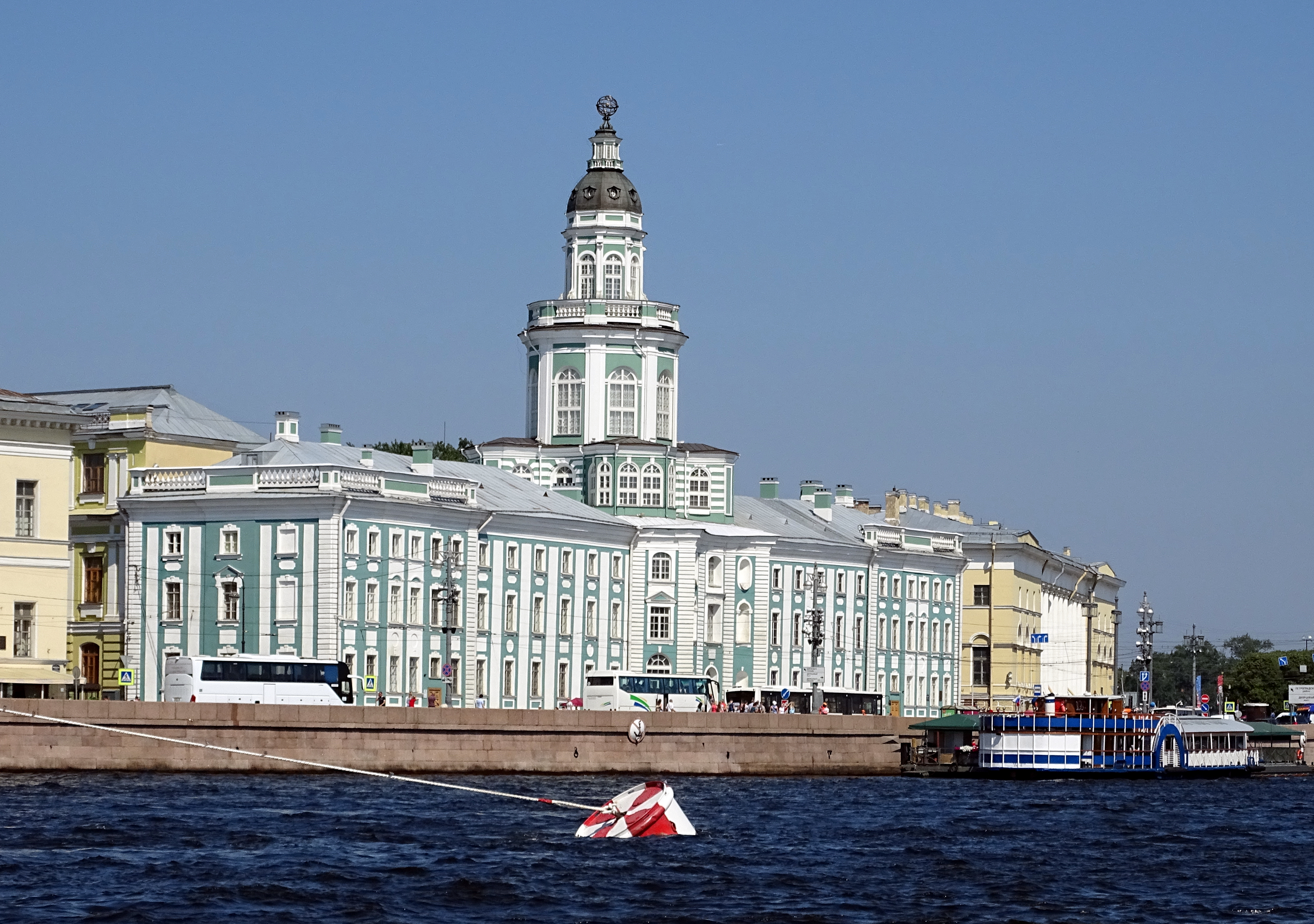
The Kunstkamera museum by Georg Johann Mattarnovi

== See also ==
- Elizabethan Baroque
