= Georg Johann Mattarnovi =

German Baroque architect (died 1719)

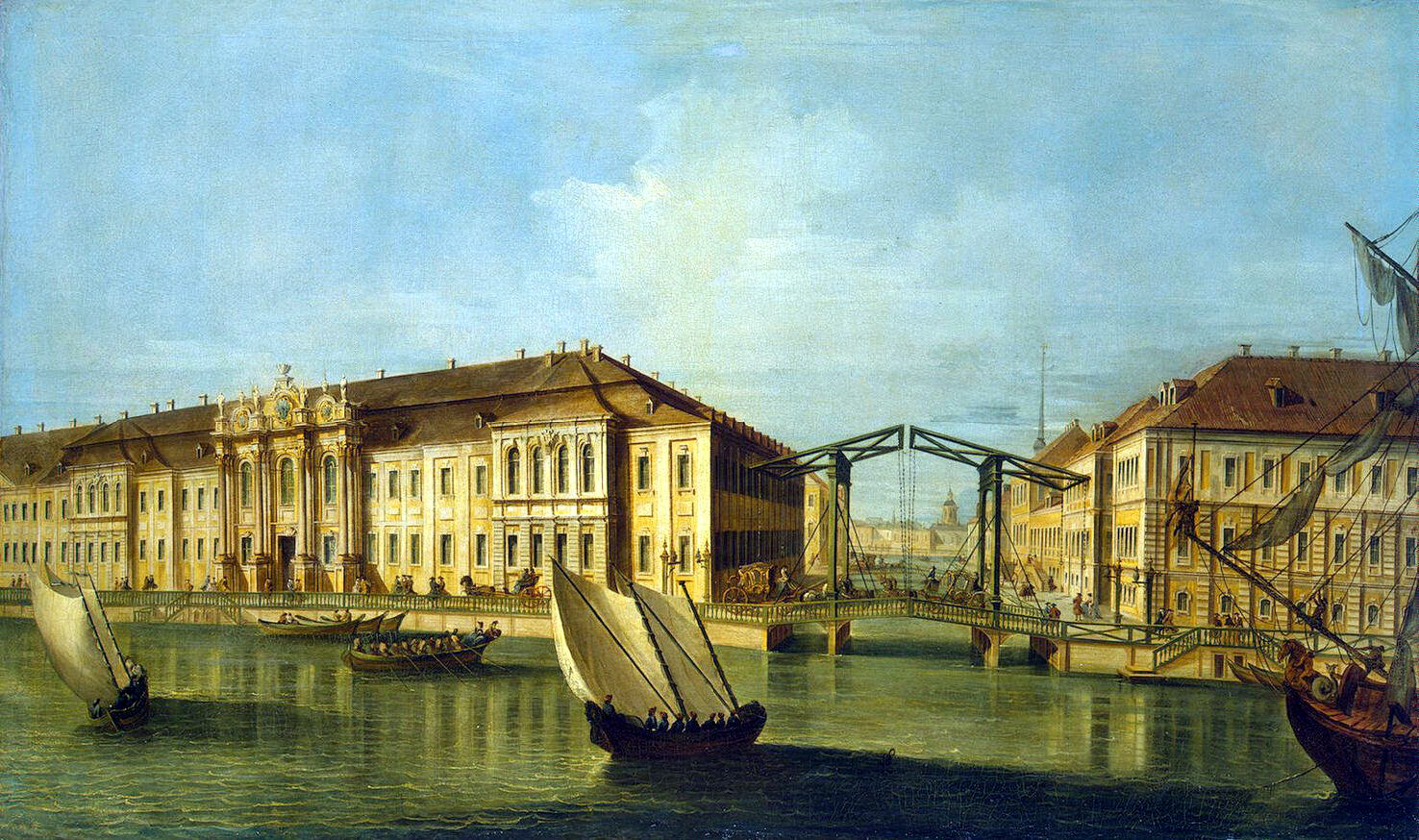
The "third Winter Palace," built from a project of Mattarnovi in 1719-1721

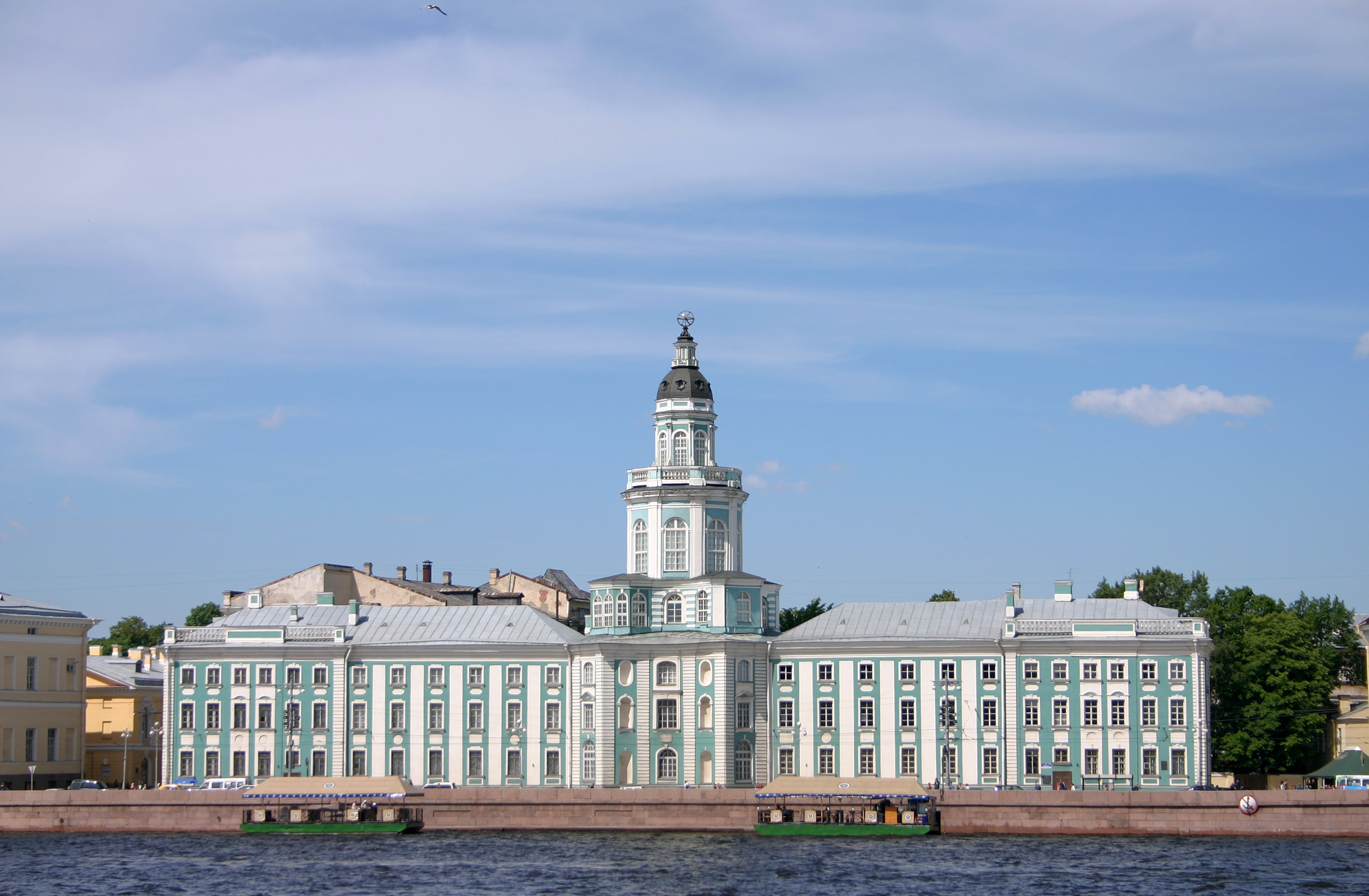
The Kunstkammer is the only surviving Mattarnovi building

Georg Johann Mattarnovi (Russian: Георг Иванович Маттарнови, romanized: Georg Ivanovich Mattarnovi; died 2 November 1719) was a German Baroque architect and sculptor, notable for his work in Saint Petersburg.

== Early life ==
The birthplace of Mattarnovi is unknown, but most probably it was Prussia. His year of birth is also unknown. He was a sculptor, and a disciple and assistant of German architect Andreas Schlüter. Mattarnovi arrived in Saint Petersburg in 1714, following Schlüter. After the death of Schlüter, Mattarnovi continued work on Schlüter's projects.

== Career ==
In 1715–1719, Mattarnovi managed the construction of the grotto pavilion in the Summer Garden originally designed by Schlüter. He also built two pavilions there, and a colonnade-gallery for an ancient sculpture of Venus. Mattarnovi built Tsar Peter I's main residence in Saint Peterburg, the so-called "new Winter Palace", or the "third Winter Palace". Originally, as designed by Schlüter, it was a small two-storey house, but in 1719–1721, the building was significantly expanded. The building was the centre of the ensemble of buildings on the Palace Embankment. The Great Hall of the Winter Palace was the site of the public mourning ceremony for Peter I. Mattarnovi's Winter Palace was later torn down, and Giacomo Quarenghi built the Hermitage Theater on the site. In 1718–1719, Mattarnovi built a mansion for the procurator-general of the Senate, P. I. Yaguzhinsky, on the Palace Embankment.

Mattarnovi built Mytny (Gostinny) Dvor on the intersection of Nevsky Prospect and Moyka River (1716–1720). The building was destroyed by fire in 1736 and a new Gostiny Dvor was built on a different spot. Mattarnovi was the originator of the "standard houses" built on Petrogradsky Island and the first version of Saint Isaac's Cathedral, built from 1717—1723.

The only surviving building of a Mattarnovi project is the Kunstkamera, the first museum in Russia, built from 1718–1734.

Mattarnovi died on 2 November 1719 in Saint Petersburg, Russia, where he had worked for five years. His son, Philipp Georg Mattarnovi (1716–1742), was a noted engraver.
