= Oranienbaum, Russia =

Russian royal palace near St. Petersburg

Historical Centre of the Town of Lomonosov (Oranienbaum), including the Palace and Park Ensemble of the Upper Park and Lower Garden
UNESCO World Heritage Site
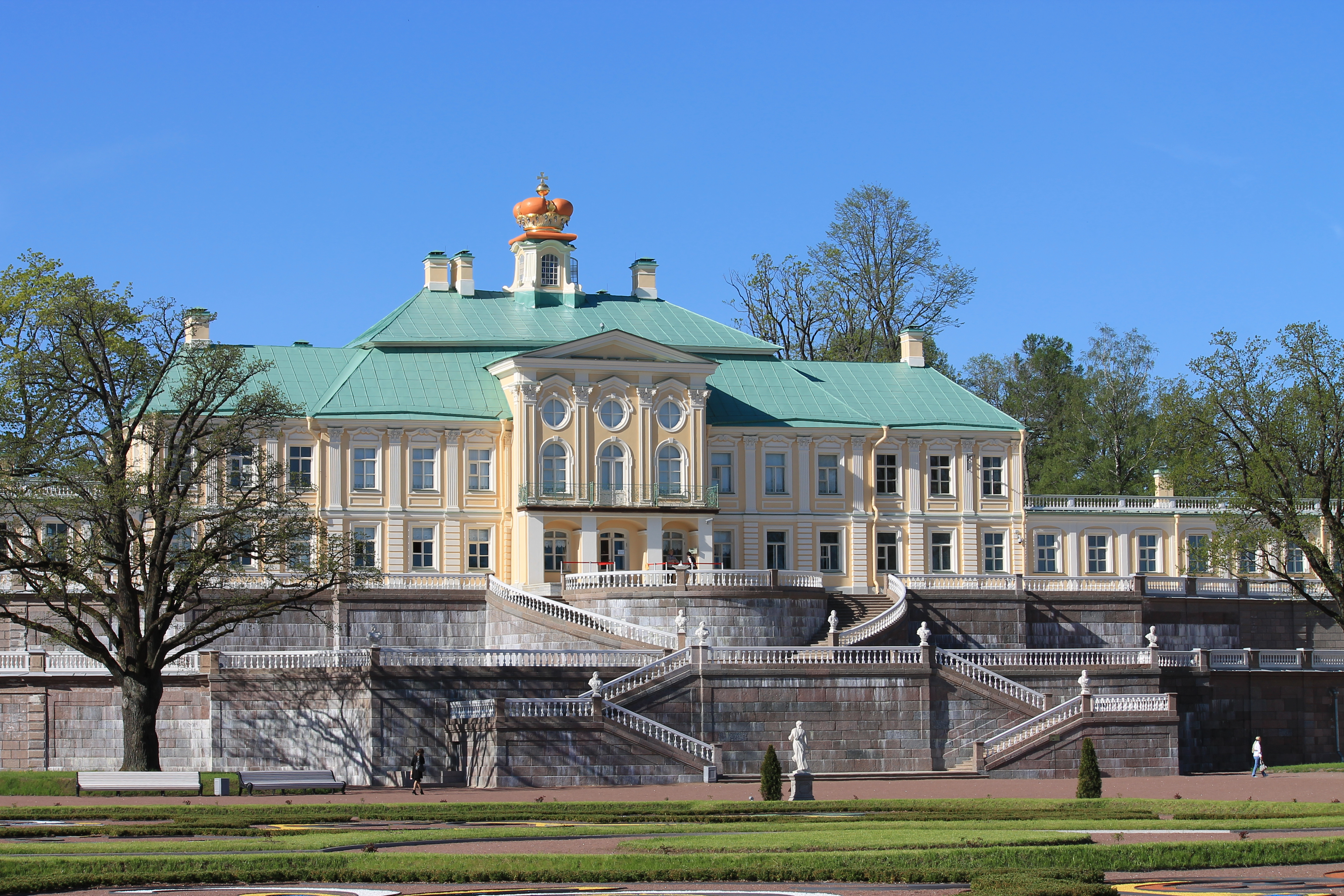

- Location within Europe Location within Russia
- Location: Lomonosov, Saint Petersburg, Russia
- Part of: Historic Centre of Saint Petersburg and Related Groups of Monuments
- Criteria: Cultural: (i), (ii), (iv), (vi)
- Reference: 540bis-020a
- Inscription: 1990 (14th Session)
- Extensions: 2013
- Area: 757 ha (2.92 sq mi)
- Coordinates: 59°54′54″N 29°45′14″E

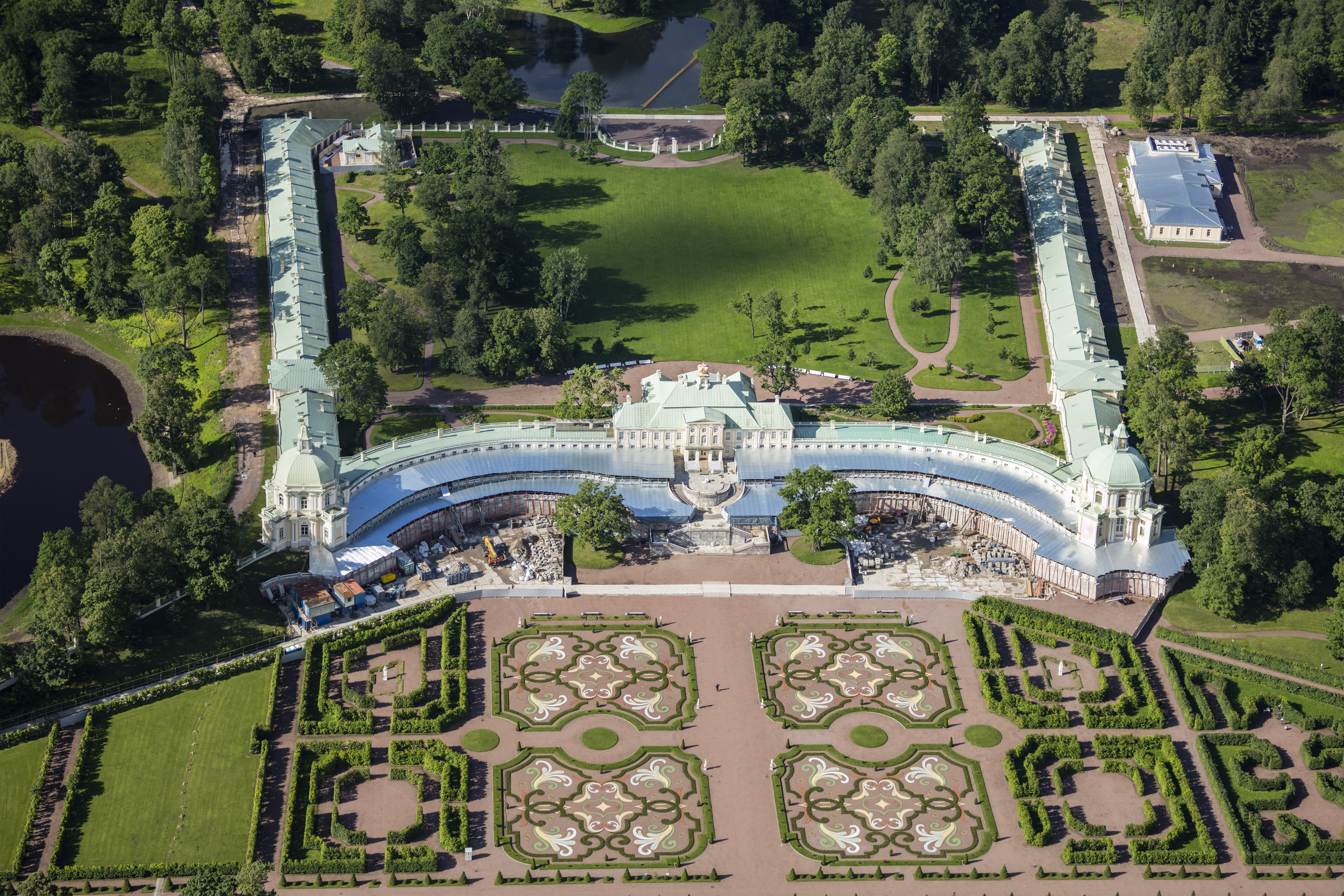
Aerial view of the Grand Menshikov Palace

Oranienbaum (Russian: Ораниенба́ум) is a Russian royal residence, located on the Gulf of Finland west of St. Petersburg. The Palace ensemble and the city centre are UNESCO World Heritage Sites.

== History ==
In 1707, four years after Peter the Great founded Saint Petersburg, he gave the grounds near the seaside to his right-hand man, Aleksandr Danilovich Menshikov.

Menshikov commissioned the architects Giovanni Maria Fontana and Gottfried Johann Schädel, who built his residence, the Grand Menshikov Palace from 1710 to 1727 (not to be confused with Menshikov Palace in Saint Petersburg, built by the same architects around the same time). Menshikov was deposed shortly after Peter's death, and died in exile, and the palace passed out of his family. In 1743, Oranienbaum became the summer residence of Grand Duke Pyotr Fyodorovich, the heir of Empress Elizabeth (the future Emperor Peter III). From 1756 to 1762, the architect Antonio Rinaldi built the Peterstadt Fortress ensemble on the bank of the Karost River for Grand Duke Peter Fedorovitch.

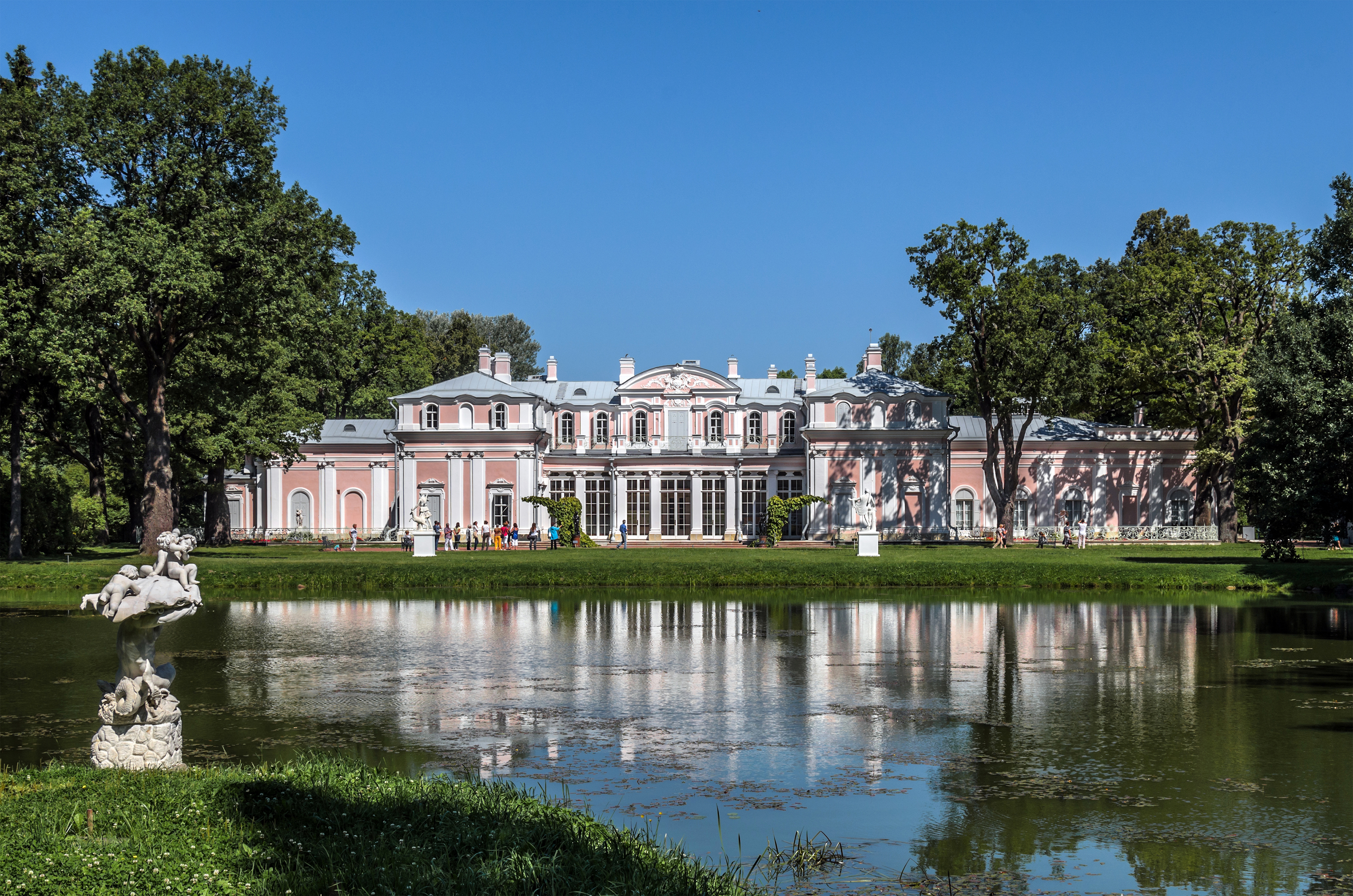
Chinese Palace in Oranienbaum

From the outside, the palace is a relatively simple building, single-storey except for the small central pavilion, painted in a mellow combination of ochre and yellow. The Upper Park was laid out from 1750 to 1770.

The palace was the site of two opera premieres to libretti by Metastasio in the middle of the eighteenth century, Amor prigioniero (one act, composed by Francesco Araia, 1755), and Semiramide riconosciuta (three acts, composed by Vincenzo Manfredini, 1760).

In the 19th century, Oranienbaum became a noble manor. During World War II, Oranienbaum suffered to a much lesser extent than other suburbs of St. Petersburg, since defense was deployed here on the so-called "Oranienbaum Bridgehead". However, the ensemble became desolate in the post-war period, and its serious restoration began only in the late 1990s. Restoration Of Oranienbaum has been a slow process. For the city which grew up around the palace see Lomonosov, Russia.

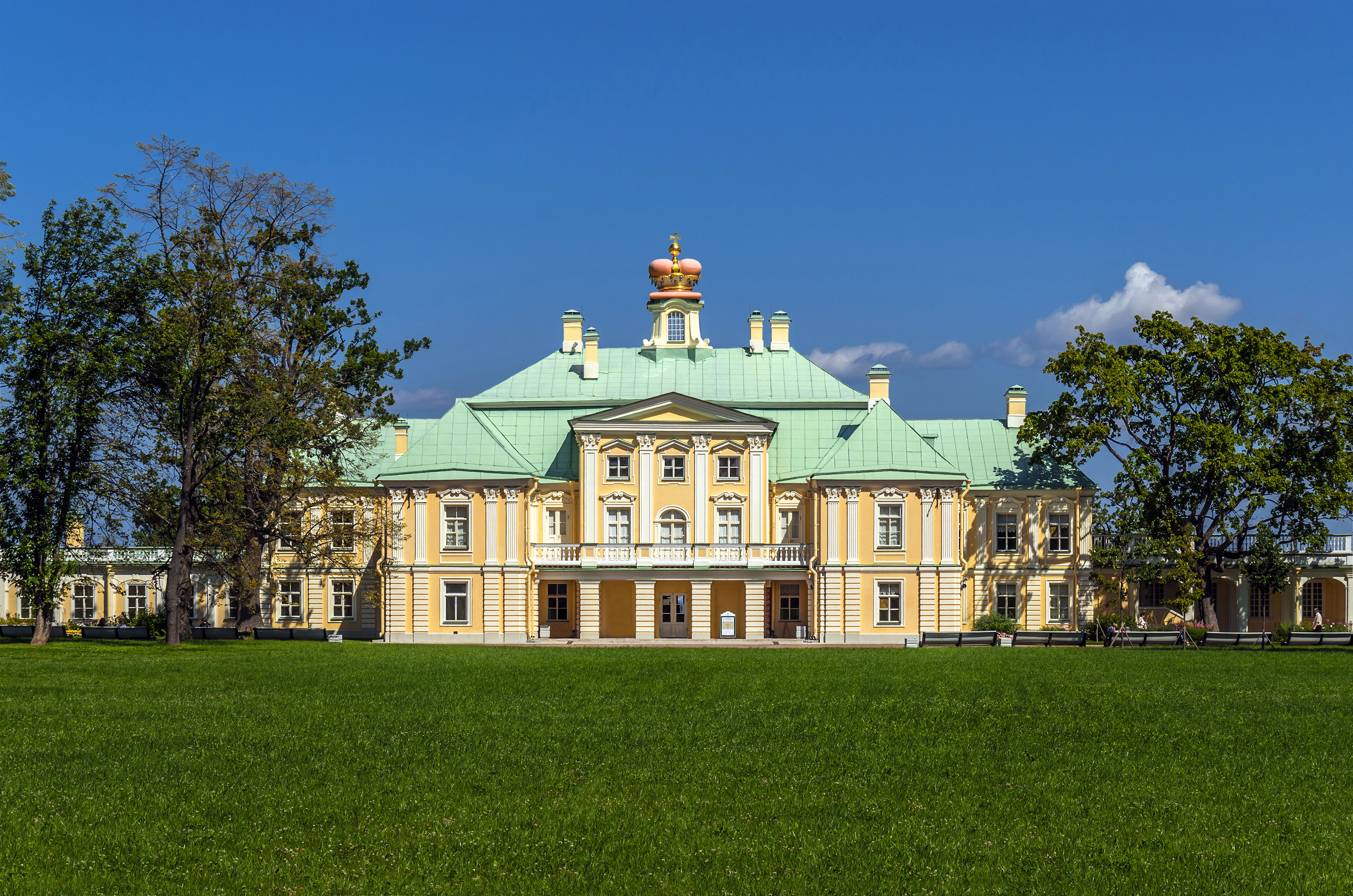
Grand Menshikov Palace south

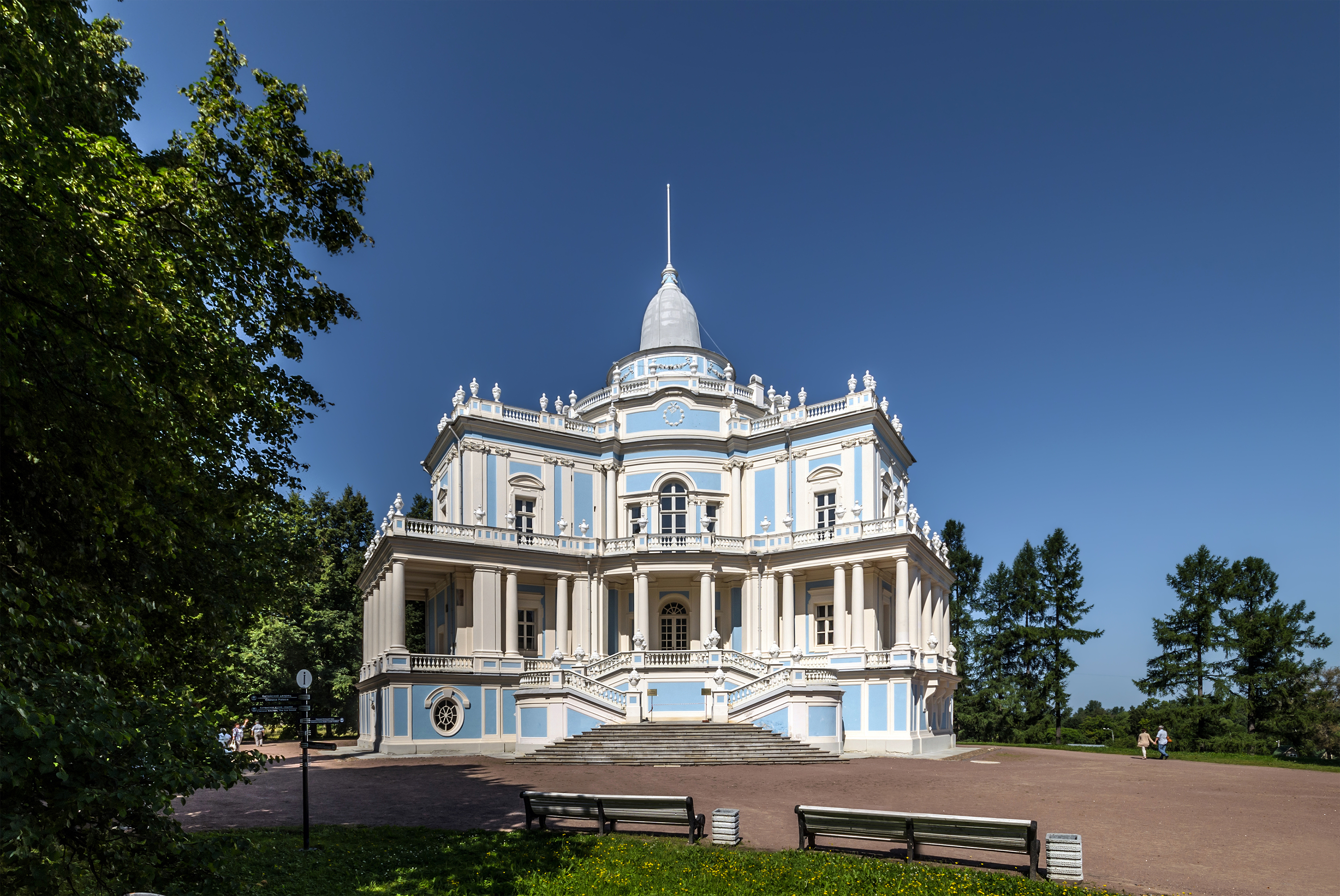
Katalnaya Gorka pavilion, a part of the 18th-century "Russian mountains" roller coaster complex

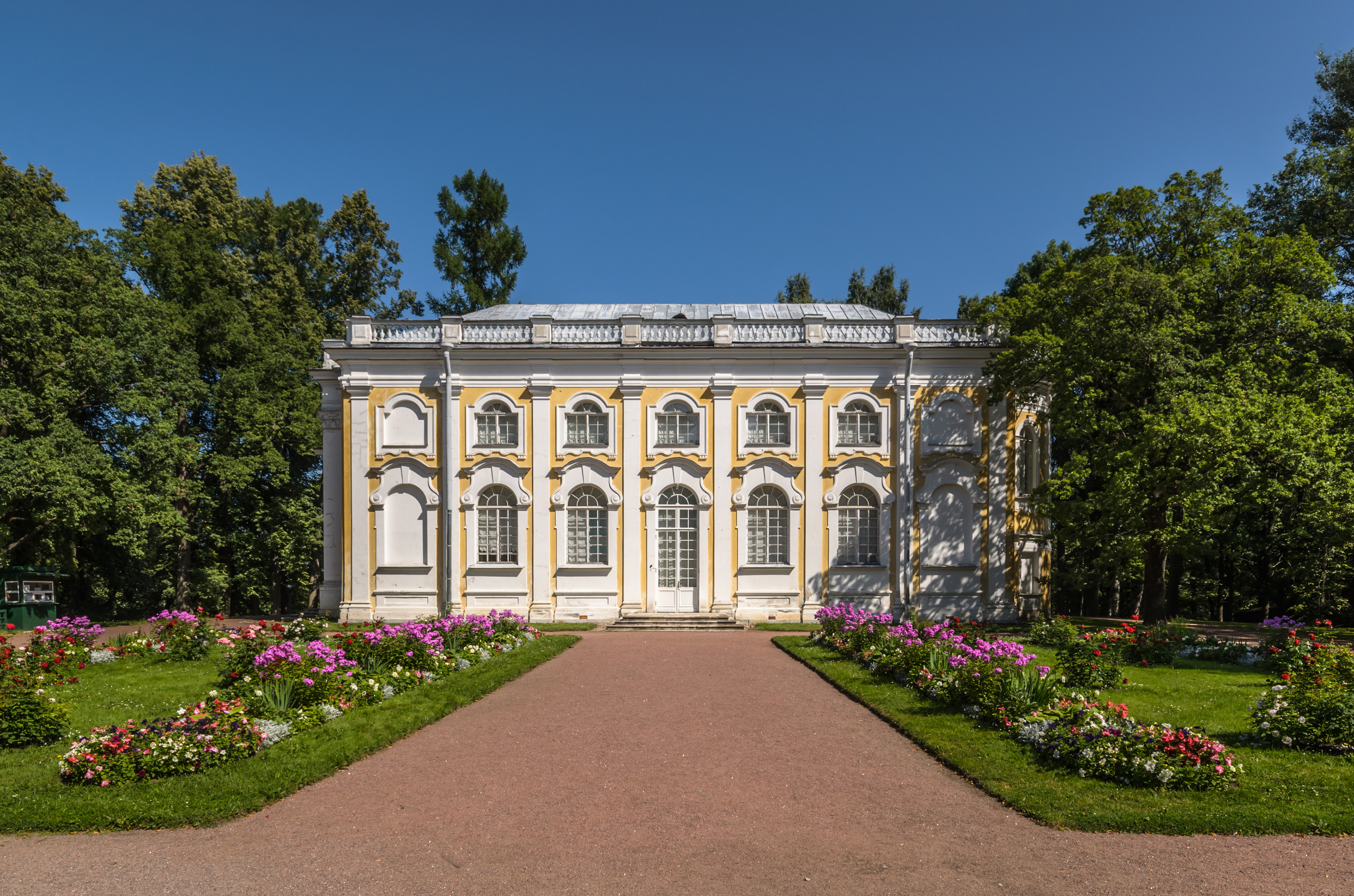
Kammenoe zalo pavilion

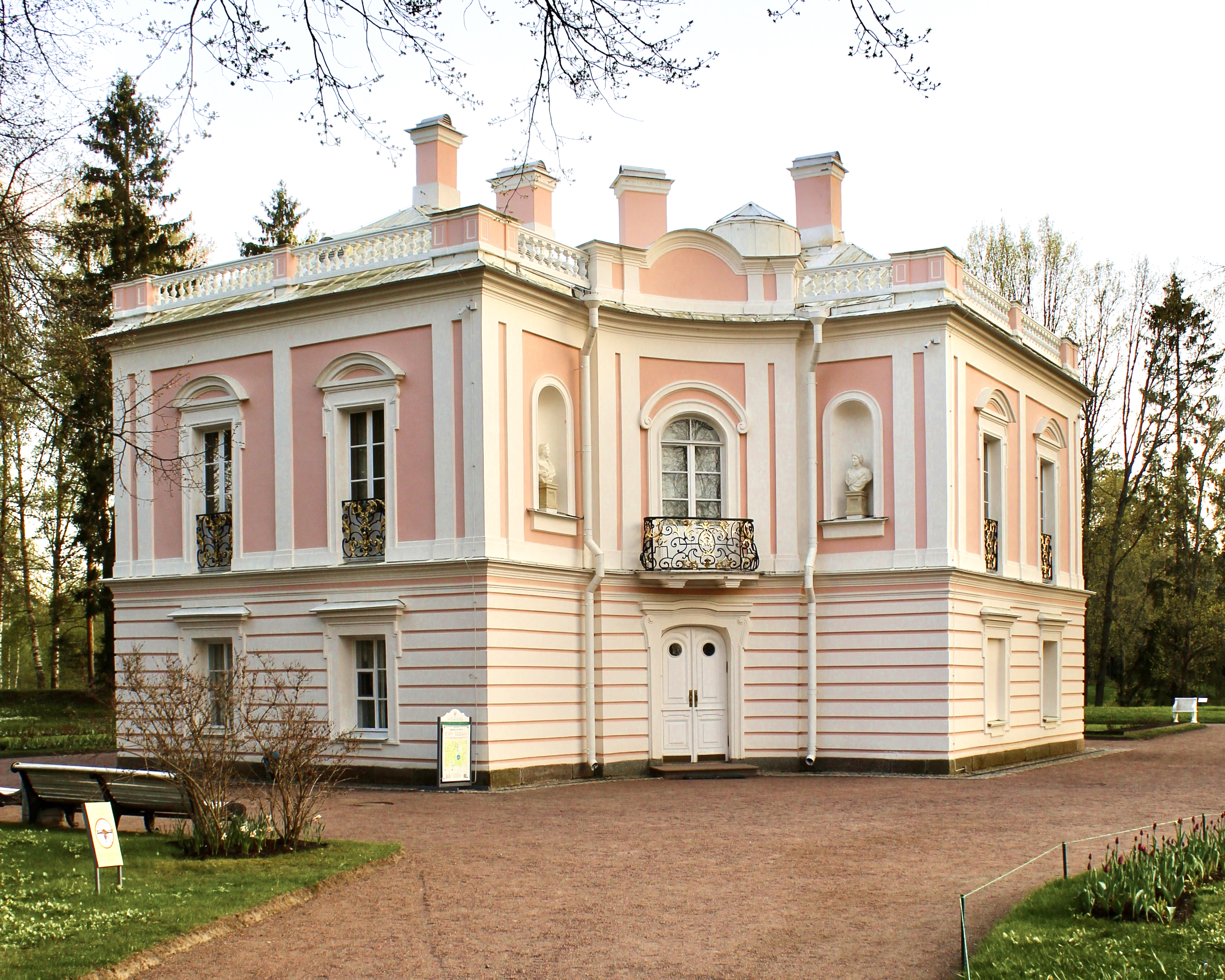
Peter III Palace

== Sculptures of Oranienbaum ==
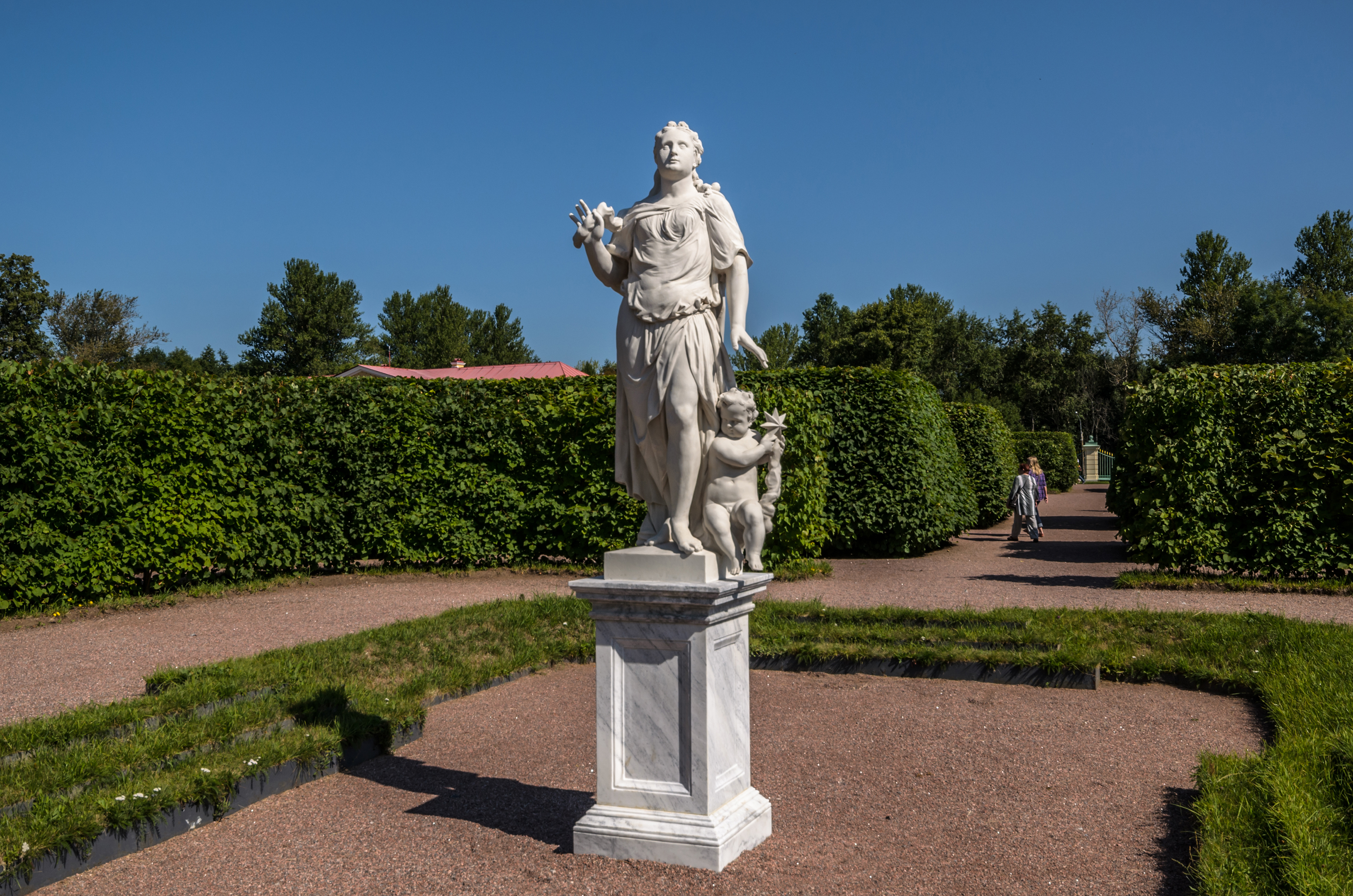
Air

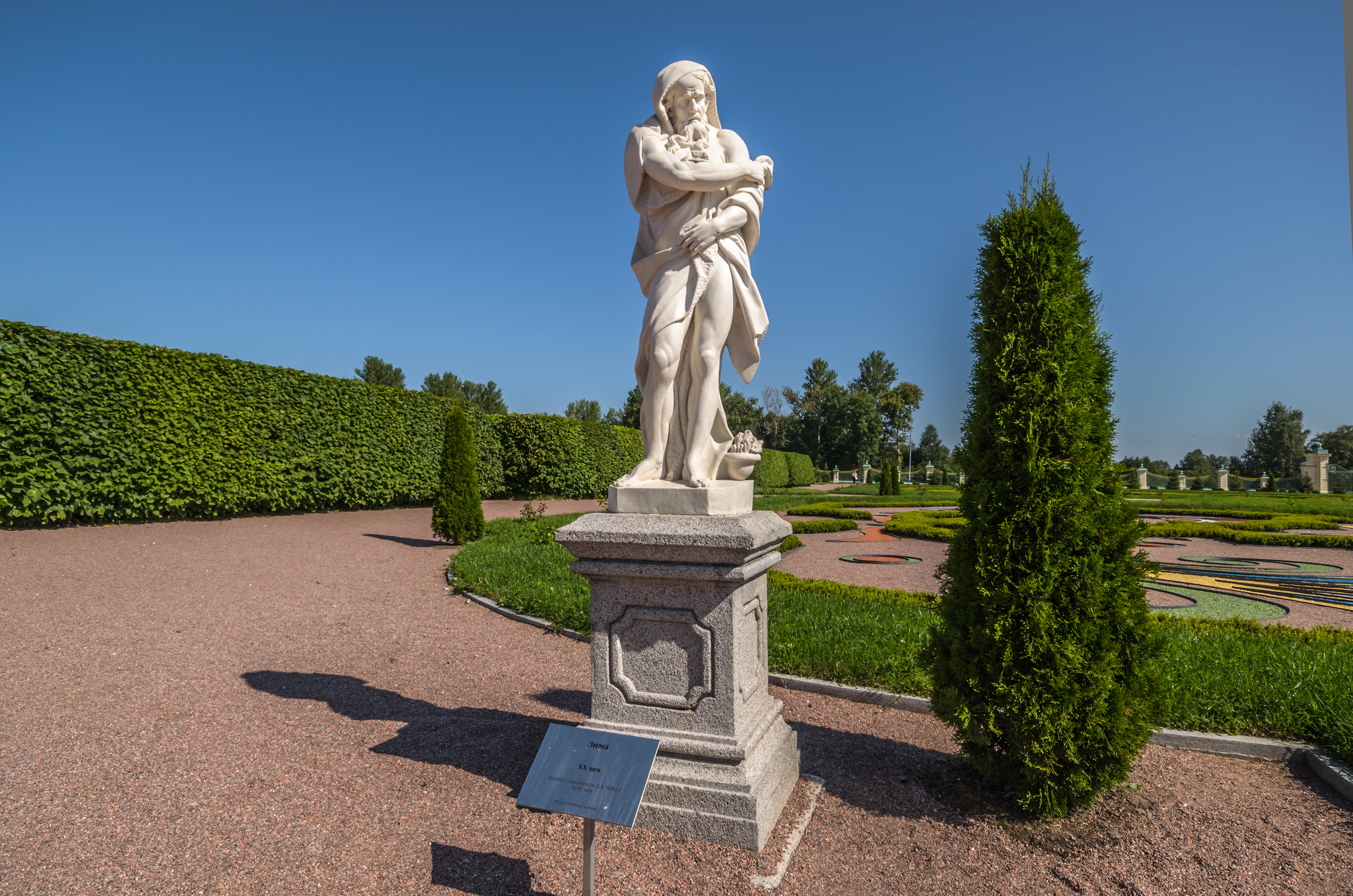
Winter

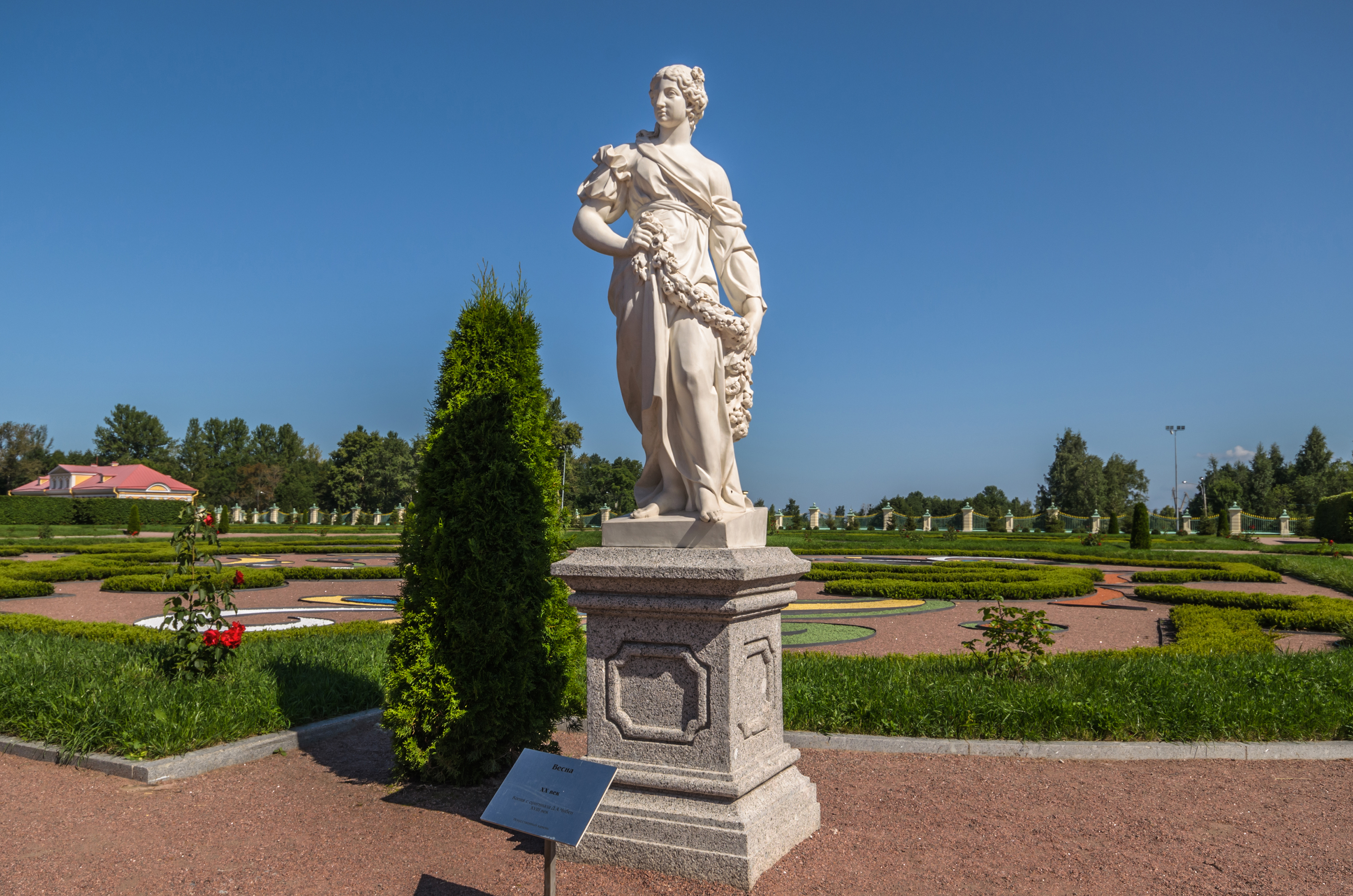
Spring

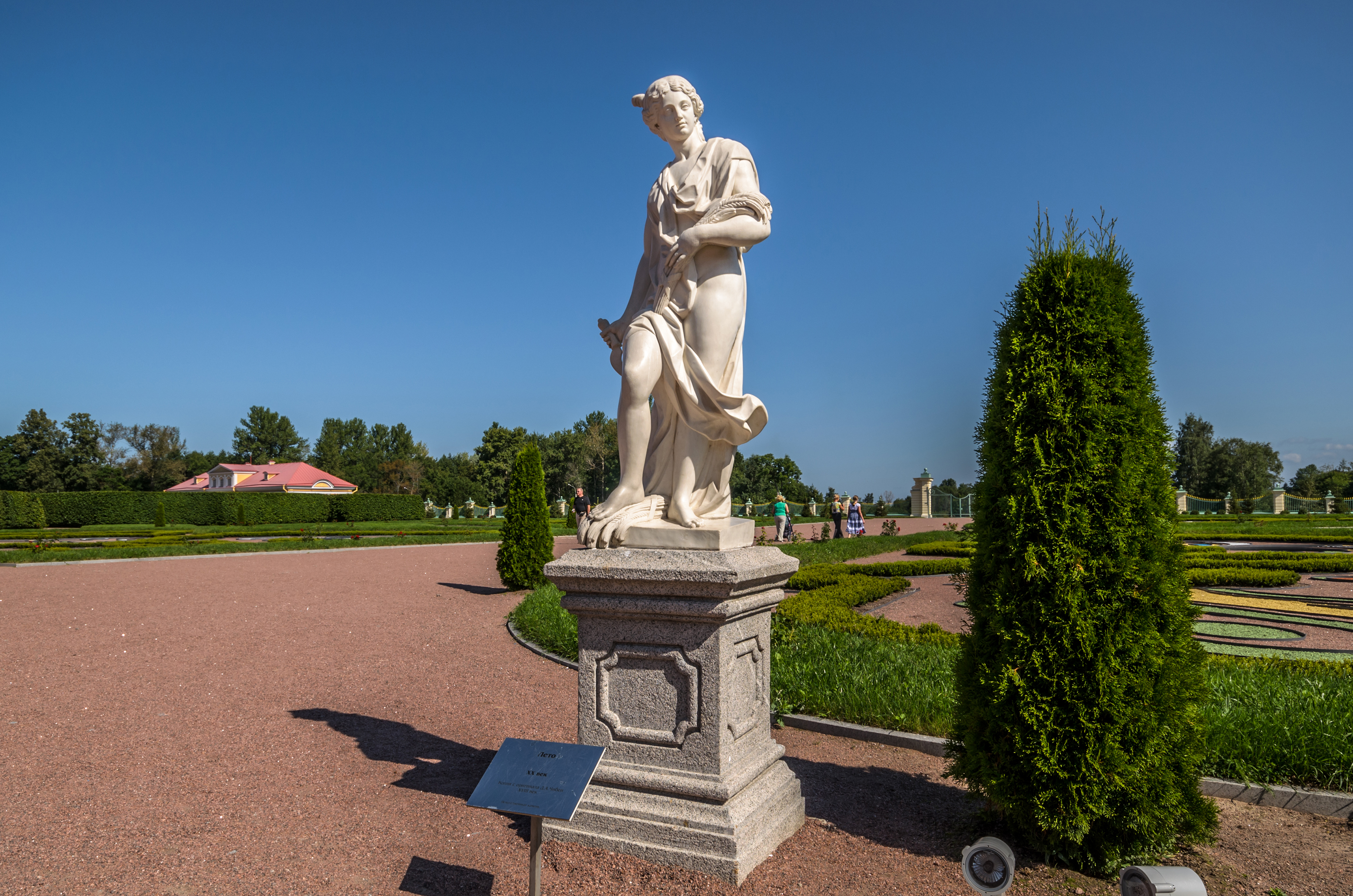
Summer

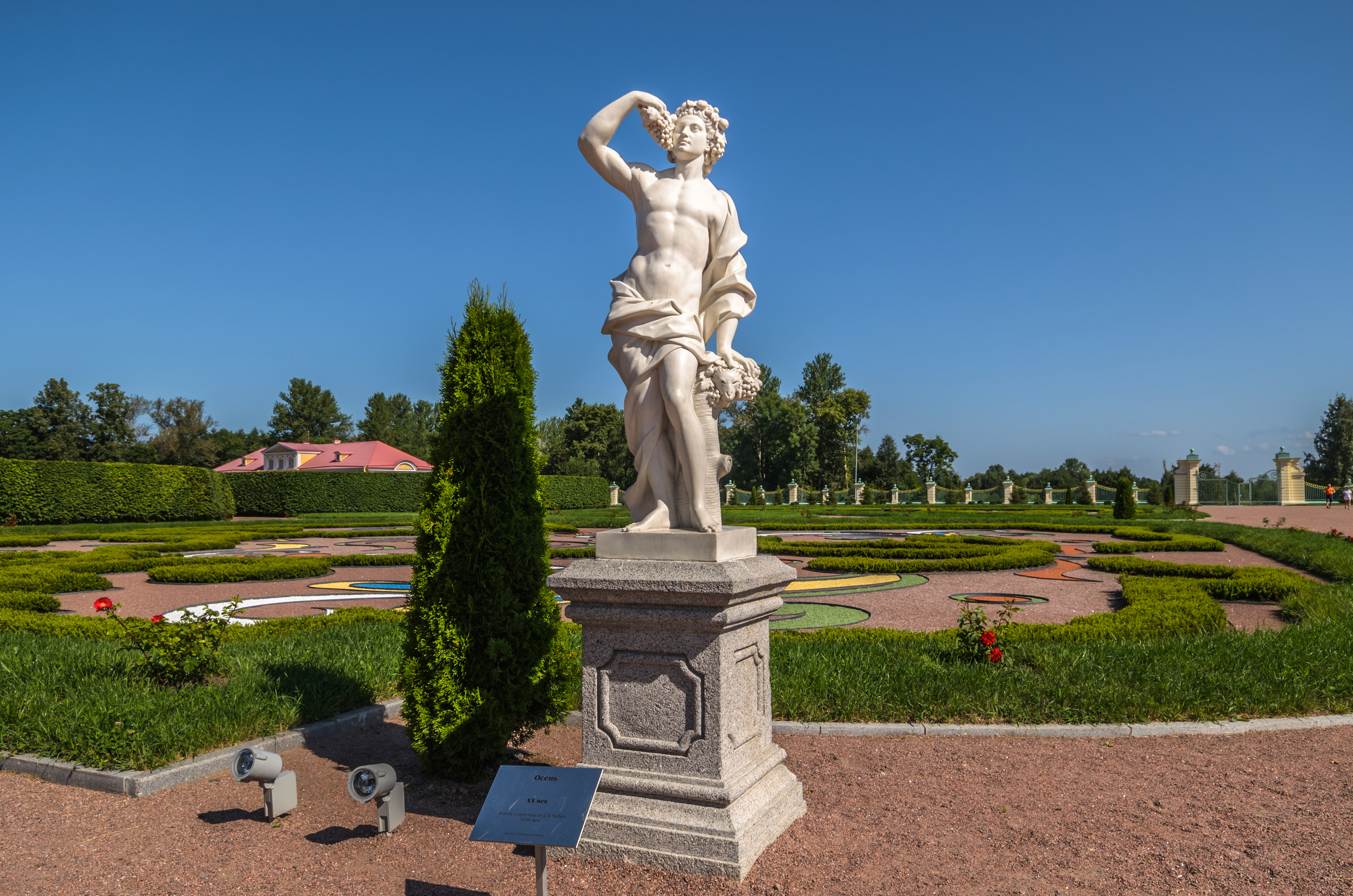
Autumn

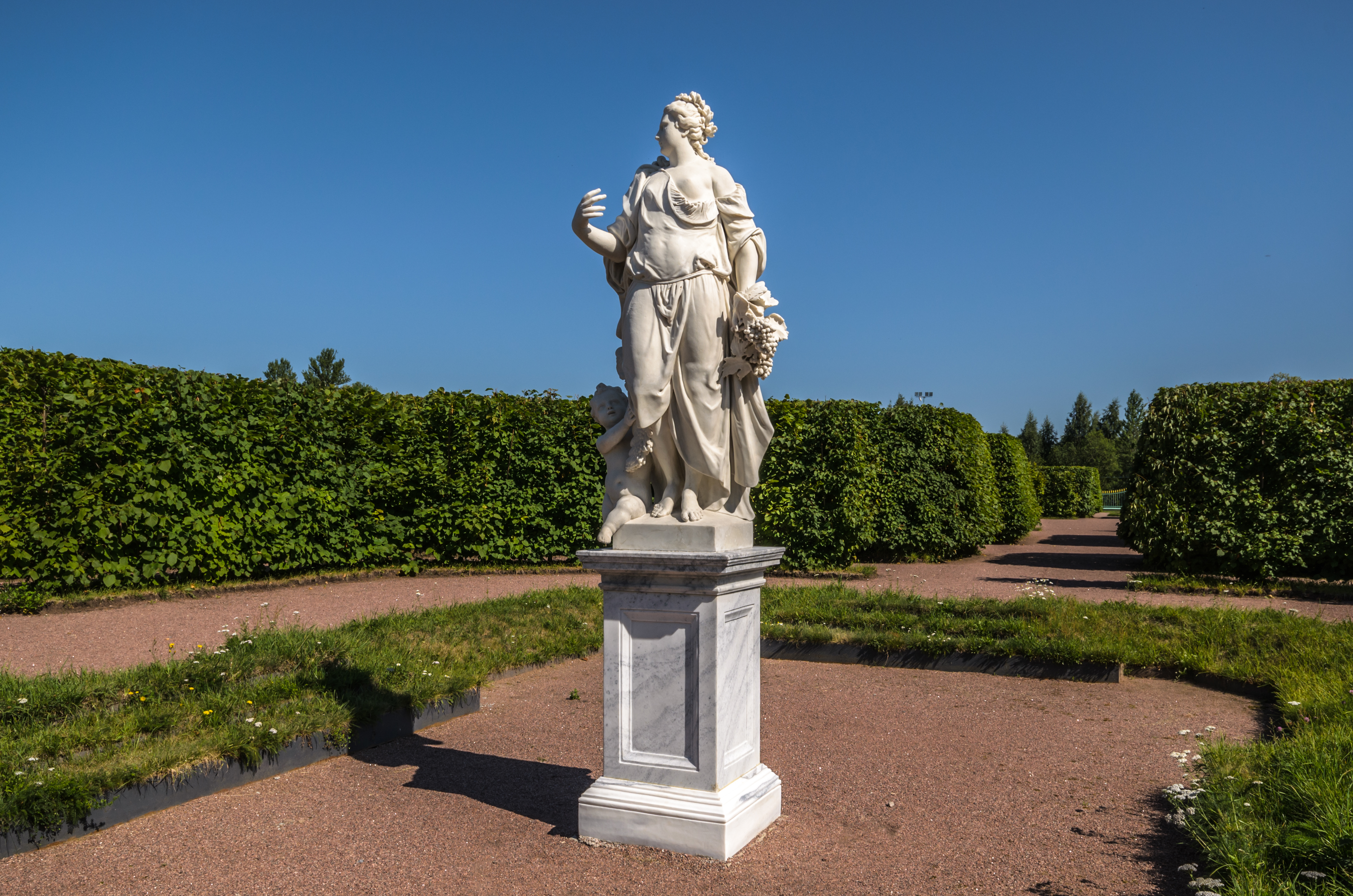
Land

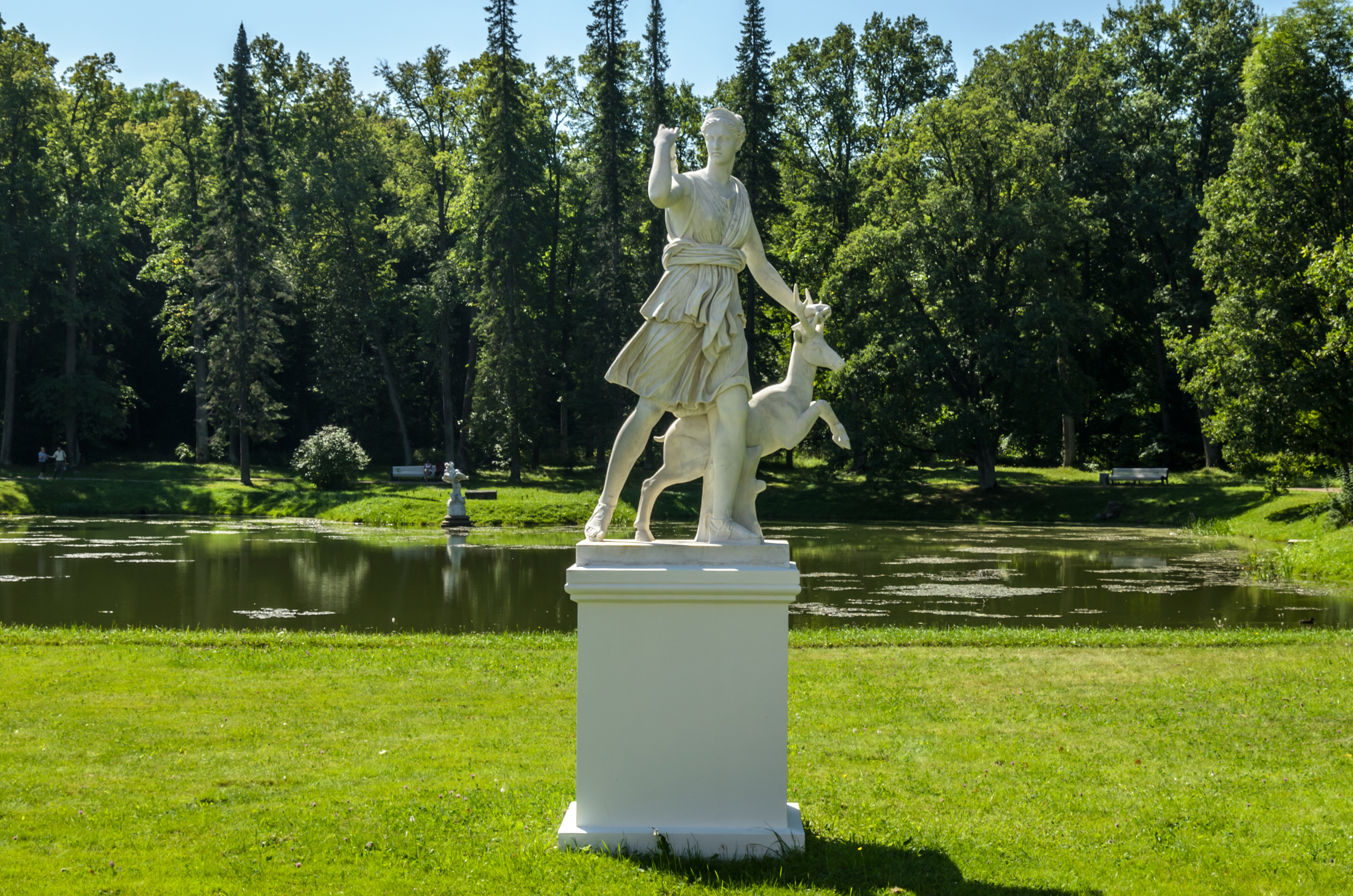
Diana of Versailles

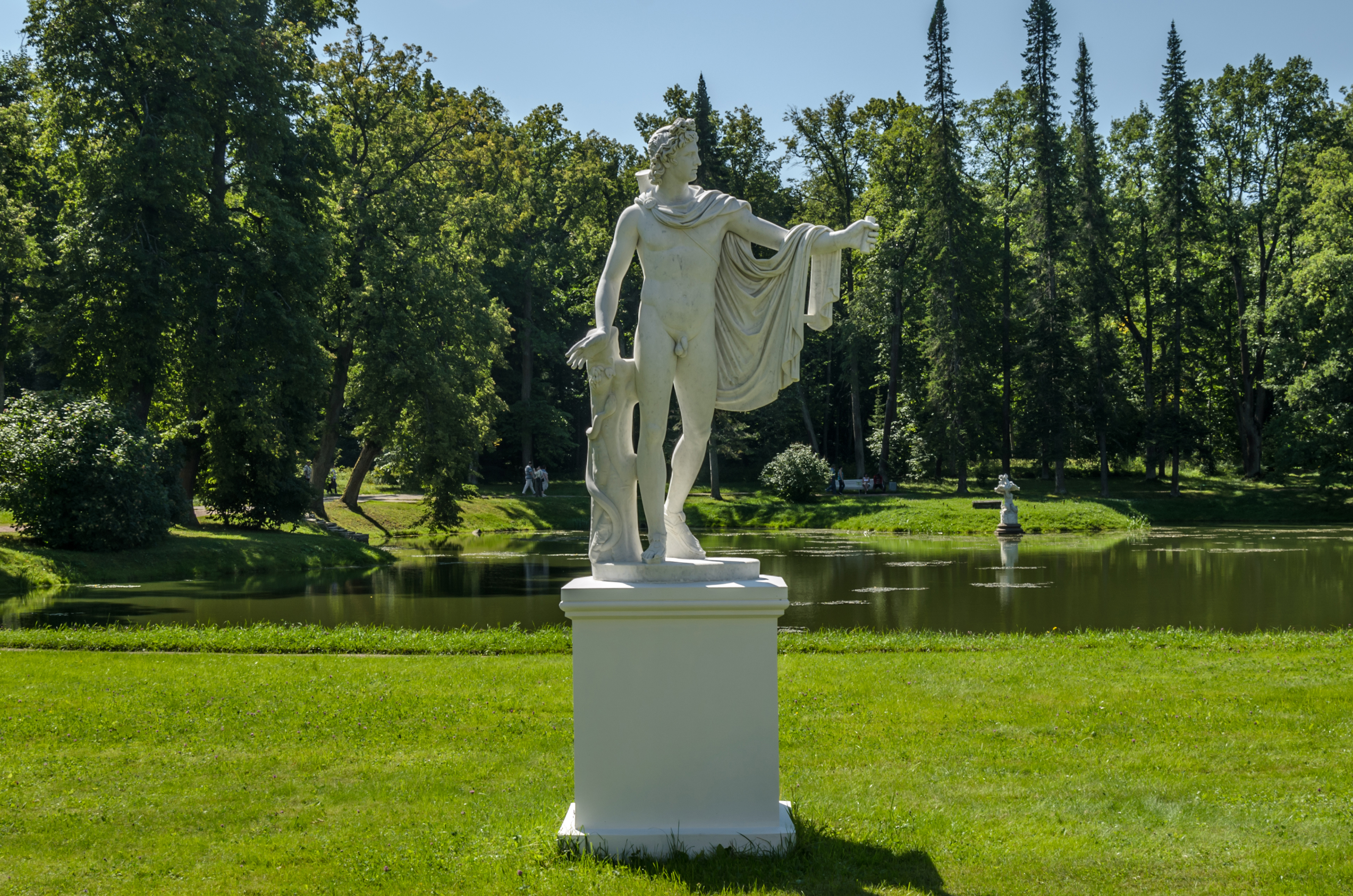
Apollo Belvedere

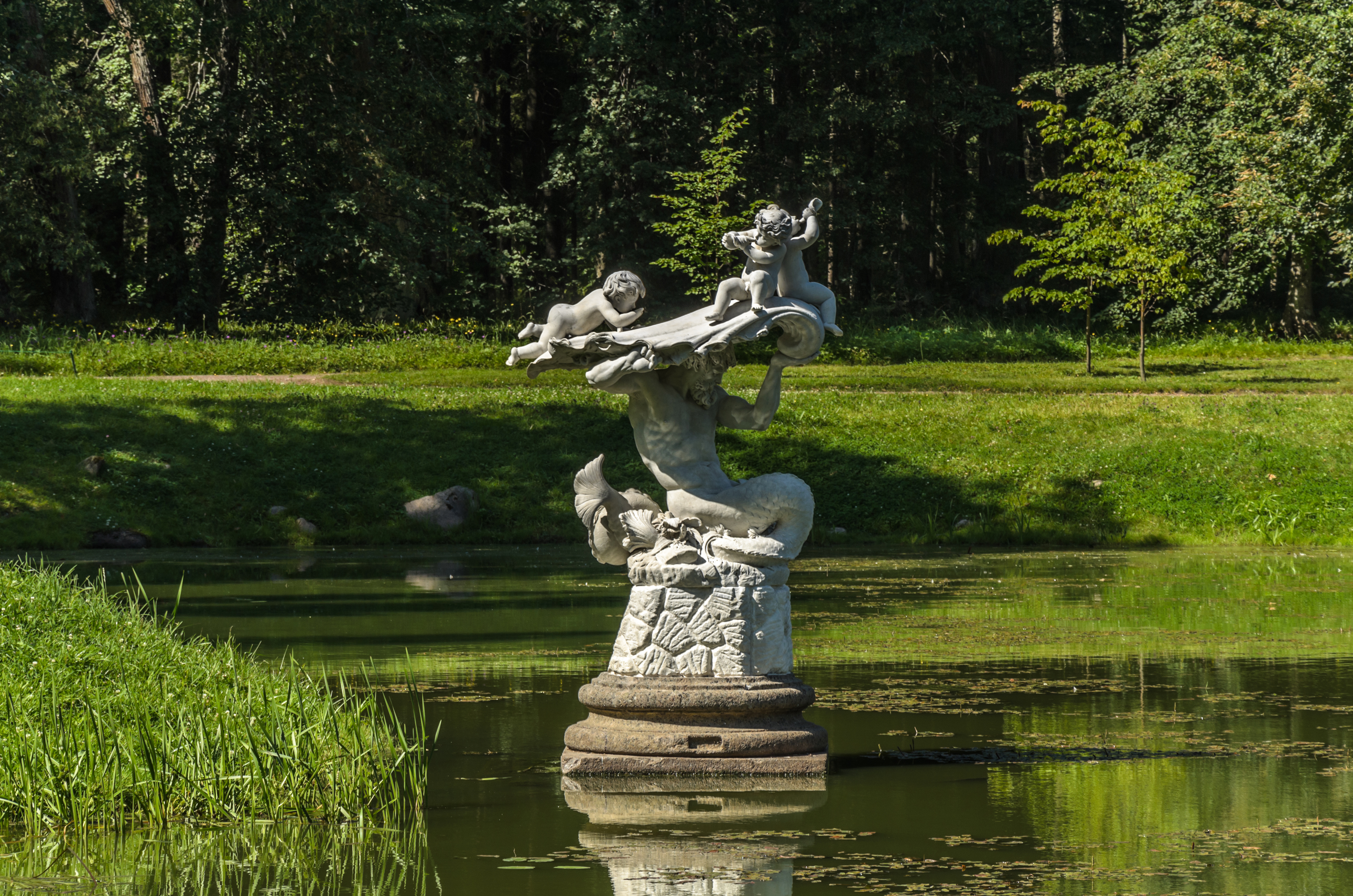
Triton Saving Children

== See also ==
- List of Baroque residences
- Lomonosov, Russia
