= Universitetskaya Embankment =

Embankment in Saint Petersburg, Russia

Coordinates: 59.9392°N 30.2984°E

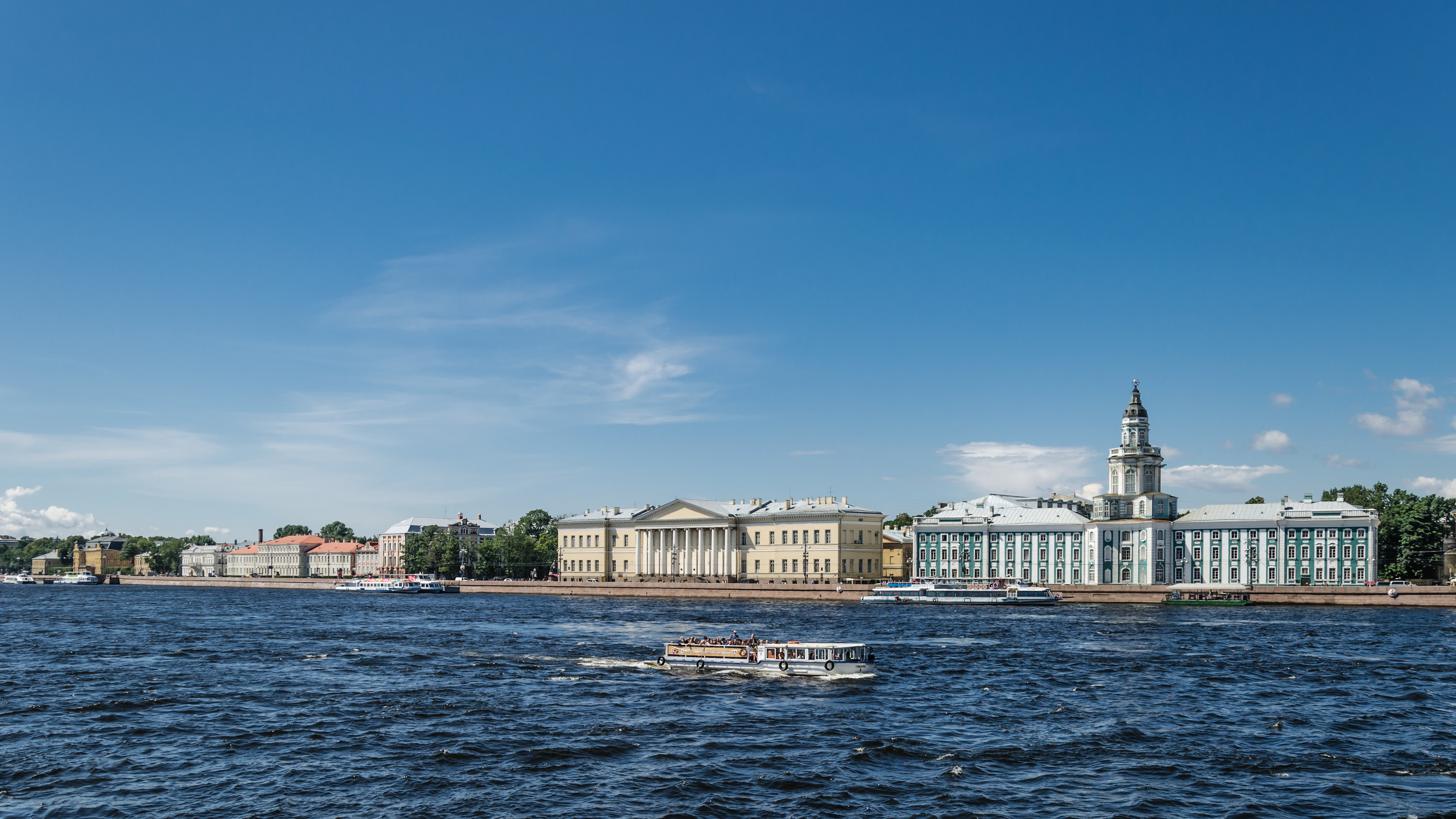
Universitetskaya Embankment

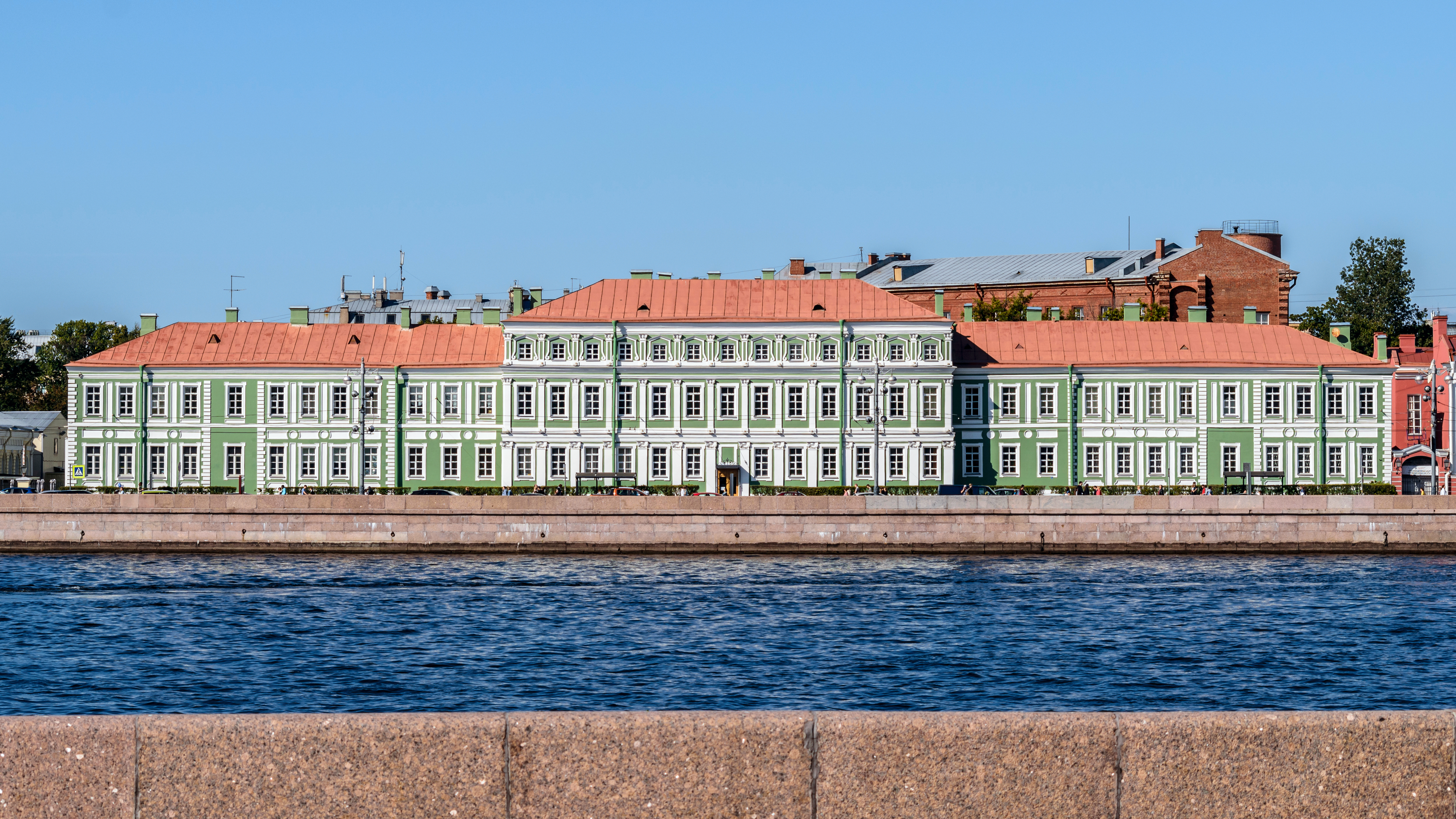
Saint Petersburg State University

Universitetskaya Embankment (Russian: Университетская набережная) is a 1.2 km long embankment on the right bank of the Bolshaya Neva, on Vasilievsky Island in Saint Petersburg, Russia. Starting at the Spit of Vasilievsky Island, it spans between Palace Bridge and Blagoveshchensky Bridge.

The bank was lined with granite in 1805–1810 (eastern part), 1831–1834 (western part) and the 1850s (near Blagoveshchensky Bridge), respectively. It features an ensemble of Petrine Baroque buildings of the early 18th century, including the Kunstkamera, Twelve Collegia, Menshikov Palace, as well as the neoclassical building of the Academy of Arts.

The embankment was formerly connected to the left bank through Isaakiyevsky Pontone Bridge, constructed in 1819–1841 in front of Senate Square.

One of the campuses of Saint Petersburg State University (hosted in the Twelve Collegia and several other buildings), Saint Petersburg branch of the Russian Academy of Sciences, Peter the Great Museum of Anthropology and Ethnography (hosted in the Kunstkamera) and Zoological Museum are all situated along the embankment.

The embankment was named after the university in 1887.

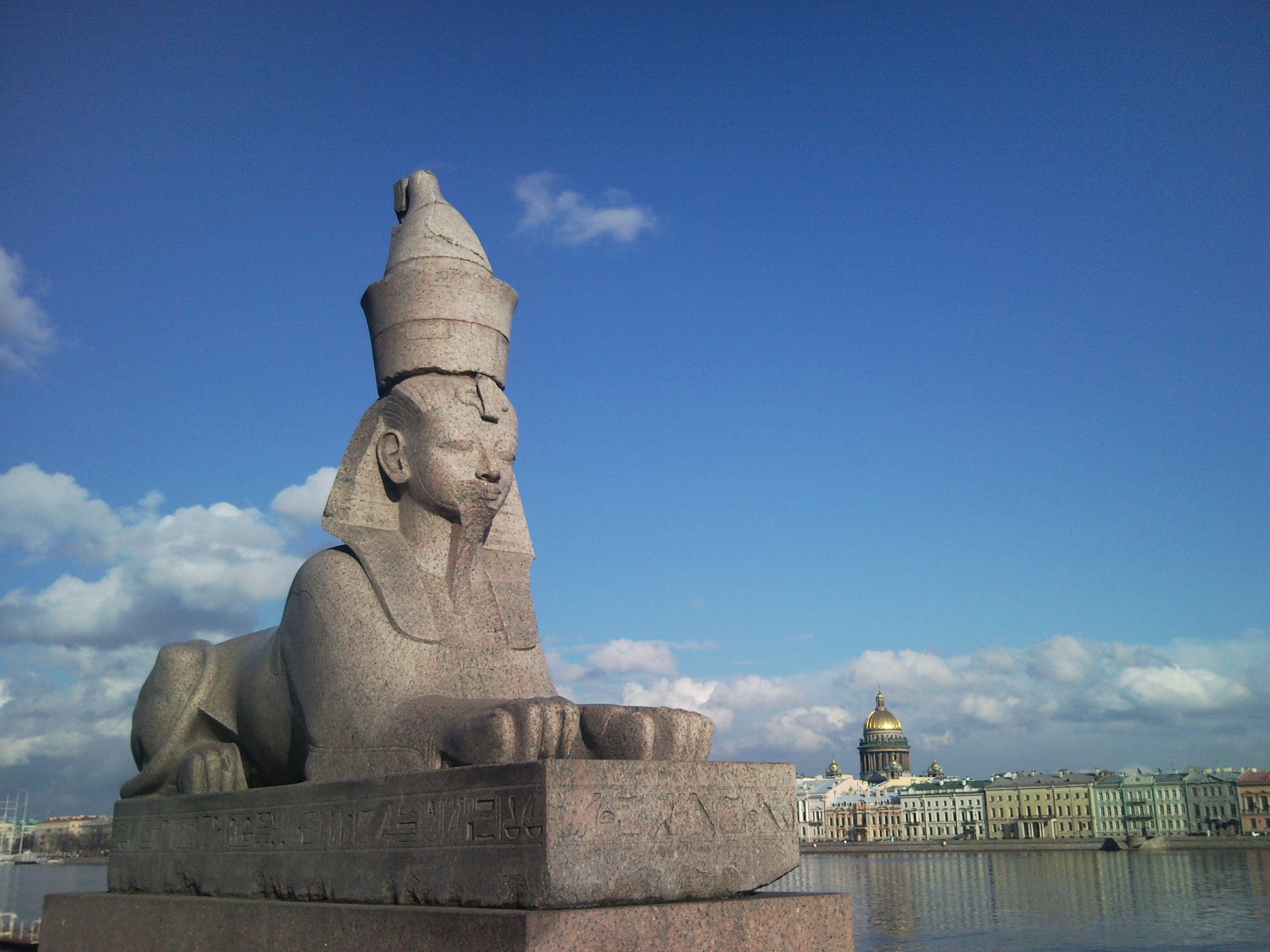
One of the two ancient sphinxes on the embankment

== Sphinxes ==
A quay in front of the Imperial Academy of Arts building, adorned with two authentic sphinxes of Pharaoh Amenhotep III brought in 1832 from Thebes, Egypt, was designed by Konstantin Thon and built in 1832–1834.
