= Giovanni Maria Fontana =

Italian-Swiss architect

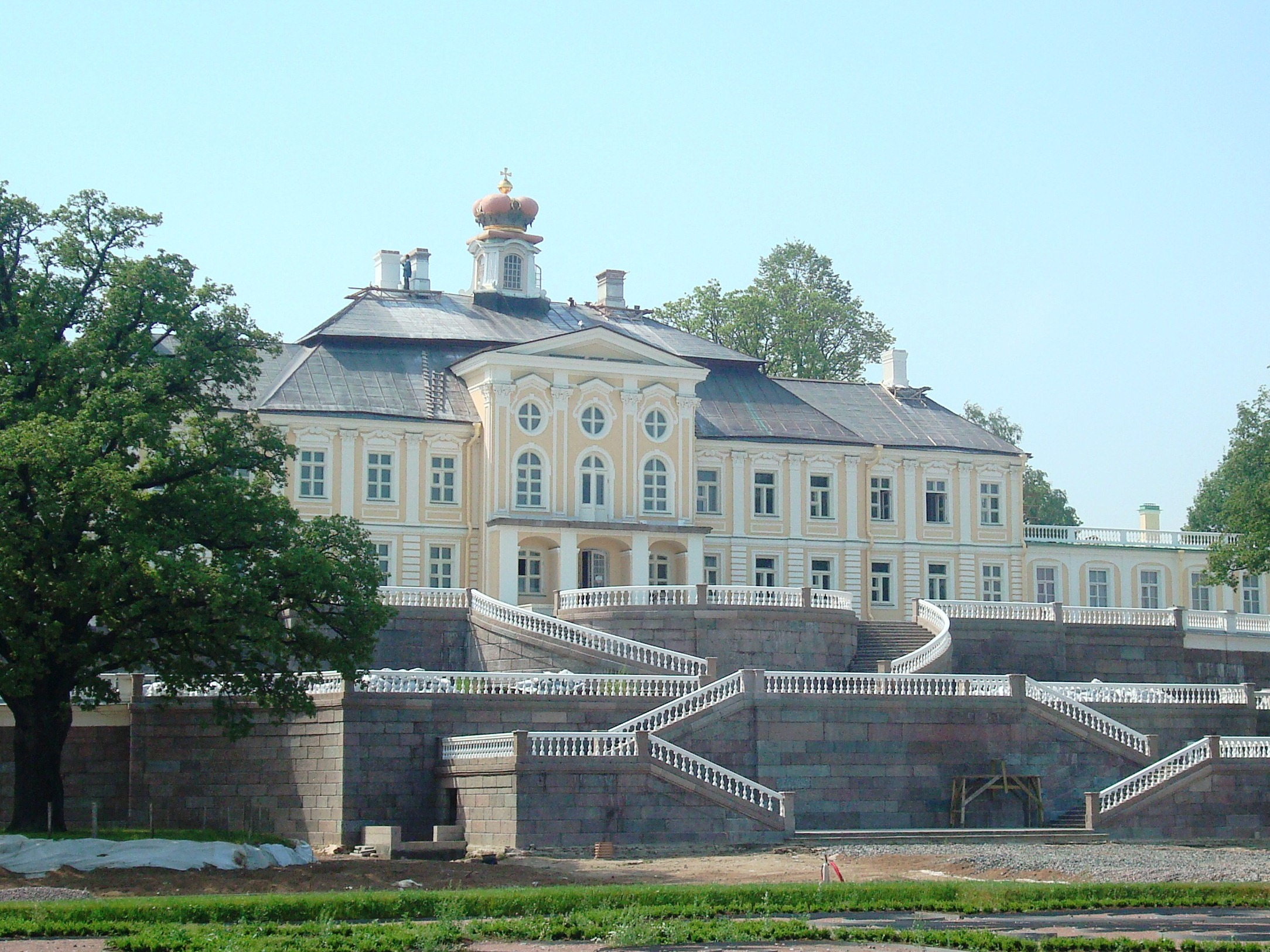
- Oranienbaum, Russia
- Born: c. 1670; Lugano, Ticino
- Died: after 1712
- Known for: Architecture
- Notable work: Oranienbaum, Russia; Menshikov Palace
- Movement: Baroque

Giovanni Maria Fontana (c. 1670 – after 1712) was an Italian-Swiss architect, born in Lugano, who worked in Russia. Fontana's most prominent commissions were those from Prince Menshikov, to build his various palaces, notably Oranienbaum. He often worked in tandem with Gottfried Johann Schädel.

== Biography ==
Very little is known about Giovanni Maria Fontana's life. Alleged to be a relative of the famous Roman architect Carlo Fontana, he hailed from a family originating in Ticino. His exact date of birth is unknown. The earliest written records of his presence in Russia date to 1703. Following the signing of an agreement with the Russian ambassador, Andreï Ismaïlov, in Copenhagen, Fontana arrived in Russia via Arkhangelsk. According to Igor Grabar, Fontana may have been involved in constructing and altering various gates in Moscow from 1703 onwards. His first project was the Lefortovo Palace in the Nemetskaya Sloboda (the German Quarter).

After spending a few years in Moscow, he was granted the title of 'architect' (previously, he had been designated a master of palace construction and fortifications). In January 1709, by order of Tsar Peter the Great, Fontana translated Giacomo Barozzi da Vignola's The Five Orders of Architecture into Russian. The text was circulated to serve as a practical manual for the Russian students and collaborators working alongside Western and Italian architects (such as Fontana himself and Domenico Trezzini) who were engaged in the construction of Saint Petersburg. Archival records indicate that Fontana moved to Saint Petersburg around 1710, around the same time as Alexander Danilovich Menshikov. In collaboration with Gottfried Johann Schädel, Fontana designed and built both the Menshikov Palace on Vasilyevsky Island and the Grand Menshikov Palace in Oranienbaum (Lomonosov) under the commission of Prince Menshikov. Fontana left Russia in either 1712 or 1714, after which nothing more is known about him.

== Works ==
=== Lefortovo Palace ===
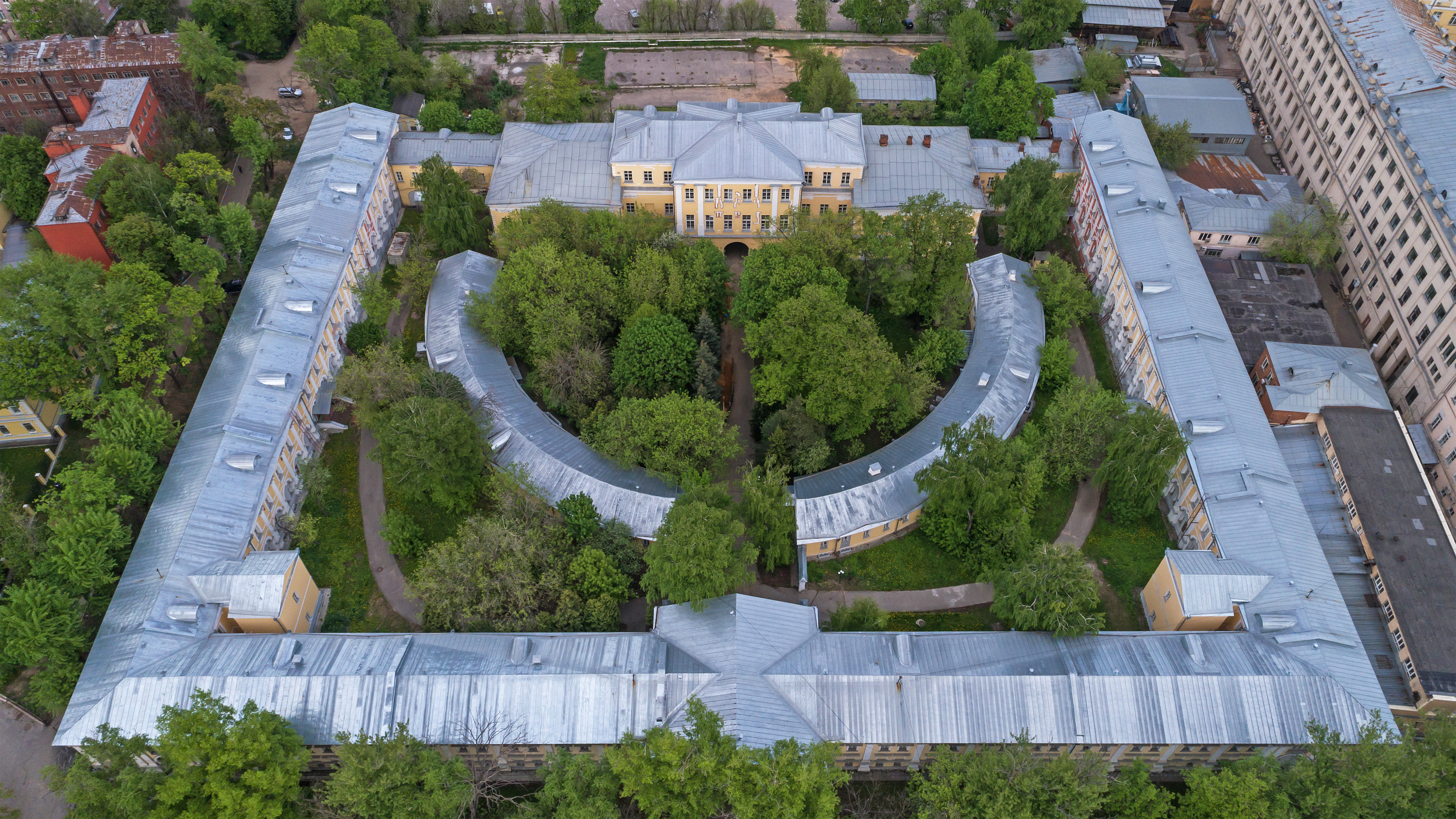
Lefortovo Palace, Moscow

In early 1707, Peter the Great gave Menshikov the Palace of François Le Fort, built in 1699 under the direction of Dmitry Aksamitov. Menshikov found the palace unsatisfactory in terms of both its size and architectural style. From 1707 to 1709, Fontana oversaw the reconstruction of the palace, altering its original appearance. Wings were added to the existing building, and an enclosed courtyard sealed off by a ceremonial gateway was incorporated into the complex. According to Igor Grabar, the palace's architecture was inspired by Jacopo Barozzi da Vignola The Five Orders of Architecture (the arcades in the inner courtyard, for example, are based on designs by Vignola).

=== Menshikov Palace ===
Construction of the palace began in May 1710 based on plans by Giovanni Mario Fontana and Gottfried Johann Schädel. Designed in the Petrine Baroque style, it was completed by 1714. While most of the construction was complete by 1714, the interiors were not finished until 1727. Peter the Great referred to the palace as the 'House of Embassies' and frequently hosted prestigious banquets and dinners there. The palace was restored in the 1970s and now houses a branch of the Hermitage Museum.

=== The Grand Menshikov Palace at Oranienbaum ===
The Grand Menshikov Palace is the most impressive architectural monument in the Oranienbaum park and palace complex. Built between 1711 and 1727, it was commissioned by Prince Menshikov. Fontana oversaw the initial phase of construction, after which Gottfried Johann Schädel took over. The palace has been undergoing restoration since 1995, and has been partially open to the public since 2011.

== Bibliography ==
- T. A Gatova, Giovanni Fontana/ Т. А. Гатова. Джованни Мария Фонтана. // Зодчие Москвы XV—XIX вв. Московский рабочий, 1981. С. 29, 30, 31.
- Nikolaeva, Marija (2007). "Architetti e maestranze nei cantieri moscoviti (1700-1725) : note su alcuni contratti di lavoro conservati all'Archivio di Stato russo degli atti antichi". Mélanges de l'École française de Rome (in Italian). 119 (2): 421–426.
