= Lomonosov, Russia =

Lomonosov Ломоносов
- Municipal town
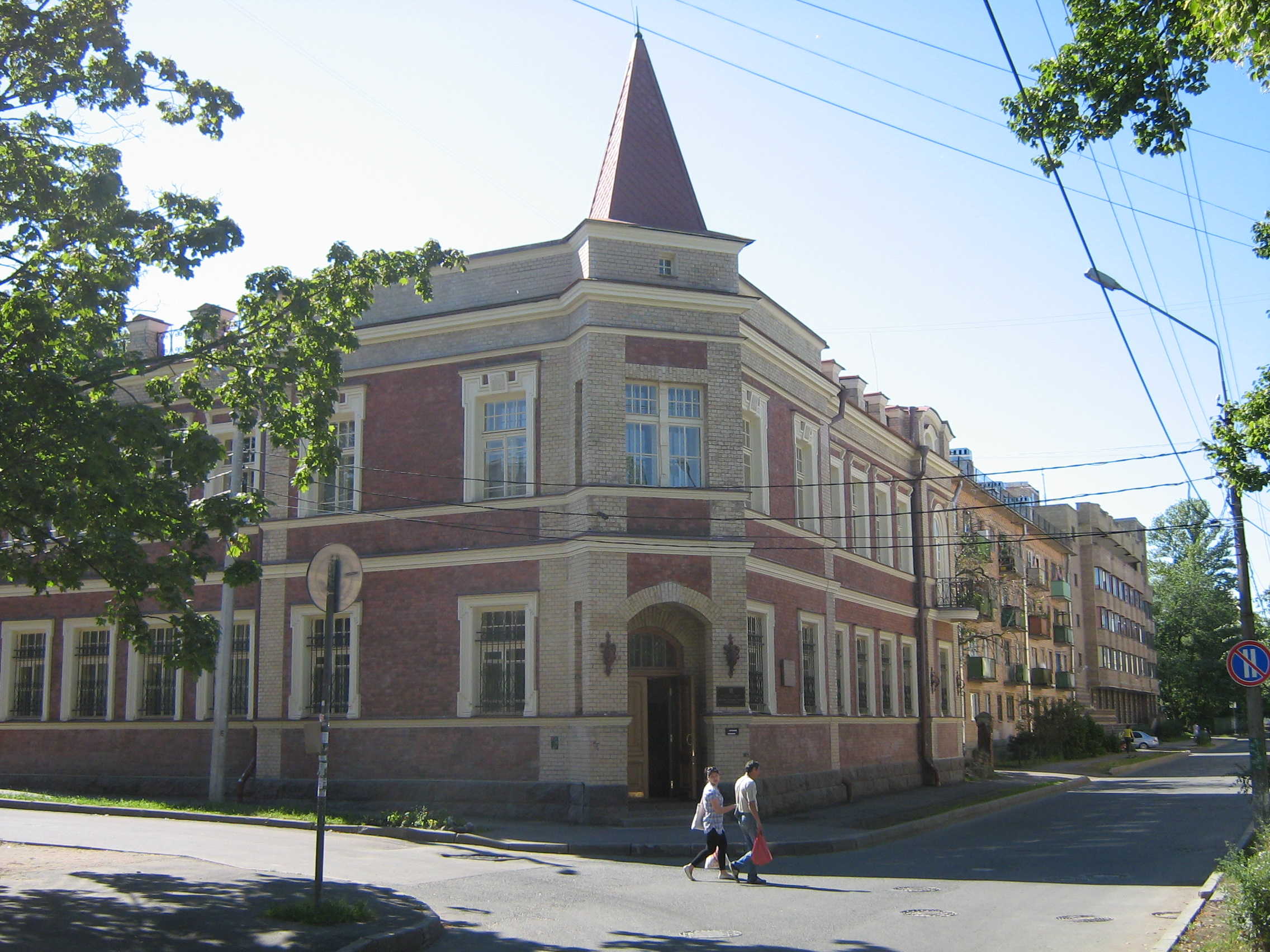
- Lomonosov Museum of Local History

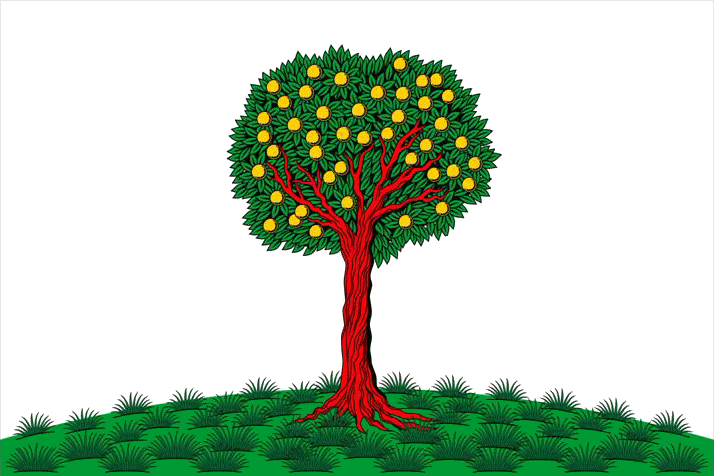
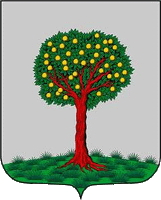
- Flag Coat of arms
- Interactive map of Lomonosov
- Location of Lomonosov Lomonosov (Saint Petersburg)
- Coordinates: 59°55′N 29°46′E
- Country: Russia
- Federal subject: Saint Petersburg
- Founded: 1710
- Elevation: 41 m (135 ft)

Population (2010 Census)
  - Total: 42,505
  - Estimate (2023): 39,088 (−8%)
- Time zone: UTC+
- Postal code: 198411–198412
- Dialing code: +7 812
- OKTMO ID: 40372000
- Website: web.archive.org/web/20071030081714/http://lomonosov.municip.ru//

Location of Lomonosov in St. Petersburg

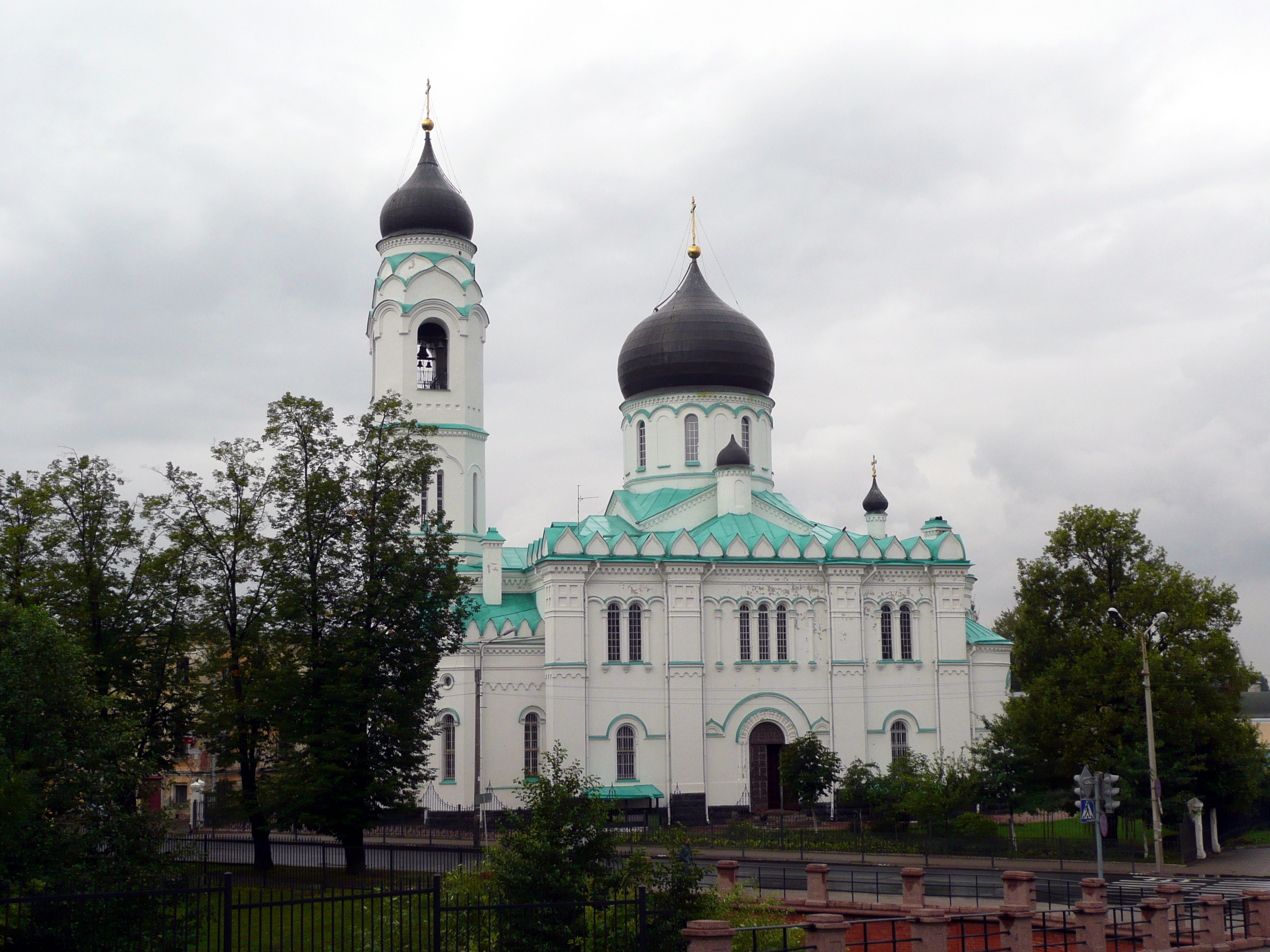
Cathedral of St. Michael the Archangel

Lomonosov (Russian: Ломоно́сов; before 1948: Oranienbaum, Ораниенба́ум) is a municipal town in Petrodvortsovy District of the federal city of Saint Petersburg, Russia, located on the southern coast of the Gulf of Finland, 40 kilometers (25 mi) west of Saint Petersburg proper. Population: 42,505 (2010 census); 37,776 (2002 census). Lomonosov is the site of the 18th-century royal Oranienbaum park and palace complex, notable as being the only palace in the vicinity of Saint Petersburg that was not captured by Nazi Germany during World War II.

== History ==
Oranienbaum was granted town status in 1710, and was initially applied to the Oranienbaum palace complex, built between 1710 and 1725 opposite Kronstadt, in the neighbourhood of the royal residence Peterhof Palace, by the architects Giovanni Mario Fontana and Gottfried Johann Schadel, and was intended for Alexander Menshikov, a close associate of Peter the Great. The original name of the town translates to "orange tree" in German (in modern German, the word is Orangenbaum) and is believed to have been derived from the palace complex which had greenhouses to grow exotic plants such as orange trees. According to another version, the name means “Tree of Orange” in honour of William III of Orange, stadtholder of the Netherlands and king of England, who was the idol of Peter the Great, or it was borrowed from the toponymy of Germany (the city of Oranienbaum in the Principality of Anhalt named by Princess Henrietta Katharina Nassau-Oransky after her home place) simply as a “beautiful” name in the fashion spirit of the Petrine era.

During World War II, the town was heavily involved in the Siege of Leningrad, where Red Army forces managed to establish a foothold at Oranienbaum, in the rear of the forces of Nazi Germany. This foothold had a major importance in the launching of the Leningrad–Novgorod Offensive in early 1944, which finally ended the siege. In 1948, the town was renamed to its current name Lomonosov, in honor of the scientist, poet and glassblower Mikhail Lomonosov. In 1754, Lomonosov had founded a colored-glass factory near Oranienbaum, in the village of Ust-Ruditsa. An unofficial nickname, Rambov, a Russified contraction of the old name Oranienbaum, is popular among the local residents.

Lomonosov can be reached by suburban train from St. Petersburg's Baltic Terminal to Oranienbaum Station.

== People from Oranienbaum ==
- Igor Stravinsky (1882–1971), composer of modern classical music
- Aleksandr Mostovoi, footballer

== International relations ==
=== Twin towns and sister cities ===
Lomonosov is twinned with:

- Mariehamn, Åland, Finland
- Framingham, Massachusetts, United States
- Anacortes, Washington, United States
- Oberursel (Taunus), Hesse, Germany (suspended in 2022)

== Gallery ==
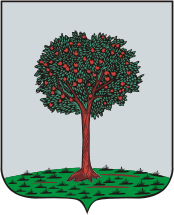
Coat of arms of Lomonosov (Oranienbaum)-1780

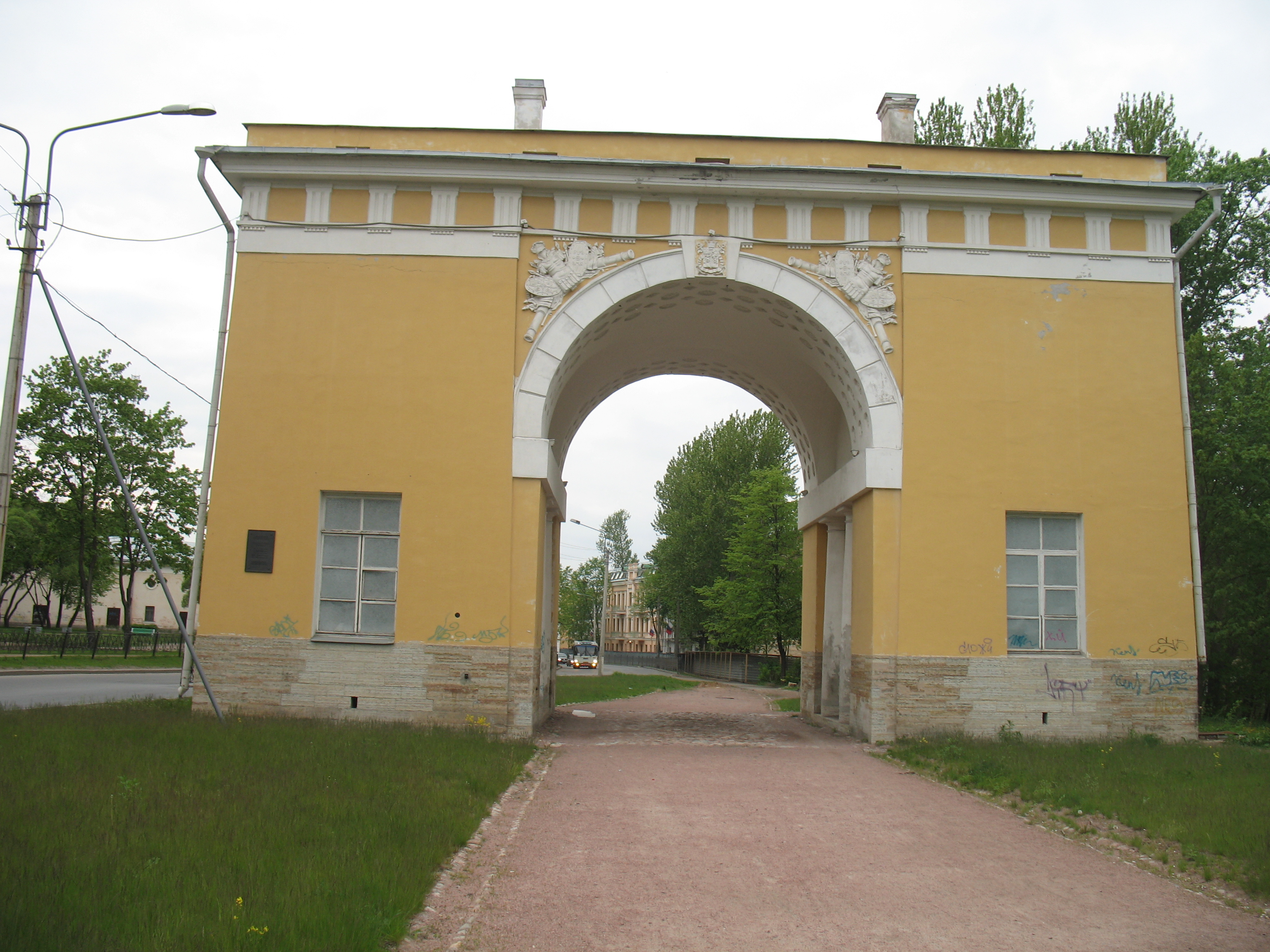
City gate of Lomonosov

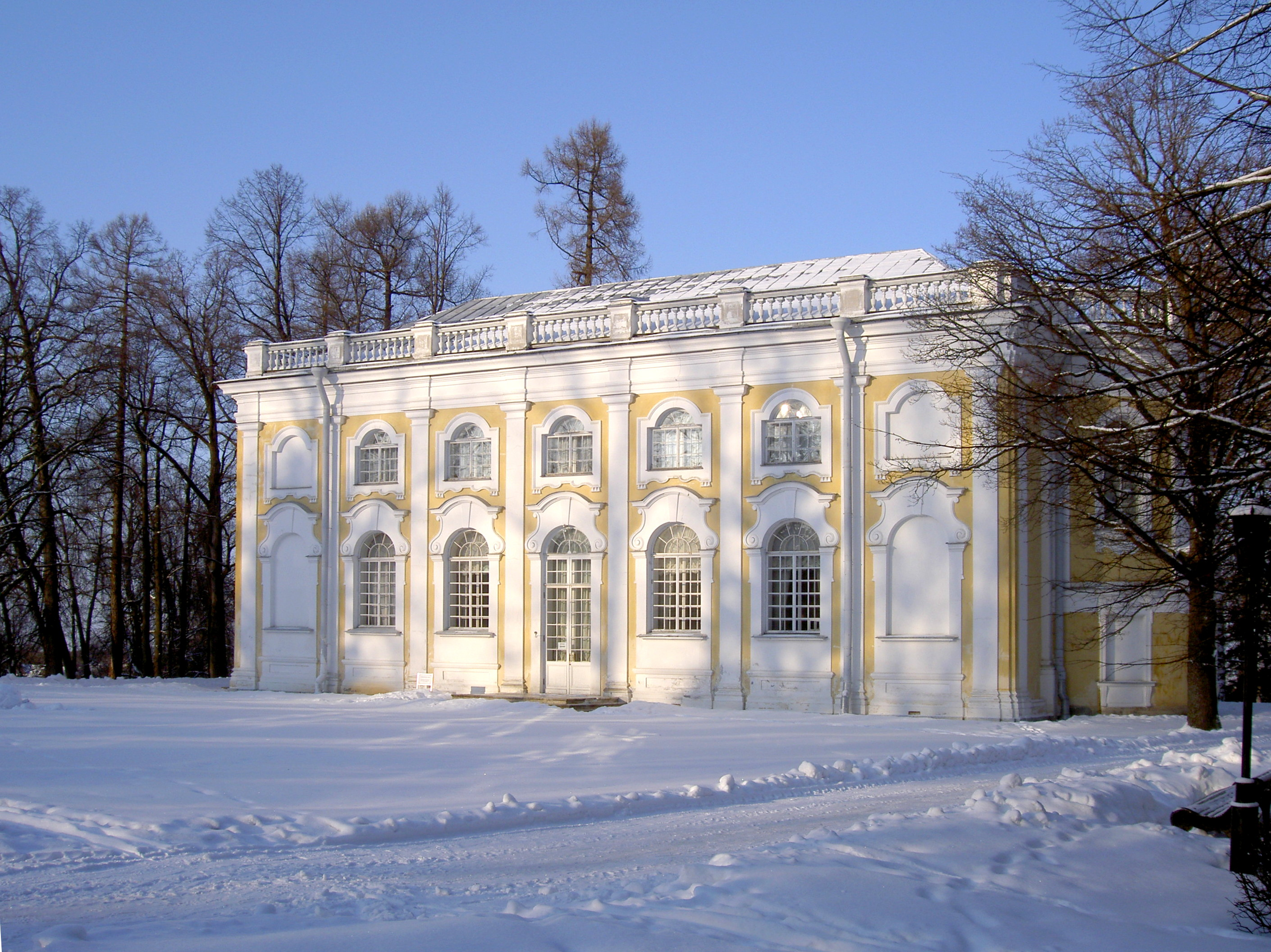
Kammenoye pavilion at the palace complex of Oranienbaum

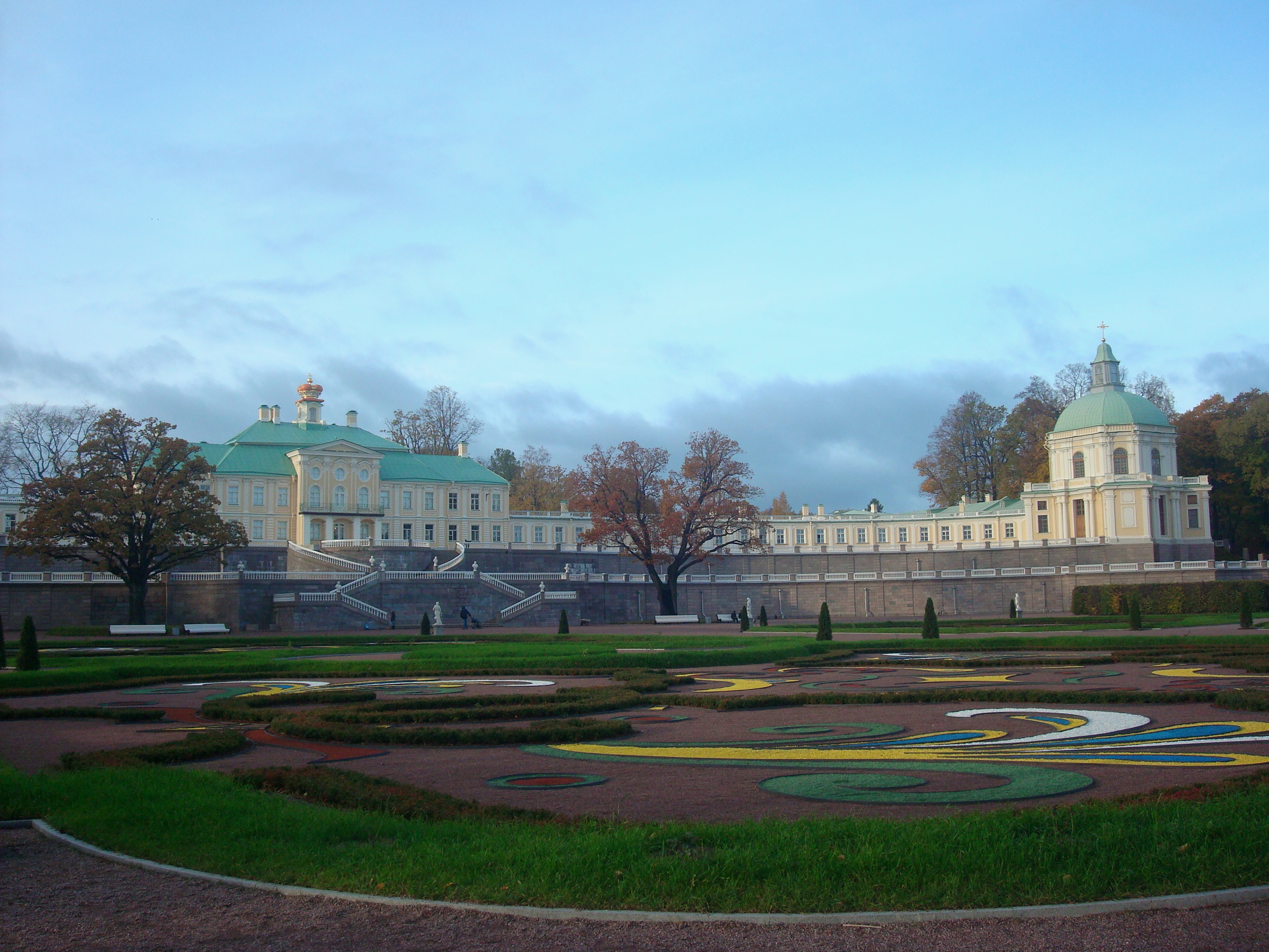
Grand Menshikov Palace

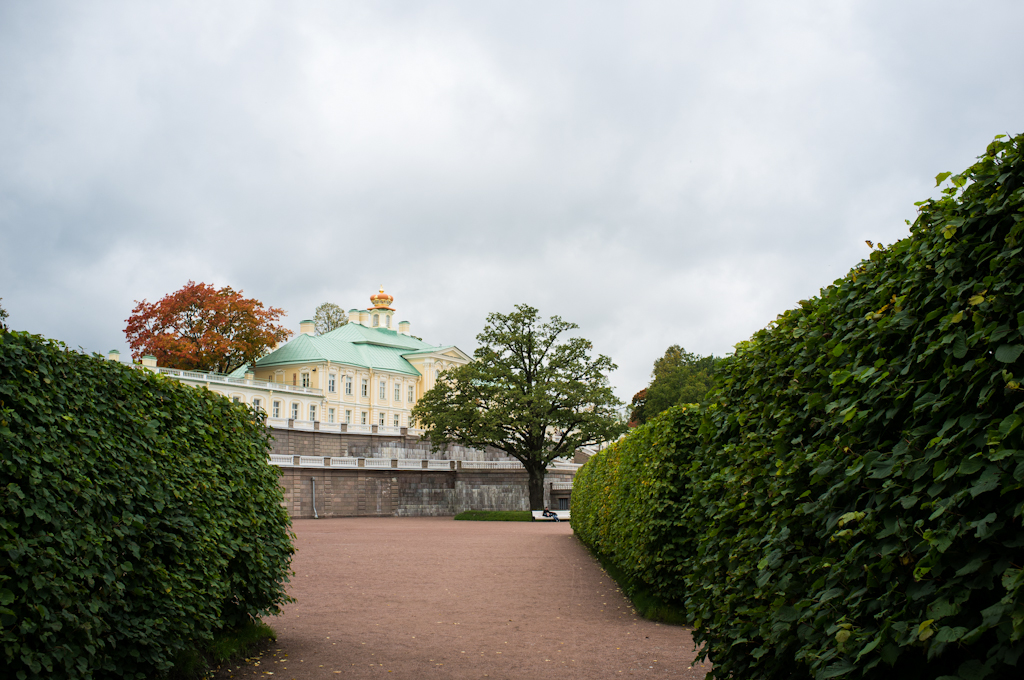
Grand Menshikov Palace

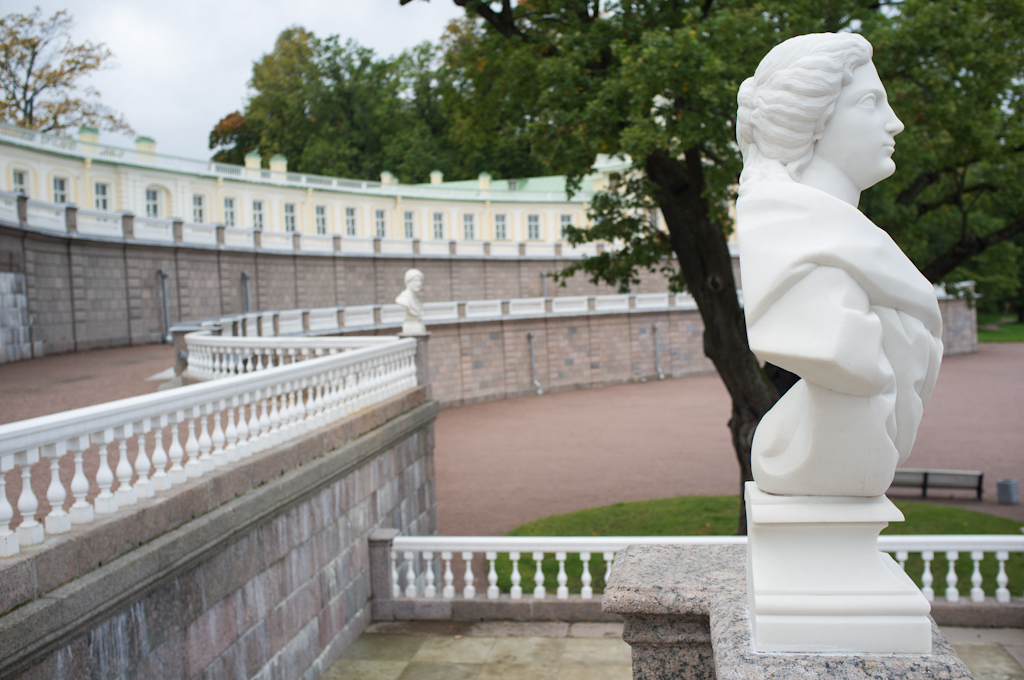
Grand Menshikov Palace

== See also ==
- Martyshkino
