= Menshikov Palace (Saint Petersburg) =

Building in Saint Petersburg, Russia

Coordinates: 59.939°N 30.296°E

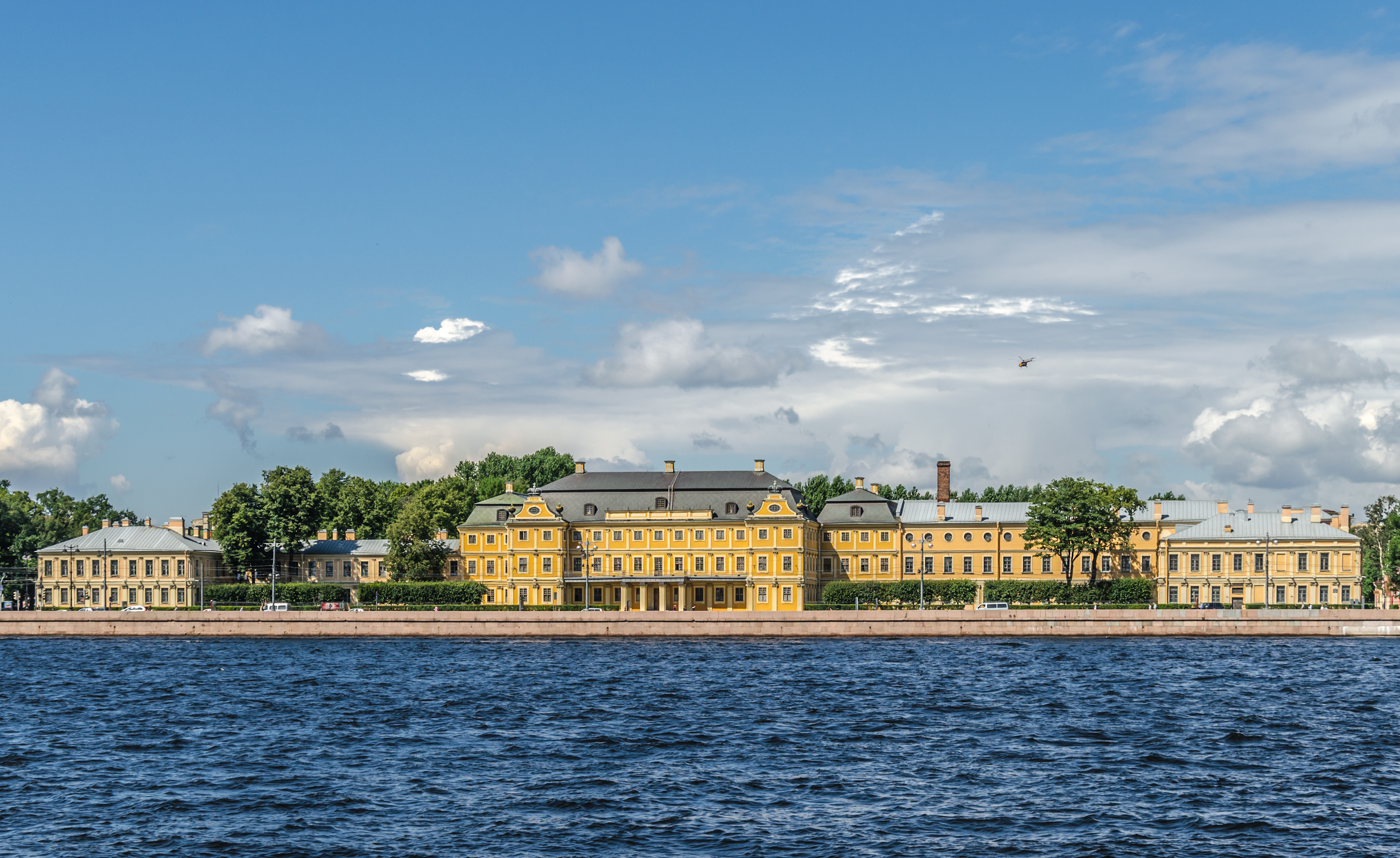

The Menshikov Palace (Russian: Меншиковский дворец) is a Petrine Baroque edifice in Saint Petersburg, situated on Universitetskaya Embankment of the Bolshaya Neva on Vasilyevsky Island. Since 1981, it has served as a public museum, a branch of the Hermitage Museum.

The palace was founded in 1710 as a residence of Saint Petersburg Governor General Alexander Menshikov and built by Italian architects Giovanni Maria Fontana, and, later, German architect Gottfried Johann Schädel. It was opened in 1711 (314 years ago), but the construction continued until 1727 (assisted by Domenico Trezzini, Bartolomeo Rastrelli, Georg Johann Mattarnovy and Jean-Baptiste Le Blond), when Menshikov with his family was exiled to Siberia and his property was confiscated.

In 1731, the First Cadet Corps were established and occupied the palace and neighboring buildings. At the end of the 19th century the Menshikov Palace was restored and became the museum of the Corps. From June to July 1917, the First All-Russian Congress of Soviets of Workers' and Soldiers' Deputies was held in the building. In 1924, its collections were moved to the Hermitage and other museums. From 1956 to 1981, the Menshikov Palace was restored again and finally opened to the public as a branch of the Hermitage Museum with a collection of Russian art of the late 17th-early 18th century.

== See also ==
- List of Baroque residences

== Sources ==
- Калязина Н. В. Меншиковский дворец-музей. 2nd ed. Leningrad: Lenizdat, 1989. ISBN 5-289-00467-X.
