= Great Neva =

River in Russia

Coordinates: 59.934°N 30.283°E

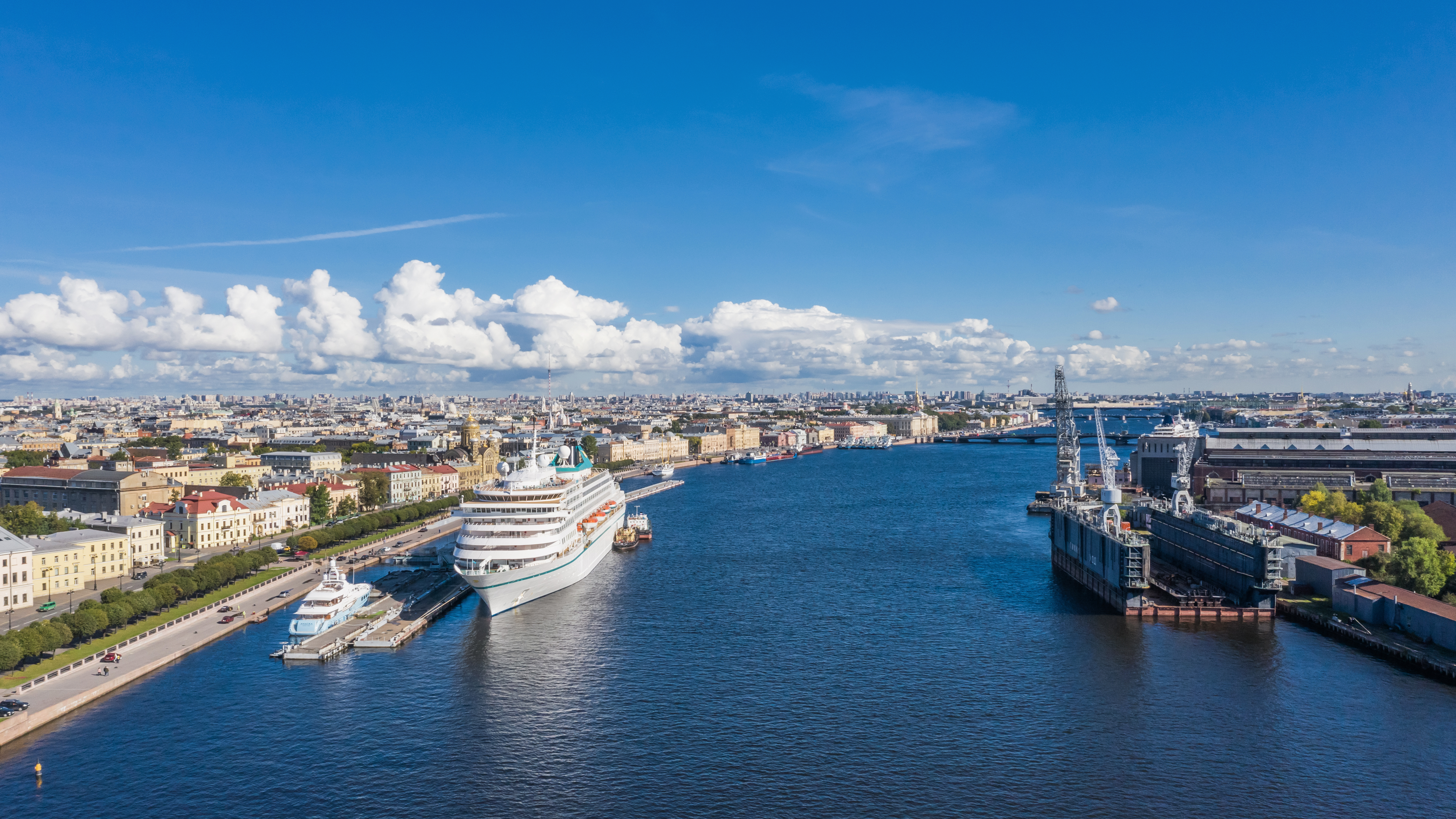
Great Neva

The Great Neva or Bolshaya Neva (Russian: Больша́я Нева́) is the largest armlet of the river Neva. It starts near the Spit of Vasilievsky Island (easternmost tip of the island). The Great Neva is 3.5 kilometres (2.2 mi) long; the width is from 200 to 400 metres (660 to 1,310 ft) and the depth up to 12.8 metres (42 ft). Its tributaries are Fontanka, Moyka and Novo-Admiralteysky Canal. There are two bridges across Great Neva: Palace Bridge and Blagoveshchensky Bridge.
