= Bolshoye Selo =

Bolshoye Selo (Russian: Большое Село) is the name of several rural localities in Russia:

- Bolshoye Selo, Arkhangelsk Oblast, a village in Zachachyevsky Selsoviet of Kholmogorsky District of Arkhangelsk Oblast
- Bolshoye Selo, Kaliningrad Oblast, a settlement under the administrative jurisdiction of the town of district significance of Neman in Nemansky District of Kaliningrad Oblast
- Bolshoye Selo, Ryazan Oblast, a selo in Bolsheselsky Rural Okrug of Pronsky District of Ryazan Oblast
- Bolshoye Selo, Vologda Oblast, a village in Kadnikovsky Selsoviet of Sokolsky District of Vologda Oblast
- Bolshoye Selo, Yaroslavl Oblast, a selo in Bolsheselsky Rural Okrug of Bolsheselsky District of Yaroslavl Oblast
