= Abashev =

Abashev (Russian: Аба́шев; masculine) or Abasheva (Аба́шева; feminine) is a Russian last name. Variants of this last name include Abashenko (Абаше́нко), Abashin/Abashina (Аба́шин/Аба́шина), Abashkin/Abashkina (Аба́шкин/Аба́шкина), Abashichev/Abashicheva (Аба́шичев/Аба́шичева), Abashkov/Abashkova (Аба́шков/Аба́шкова), and Abashurov/Abashurova (Абашу́ров/Абашу́рова).

There are two theories regarding the origins of these last names. The first one relates them to nicknames "Абаш" (Abash) and "Абаша" (Abasha), the diminutive forms of which are "Абашка" (Abashka), "Абашко" (Abashko), and "Абашур" (Abashur). Patronymic "Абашич" (Abashich) is also derived from these nicknames. The nickname itself has either Russian or Turkic origins. In Russian, it could have been given to people who overused the dialectal Russian word "або" (abo; meaning or, if only, so that)—in this case the suffix "-аш-" (-ash-) is a standard means of forming a name. The Turkic origin theory is more plausible and traces the nickname to the Turkic root "aba" (meaning an uncle on the father's side), to which diminutive suffix "-š" was added.

The other theory traces these last names, in particular Abashin and Abashkin, to the Christian male first name Avvakum.

People with the last name

- Natalya Abasheva, wife of Boris Stark, Russian missionary and priest
- Timur Abashev, member of the Russian team participating in Men's 4x7.5 km relay during the Biathlon European Championships 2007
- Vladimir Abashev (b. 1954), Russian philologist
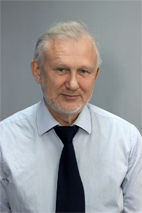
  Vladimir Abashev in 2014

== See also ==
- Abashevo, several rural localities in Russia
