= Abashevo =

Abashevo (Russian: Абашево) is the name of several rural localities in Russia:

- Abashevo, Chuvash Republic, a selo in Abashevskoye Rural Settlement of Cheboksarsky District in the Chuvash Republic
- Abashevo, Nizhny Novgorod Oblast, a village in Butakovsky Selsoviet of Voznesensky District in Nizhny Novgorod Oblast; 54°48′34″N 42°48′02″E
- Abashevo, Penza Oblast, a selo in Abashevsky Selsoviet of Spassky District in Penza Oblast
- Abashevo, Samara Oblast, a selo in Khvorostyansky District of Samara Oblast; 52°41′N 48°40′E
- Abashevo, Udmurt Republic, a village in Shamardanovsky Selsoviet of Yukamensky District in the Udmurt Republic; 57°59′35″N 52°08′12″E
- Abashevo, Yaroslavl Oblast, a village in Blagoveshchensky Rural Okrug of Bolsheselsky District in Yaroslavl Oblast
