= Abushev =

Abushev is a surname. Notable people with the surname include:

- Magomedgasan Abushev (born 1959), Soviet Russian sport wrestler
- Rangel Abushev (born 1989), Bulgarian footballer
- Rasim Abushev (born 1963), Azerbaijani footballer

== See also ==
- Abashev
