= Abashevo, Yaroslavl Oblast =

Abashevo Абашево
- Village
- Location within Yaroslavl Oblast Location within Russia
- Coordinates: 57°49′N 39°00′E
- Country: Russia
- Region: Yaroslavl Oblast
- District: Bolsheselsky District
- Time zone: [[UTC+3:00]]

Abashevo (Russian: Абашево) is a rural locality (a village) in Blagoveschenskoye Rural Settlement of Bolsheselsky District, Yaroslavl Oblast, Russia. The population was 22 as of 2007.

== Geography ==
Abashevo is located 16 km north of Bolshoye Selo (the district's administrative centre) by road. Medvedevo is the nearest rural locality.
