= Taytsy =

Taytsy Тайцы
- Urban-type settlement
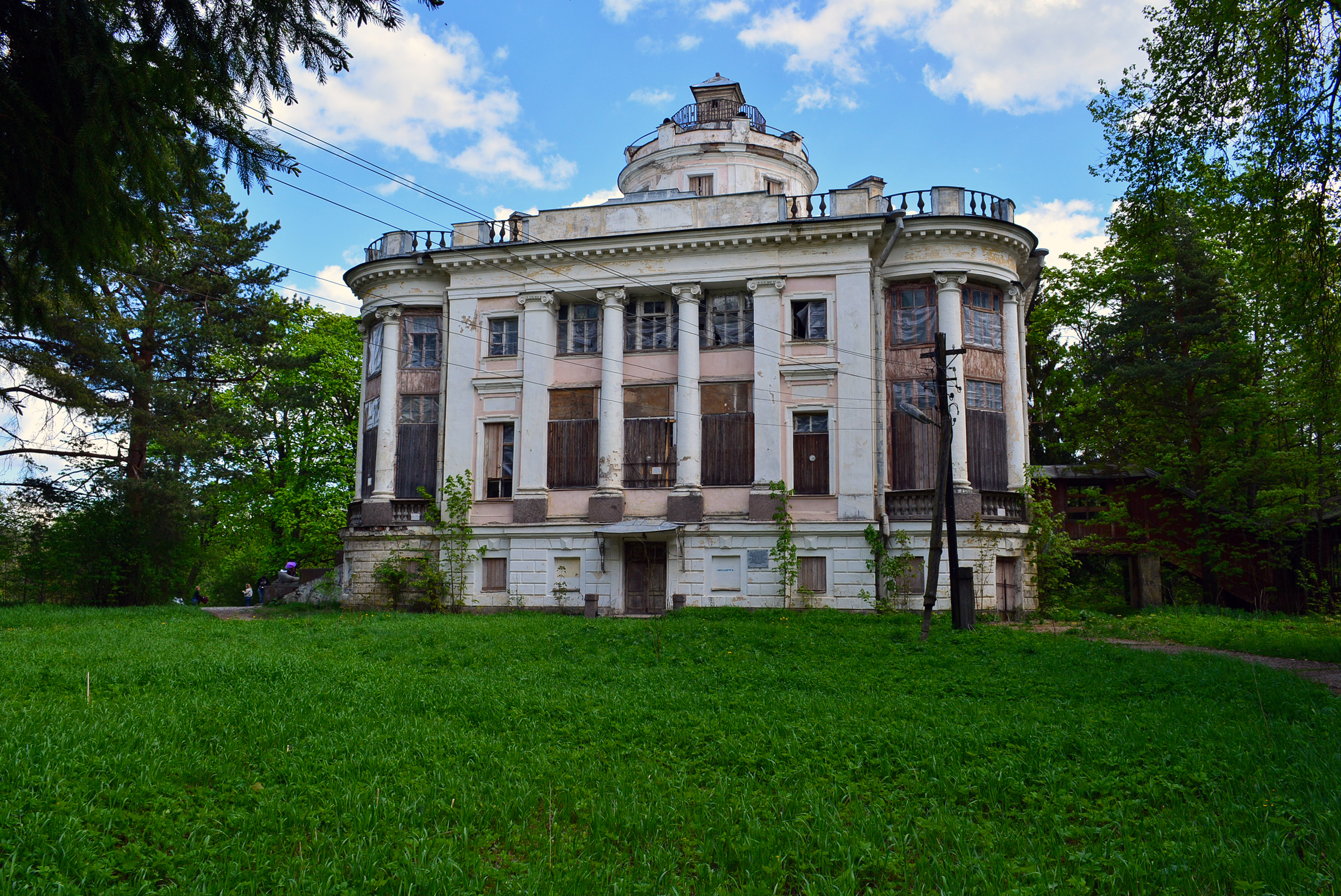
- Interactive map of Taytsy
- Location of Taytsy Taytsy (Leningrad Oblast)
- Coordinates: 59°40′N 30°07′E
- Country: Russia
- Federal subject: Leningrad Oblast
- Administrative district: Gatchinsky District
- Urban-type settlement status since: 1960

Population (2010 Census)
  - Total: 2,853
  - Estimate (2024): 5,093 (+78.5%)

Municipal status
  - Municipal district: Gatchinsky Municipal District
  - Urban settlement: Tayitskoye Urban Settlement
  - Capital of: Tayitskoye Urban Settlement
- Time zone: UTC+3 (MSK)
- Postal code: 188340
- OKTMO ID: 41618176051
- Website: www.taici.ru

Taytsy (Russian: Та́йцы) is an urban locality (an urban-type settlement) in Gatchinsky District of Leningrad Oblast, Russia, located north of the town of Gatchina. Population: 2,853 (2010 census); 2,644 (2002 census); 2,929 (1989 Soviet census). Taitsy is home to the Demidov Estate, a World Heritage Site.

== History ==
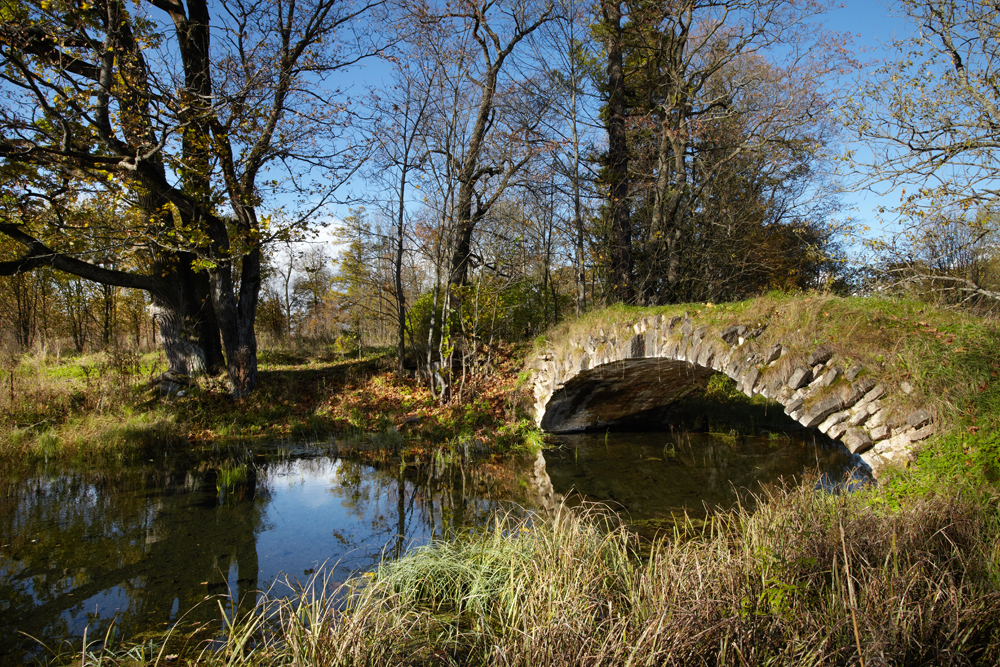
The park in the former Demidov Estate.

Taytsy is known since the 1720s, when Peter the Great gave the surrounding lands to Ivan Golovin. The estate was eventually split, and the part which is currently located in the settlement of Taytsy was sold to Alexander Demidov, an owner of metal plants in the Urals. In the 1770s, the architect Ivan Starov, a brother-in-law of Demidov, created in the estate an architectural ensemble consisting of a park and a number of buildings.

In the end of the 19th century, Taytsy belonged to Tsarskoselsky Uyezd of Saint Petersburg Governorate (renamed in 1913 Petrograd Governorate and in 1924 Leningrad Governorate). On November 20, 1918 the uyezd was renamed Detskoselsky. On February 14, 1923 Detskoselsky and Petergofsky Uyezds were abolished and merged into Gatchinsky Uyezd, with the administrative center located in Gatchina. On February 14, 1923 Gatchina was renamed Trotsk, and Gatchinsky Uyezd was renamed Trotsky Uyezd, after Leon Trotsky.

On August 1, 1927, the uyezds were abolished and Trotsky District, with the administrative center in the town of Trotsk, was established. The governorates were also abolished, and the district was a part of Leningrad Okrug of Leningrad Oblast. Taytsy was made a part of Trotsky District. On August 2, 1929, after Trotsky was deported from Soviet Union, Trotsk was renamed Krasnogvardeysk, and the district was renamed Krasnogvardeysky. In May 1930, Taytsy was granted suburban settlement status. On July 23, 1930, the okrugs were abolished as well, and the districts were directly subordinated to the oblast. On January 28, 1944 Krasnogvardeysk was renamed Gatchina, and the district was renamed Gatchinsky. On July 1, 1960 Taytsy became an urban-type settlement.

== Economy ==
=== Industry ===
The Gatchina Meat Packing Plant is located in Taytsy.

=== Transportation ===
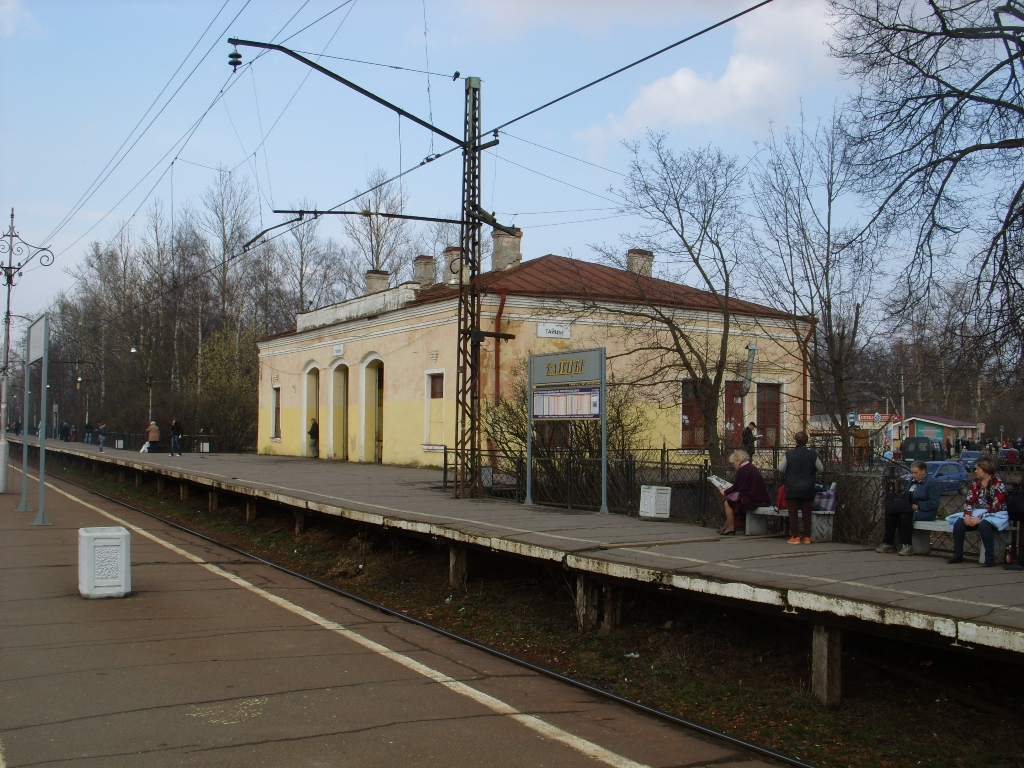
Taitsy railway station.

Taytsy is located on the railway line connecting Baltiysky railway station via Krasnoye Selo with Gatchina. There are regular suburban connections.

Taytsy is essentially a suburb of Saint Petersburg and is embedded in the suburban road network. In particular, it is connected by roads with Krasnoye Selo and with Gatchina.

== Culture and recreation ==
Taytsy contains twenty one cultural heritage monuments of federal significance and additionally three objects classified as cultural and historical heritage of local significance. The federal monuments are the buildings and the park of the former Demidov Estate, whereas the local monuments commemorate the events related to the Siege of Leningrad. The Demidov Estate is a part of World Heritage site Historic Centre of Saint Petersburg and Related Groups of Monuments.
