= Abashkin =

Abashkin (Russian: Абашкин; masculine) or Abashkina (Абашкина; feminine) is a Russian last name, a variant of Abashin or Abashev. It is shared by the following people:

- Vladimir Abashkin, husband of Yekaterina Guseva, Russian actress and singer
  - Alexey Abashkin and Anna Abashkina, their children
- Vladimir Abashkin, Russian ice hockey player; 2012 KHL Junior Draft pick from HC Donbass

== Sources ==
- Ю. А. Федосюк (Yu. A. Fedosyuk). "Русские фамилии: популярный этимологический словарь" (Russian Last Names: a Popular Etymological Dictionary). Москва, 2006. ISBN 978-5-89349-216-3
- И. М. Ганжина (I. M. Ganzhina). "Словарь современных русских фамилий" (Dictionary of Modern Russian Last Names). Москва, 2001. ISBN 5-237-04101-9
