= Historic Centre of Saint Petersburg and Related Groups of Monuments =

UNESCO World Heritage Site
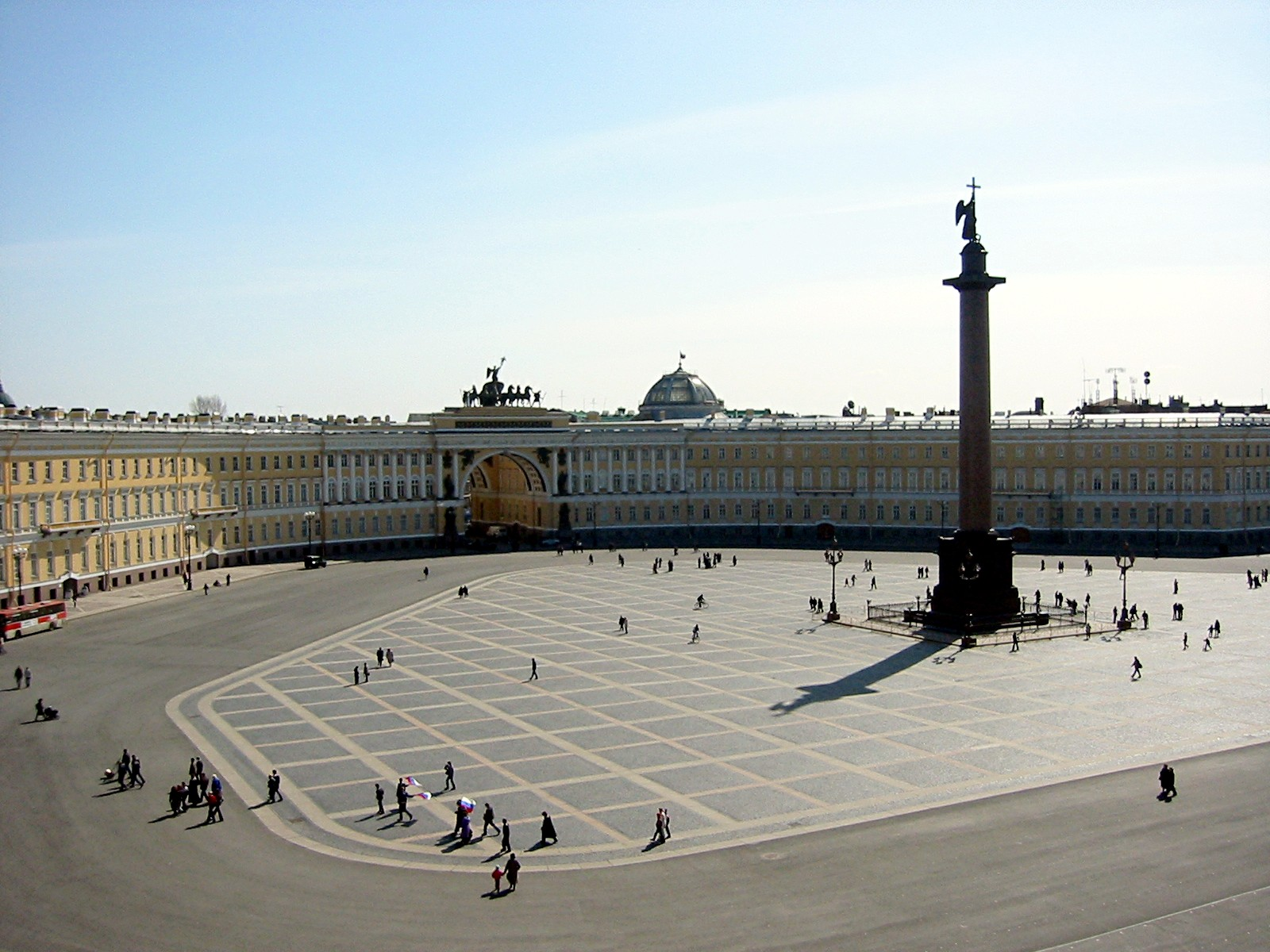

- Location within European Russia Location within Europe
- Location: Saint Petersburg, Russia
- Criteria: Cultural: (i), (ii), (iv), (vi)
- Reference: 540bis
- Inscription: 1990 (14th Session)
- Extensions: 2013
- Area: 3,934.1 ha (15.190 sq mi)
- Coordinates: 59°57′0″N 30°19′6″E

The Historic Centre of Saint Petersburg and Related Groups of Monuments is the name used by UNESCO when it collectively designated the historic core of the Russian city of St. Petersburg, as well as buildings and ensembles located in the immediate vicinity as a World Heritage Site in 1991.

The site was recognised for its architectural heritage, fusing Baroque, Neoclassical, and traditional Russian-Byzantine influences.

== Sites ==
The site contains 126 locations including the following objects,

1. Historic Centre of St. Petersburg
2. Historical Part of the Town of Kronstadt
3. Fortress of Kronstadt
  - Forts of the Island Kotlin
    - Redoubts Dena (Fort Den)
    - Fort Shanz
    - Fort Catherine
    - Fort Rift
    - Fort Constantin
    - Tolbukhin Signal Tower on Tolbukhin Island
  - Forts of the Gulf of Finland
    - Obrutchev Fort
    - Totleben Fort
    - North Forts Nos. 1-7
    - Paul Fort (Riesbank)
    - Kronshlot Fort
    - Alexander Fort ("Tchumny")
    - Peter Fort
    - South Forts Nos. 1-3
  - Forts of the Coast of the Gulf of Finland
    - Fort Lissy Noss
    - Fort Inno
    - Grey Horse Fort (Seraya Lochad)
    - Krasnaya Gorka fort (Red Hill)
  - Civil Engineering
    - the Barrier of Cribwork
    - the Barrier of Pile
    - the Barrier of Stone
4. Historical Centre of the Town of Petrokrepost (Shlisselburg)
5. The Oreshek Fortress on Orekhovy Island at the source of the Neva
6. Palaces and Park Ensembles of the Town of Pushkin and its Historical Centre
7. Palaces and Parks of the town of Pavlovsk and its Historical Centre
8. Pulkovo Observatory
9. Palace and Park Ensemble of the Village of Ropsha
10. Palace and Park Ensemble of the Village of Gostilitsy
11. Palace and Park Ensemble of the Village of Taytsy
12. Palace and Park Ensemble of the Town of Gatchina and its Historical Centre
13. Ensemble of the Coastal Monastery of Saint Sergius
14. Palace and Park Ensemble of the Town of Strelna and its Historical Centre
15. Palace and Park Ensemble "Mikhailovka"
16. Palace and Park Ensemble "Znamenka"
17. Palace and Park Ensemble of the Town of Petrodvorets and its Historical Centre
18. Palace and Park Ensemble "Sobstvennaya Datcha"
19. Palace and Park Ensemble "Sergeevka"
20. Palace and Park Ensembles of the Town of Lomonosov and its Historical Centre
  - Historical Centre of the Town of Lomonosov (Oranienbaum), including the Palace and Park Ensemble of the Upper Park and Lower Garden
  - Mordvinov's Estate
  - Maximov's Datcha
  - Zubov's Estate "Otrada"
  - Ratkov-Rozhnov's Estate "Dubki"
  - S. K. Grieg's Estate "Sans Ennui"
  - Datcha of the Hospital
21. Scientific Town-Institution of Physiologist I. P. Pavlov
22. Zinoviev's Estate
23. Shuvalov's Estate
24. Viazemsky's Estate
25. Sestroretsky Razliv
26. I. Repin Estate "The Penates"
27. Cemetery of the Village of Komarovo
28. Lindulovskaya Rotcsha
29. River Neva with Banks and Embankments
30. Izhorsky Bench (Glint)
31. Dudergofs Heights
32. Koltushi Elevation
33. Yukkovskaya Elevation
34. The Roads
  - Moskovskoye Highway
  - Kievskoye Highway
  - Railway Leningrad-Pavlovsk
  - the Highway Pushkin-Gatchina
  - Volkhovskoe Highway
  - Tallinskoye Highway
  - Peterhofskoye Highway
  - Ropshinskoye Highway
  - Gostilitskoye Highway
  - Primorskoye Highway
  - Vyborgskoye Highway
  - Koltushskoye Highway
35. Canals
  - Ligovsky Canal
  - the Maritime Channel
  - Petrovsky canal
  - Kronstadsky canal
  - Zelenogorsky canal
36. The Green Belt of Glory
  - the Blockade Ring
  - the Road of Life
  - Oranienbaumsky Spring-Board
