= Attack on Kronstadt (1704) =

Swedish assault on Kronstadt in 1704

- Part of the Great Northern War
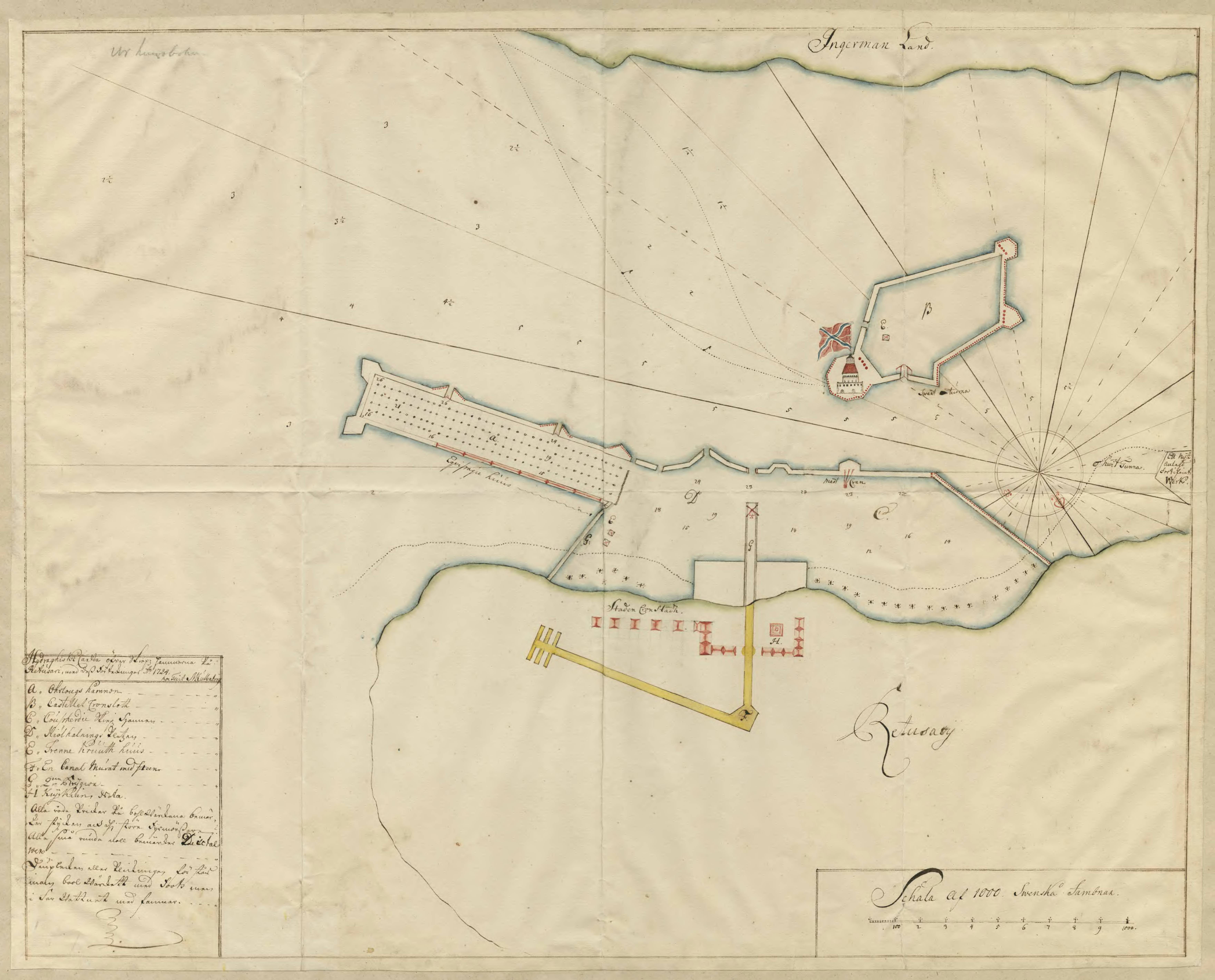
- 1724 drawing of Kotlin Island and Kronstadt
Date	8 July 1704
Location	Kronstadt, Kotlin Island 59°59′27″N 29°46′29″E
Result	Inconclusive

Belligerents
(yes) Sweden	Russia

Commanders and leaders
(yes) Jacob De Prou	Unknown

Units involved
Unknown	Kronstadt garrison

Strength
1–2 ship(s) of the line 5–8 frigates 5 brigantines Several smaller ships 1,000 men	500 men

Casualties and losses
None	All guns taken

The attack on Kronstadt occurred on 8 July 1704 during the Great Northern War. After the construction of Kronslot on the newly captured island of Kotlin by Russia, a Swedish fleet of 1–2 ship(s) of the line, 5–8 frigates, 5 brigantines, several smaller ships, and 1,000 men sailed towards the island. The Swedes landed on the island, proceeding to defeat 500 Russian troops stationed in 2 redoubts and took their artillery. After an inconclusive shelling of the island, the Swedes withdrew.

== Background ==
After conquering the island of Kotlin from the Swedes in 1703 along with Nyen and Nöteborg, Russia began construction of a fortress on the island, which they named Kronslot. Early on, it consisted of a three tiered tower which had been designed by Peter I personally. The fortress' purpose was to defend the entrance to the planned city of Saint Petersburg.

== Attack ==
In the summer of 1704, a Swedish fleet of 1–2 ship(s) of the line, 5–8 frigates, several smaller ships, 5 brigantines, and 1,000 men led by Jacob De Prou sailed towards Kronstadt with the mission to "cover His Majesty's sea coasts from hostile invasions and incursions", along with destroying the makings of a Russian Baltic fleet stationed there. It arrived in Kotlin on 8 July, but soon found that the Russian positions were already significantly strong. Despite this, de Prou landed his 1,000 men and assaulted two redoubts defended by 500 Russian troops. After defeating these, the Swedes took all of their artillery. Even after defeating the 500 Russians, de Prou was forced to withdraw after his inconclusive shelling of the fortifications and ships on the island.

== Aftermath ==
In his report to Charles XII after the attack, he described the need to withdraw because of the Russians' "condition at sea was in a much better condition than could ever have been believed or imagined". However, he emphasized attacking the fortress with adequate forces since "the sooner the better to be ruined and thrown overboard to be able to prohibit him from eventually bringing a naval power in the Baltic Sea, to the detriment and expense of Your Royal Majesty and its council, to which he has already made such a beginning."

== See also ==
- Siege of Narva (1704) – 1704 siege during the Great Northern War

== Works cited ==
- Wolke, Lars Ericson [in Swedish] (2025). Mot Sankt Petersburg! Den karolinska arméns desperata kamp 1708 [Towards Saint Petersburg! The desperate struggle of the Carolean army in 1708] (in Swedish). Carlssons.
- Wolke, Lars Ericson (14 September 2012). Sjöslag och rysshärjningar: Kampen om Östersjön under stora nordiska kriget 1700-1721 [Naval battles and Russian pillaging: the struggle for the Baltic Sea during the Great Northern War 1700-1721] (in Swedish). Norstedts. ISBN 9789113030425.
- Unger, Gunnar [in Swedish] (1945). "Jacob De Prou". sok.riksarkivet.se (in Swedish). National Archives of Sweden.
- Akiander, Matthias [in Swedish] (1854). Finlands minnesvärde män: Samling af lefnadsteckningar [Finland's memorable men. Collection of life sketches] (in Swedish). Vol. 1. Helsinki: J. C. Frenckell & Söner.
