= Fort Constantin (Russia) =

Coastal fort in Russia

Coordinates: 59.9952°N 29.7017°E

Historic Centre of Saint Petersburg and Related Groups of Monuments. Defensive installations of the Fortress of Kronstadt. Forts of the Island Kotlin. Fort «Constantin»
UNESCO World Heritage Site
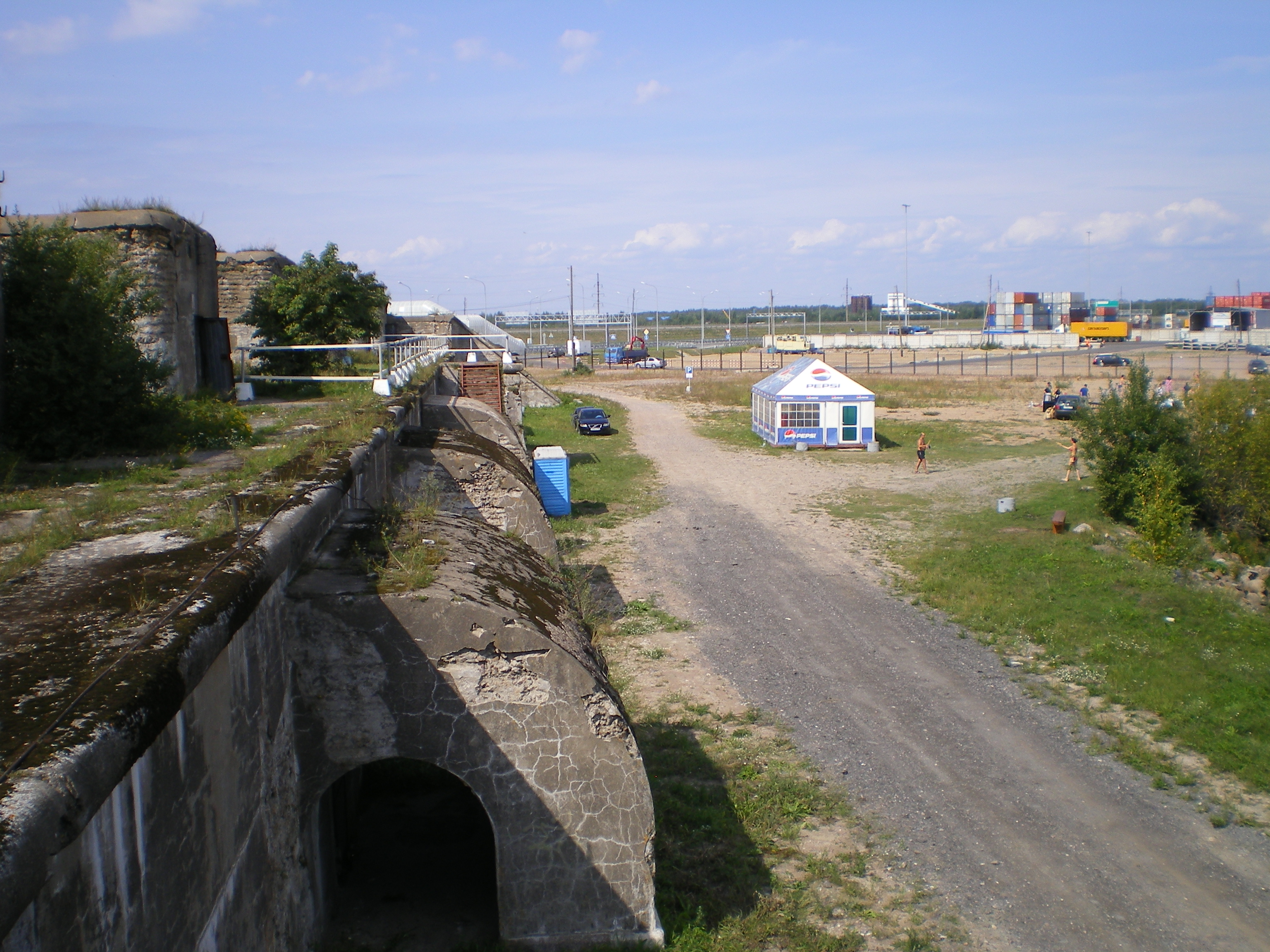
- Interactive map of Historic Centre of Saint Petersburg and Related Groups of Monuments. Defensive installations of the Fortress of Kronstadt. Forts of the Island Kotlin. Fort «Constantin»
- Reference: 540-003a3

The Fort Constantin (Fort Grand Duke Constantine, Fort Konstantin) (Russian: Форт «Константин», (Форт «Великий Князь Константин») was a coastal artillery battery that covered southern waters of the fortified city of Kronstadt, Russia. The city is located on the Kotlin Island, Gulf of Finland, Baltic Sea. Currently the fort has no military use, the structures are in disarray, and the transport and tourism company Third Park tries to develop the territory as a tourist destination.

== History ==
In 1807 Emperor Alexander I of Russia signed a decree to additionally fortify Kronstadt expecting a war with Great Britain. The construction started in 1808. The initial parapet of the battery was made of pine timber filled with sand and stone, for speed. It was made in two levels, hence the historical name "Double Southern Battery (Двойная Южная Батарея).
