= Abashin =

Abashin (Russian: Абашин; masculine) or Abashina (Абашина; feminine) is a Russian last name, a variant of which is Abashkin (Абашкин; masculine) or Abashkina (Абашкина; feminine). These last names derive from "Аба́ша" (Abasha) and "Аба́шка" (Abashka)—the diminutive forms of the first name Avvakum—although other theories explaining the origins of these nicknames also exist (cf. Abashev).

People with this last name

- Viktoriya Abashina, contestant on Dom-2, a Russian reality show
- Vladislav Abashin, actor from the 2008 Russian action movie Novaya Zemlya and the 2012 Russian drama movie In the Fog
