= Kronstadt =

Kronstadt Кронштадт
- Municipal town
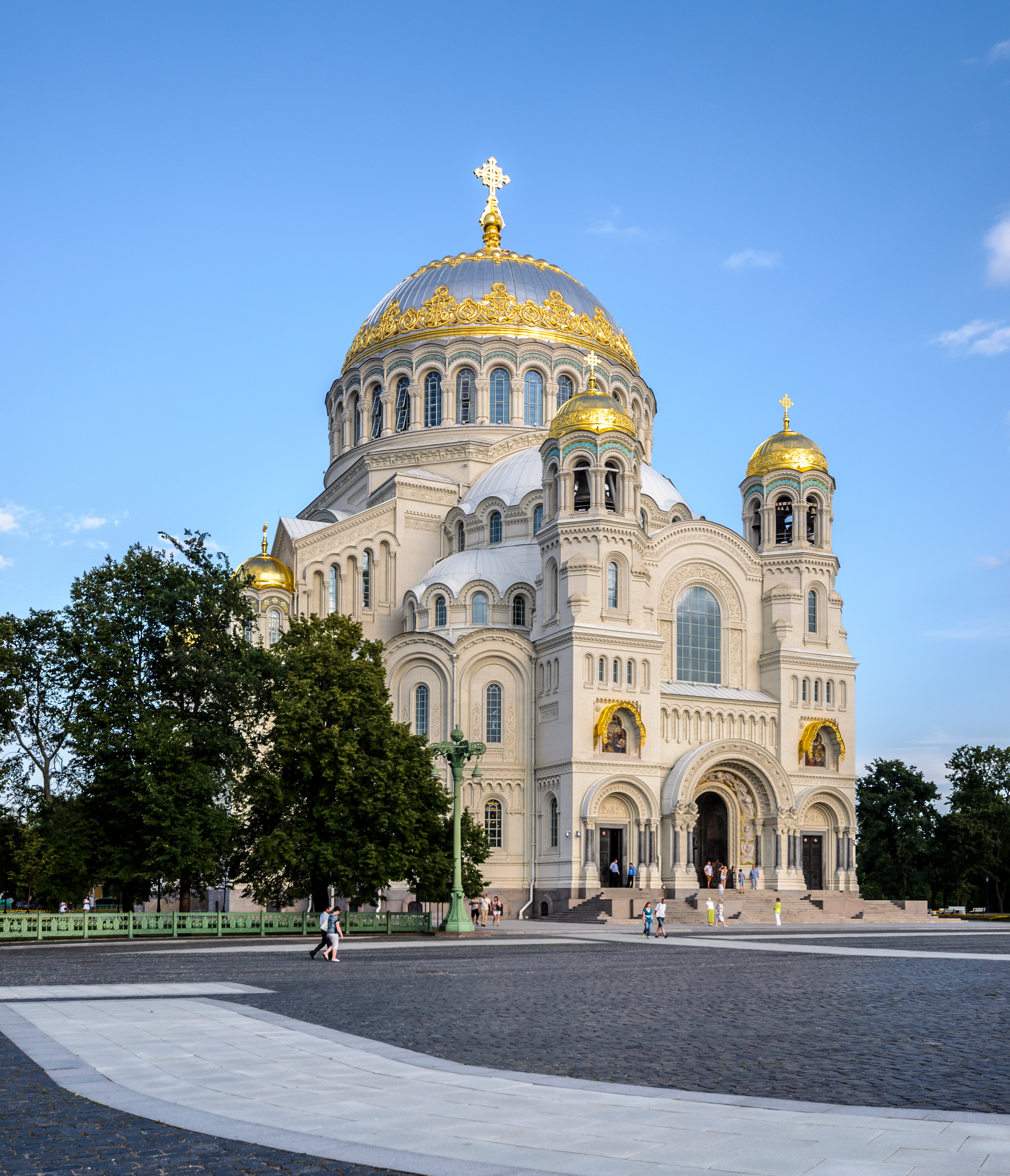
- The Naval Cathedral of St. Nicholas in Kronstadt

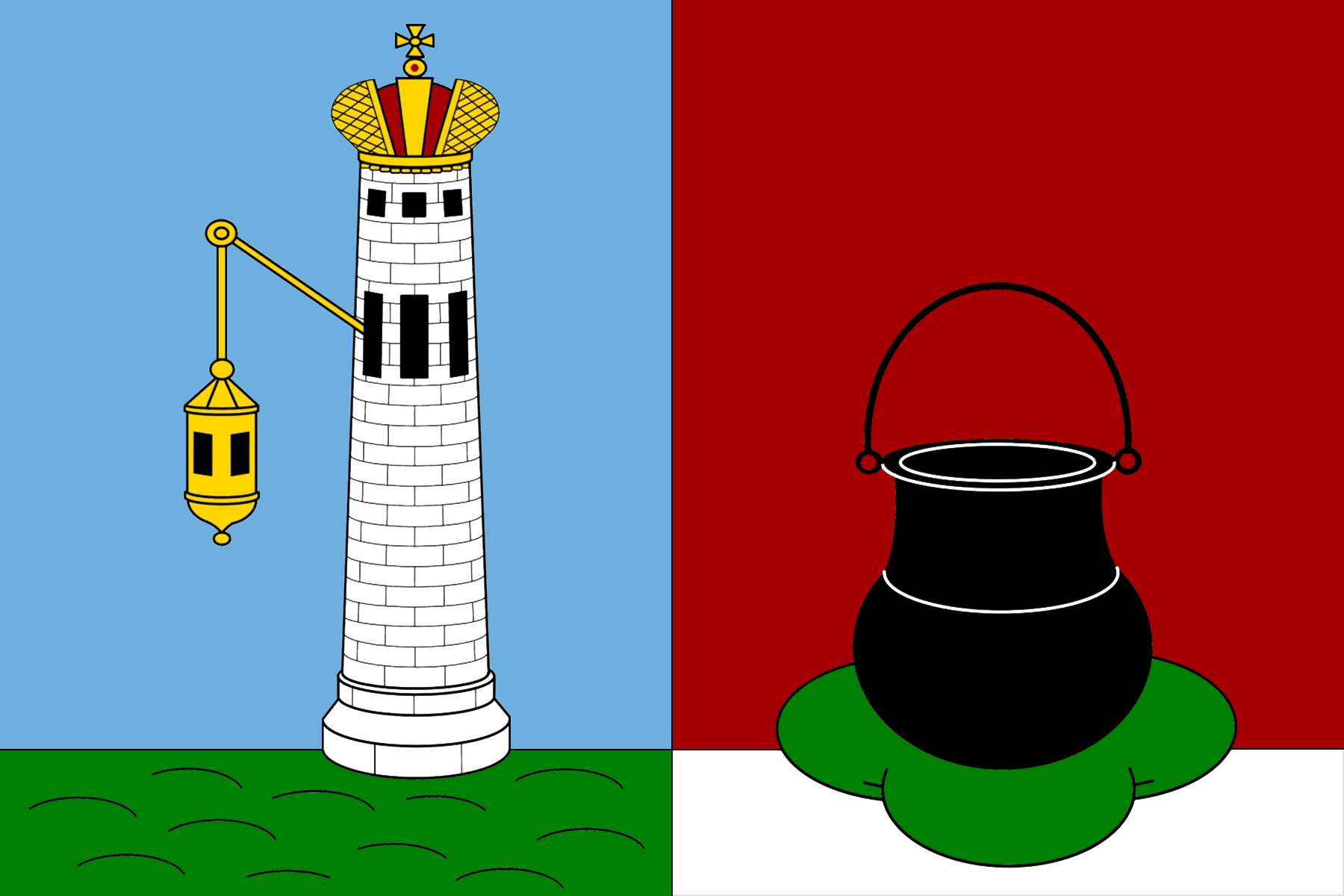
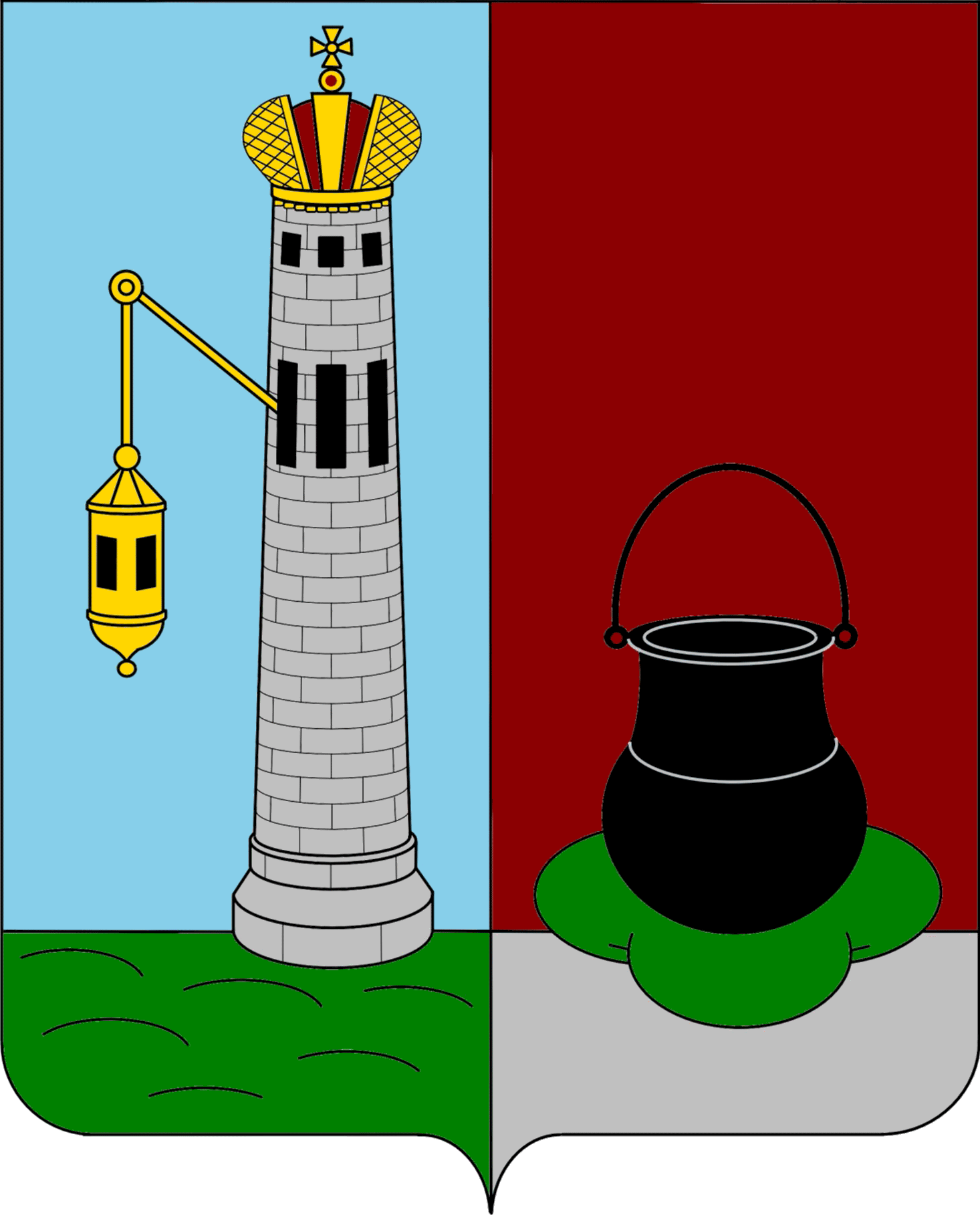
- Flag Coat of arms
- Interactive map of Kronstadt
- Location of Kronstadt Kronstadt (Saint Petersburg)
- Coordinates: 59°59′27″N 29°46′29″E
- Country: Russia
- Federal subject: Saint Petersburg
- Founded: 1704

Area
  - Total: 19.35 km^{2} (7.47 sq mi)

Population (2010 Census)
  - Total: 43,005
  - Estimate (2023): 44,414 (+3.3%)
  - Density: 2,222/km^{2} (5,756/sq mi)
- Time zone: UTC+
- Postal code: 197760–197762
- Dialing code: +7 812
- OKTMO ID: 40360000
- Website: www.gov.spb.ru/gov/admin/terr/reg_kronsht

Kronstadt (Russian: Кроншта́дт, romanized: Kronshtadt, IPA: [krɐnˈʂtat]) is a Russian port city in Kronshtadtsky District of the federal city of Saint Petersburg, located on Kotlin Island, 30 km (19 mi) west of Saint Petersburg, near the head of the Gulf of Finland. It is linked to the former Russian capital by a combination levee-causeway-seagate, the St Petersburg Dam, part of the city's flood defences, which also acts as road access to Kotlin island from the mainland.

Founded in the early 18th century by Peter the Great, it became an important international centre of commerce whose trade role was later eclipsed by its strategic significance as the primary maritime defence outpost of the former Russian capital. The main base of the Russian Baltic Fleet was located in Kronstadt, guarding the approaches to Saint Petersburg. The Kronstadt Fortress, a massive system of sea and land fortifications, served as the shield of the former Russian capital.

In March 1921, the island city was the site of the Kronstadt rebellion.

The historic centre of the city and its fortifications are part of the World Heritage Site that is Saint Petersburg and Related Groups of Monuments.

Kronstadt has been a place of pilgrimage for Orthodox Christians for many years due to the memory of Saint John of Kronstadt.

== Name ==
The name of the city is alternatively spelled as Kronshtadt, Cronstadt or Kronštadt. It is derived from German Kronstadt (lit. 'crown city'). The district is referred to as Kronshtadtsky District.

== History ==
=== Foundation ===
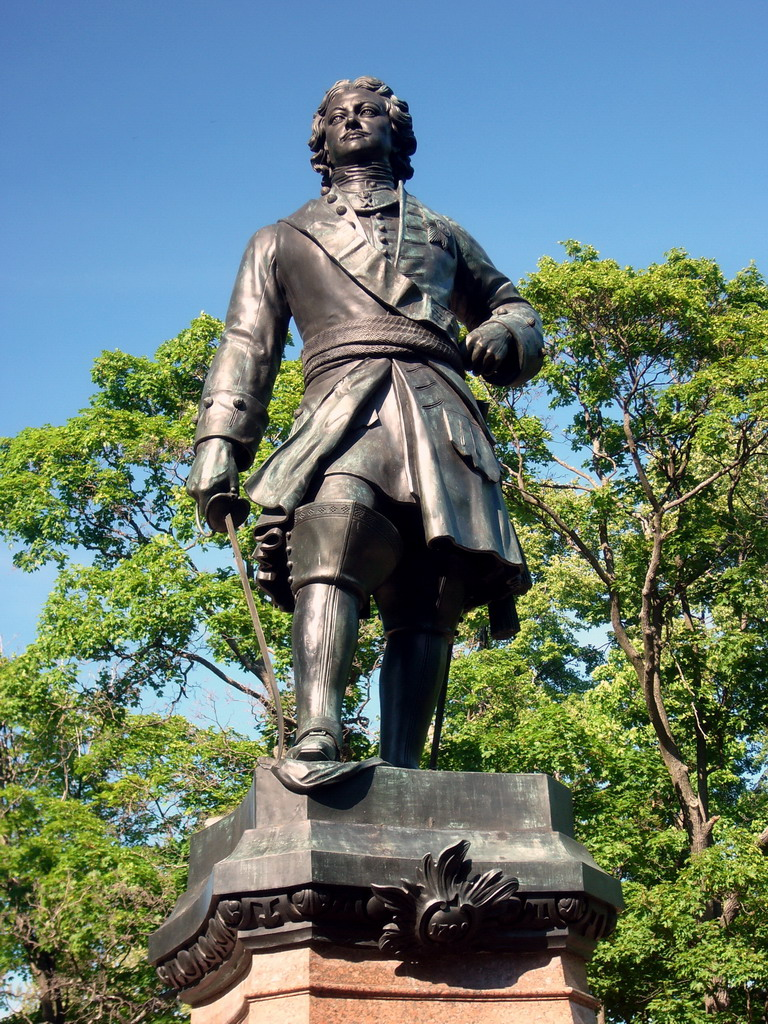
Monument to Peter the Great, the city's founder

Kotlin island with Kronstadt on Saint Petersburg administrative map

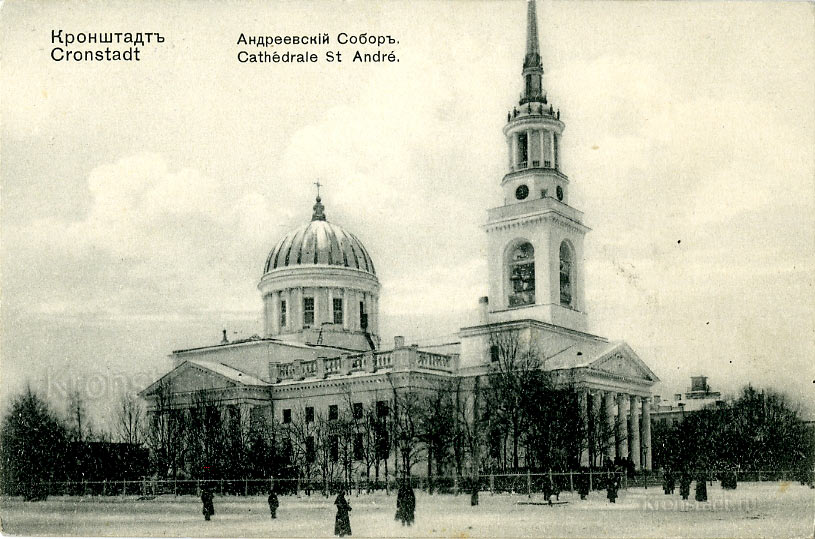
The Cathedral of St. Andrew (1817–1932), patron saint of the Russian Navy, destroyed by the Soviet regime in 1932.

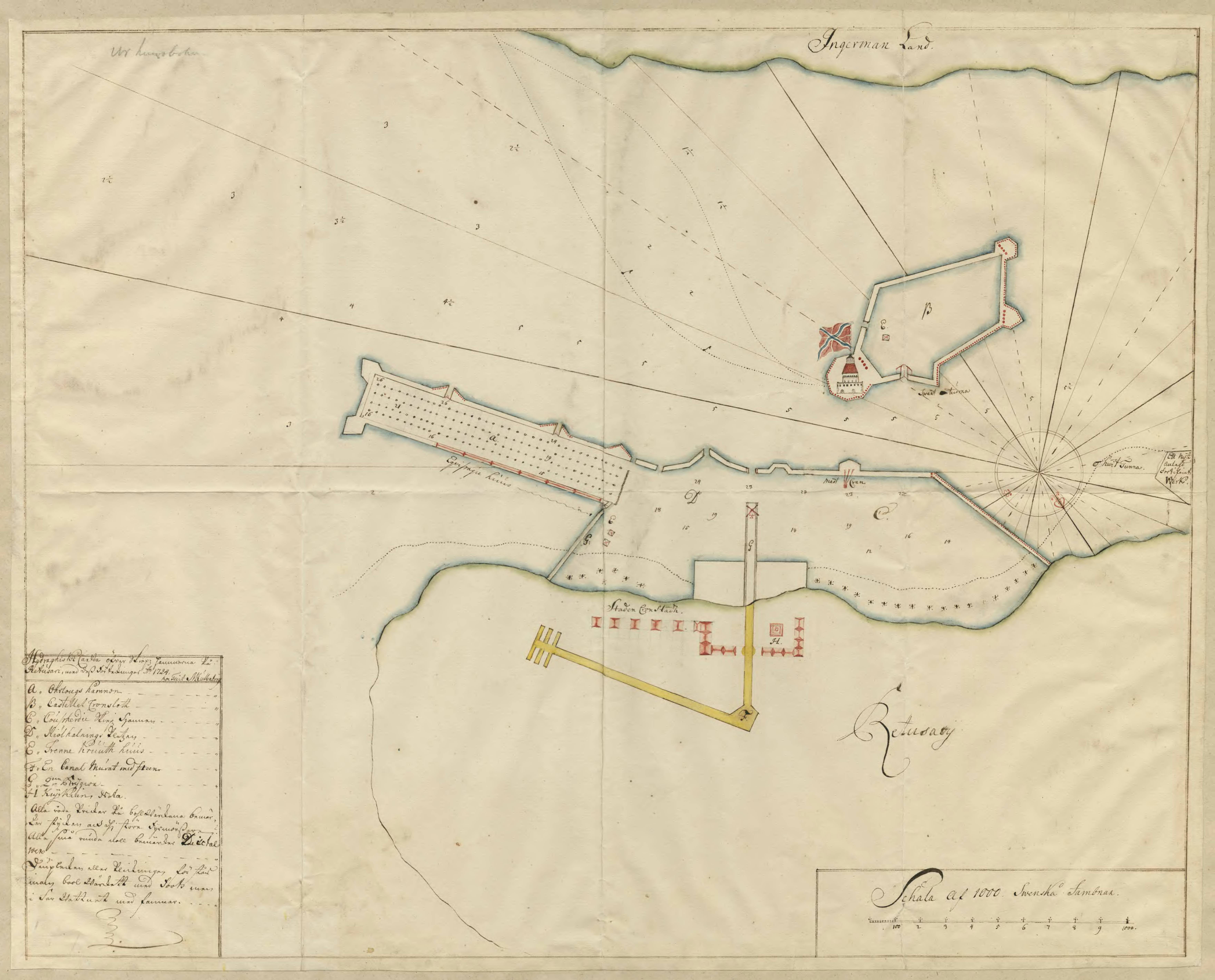
Map of the harbour and nearby fortifications of Kronstadt, 1724

Kronstadt was founded by Peter the Great, whose Imperial Russian forces took the island of Kotlin from the Swedes during the Great Northern War in 1703. The first fortifications were inaugurated on 18 May [O.S. 7 May] 1704. These fortifications, known as Kronshlot (Кроншлот), were constructed very quickly. During the winter, the Gulf of Finland freezes over completely. Under the command of Governor-general Alexander Danilovich Menshikov, workers used thousands of frames (caissons) made of logs from evergreen trees filled with stones which were moved by horses across the frozen sea, and placed in cuttings made in the ice. Thus, several new small islands were created, and forts were erected on them, virtually closing access to Saint-Petersburg by sea. Only two narrow navigable channels remained, with forts guarding them. On 8 July 1704, the fortress was attacked by a Swedish fleet led by Jacob de Prou.

One of the first governors of Kronstadt was a veteran of the Royal Scots Navy, Admiral Thomas Gordon who was a refugee in Russia from the Scottish union with England and became chief commander of the port of Kronstadt from 1727 to 1741.

Just as Kronstadt became populated and fortified, it attracted merchants from maritime powers most notably, the Dutch, the British and the Germans through the old Hanse connections. The community of British merchants or "factors" came to be known as the English Factory, despite the fact that many of them were Scots. They settled both in Kronstadt and in St Petersburg itself and for a time dominated both inward and outward trade, especially in the reign of Catherine the Great. They became an integral part of British trade and foreign policy through the Board of Trade in London. A number of the British settlers became naturalised Russians. The population by the 1840s was 44,000. Trading alliances were sharply interrupted by the outbreak of the Crimean War (1854).

Kronstadt was thoroughly refortified in the 19th century. The old three-decker forts, five in number, which formerly constituted the principal defences and had resisted the Anglo-French fleets during the Crimean War, became of secondary importance. From the plans of Eduard Totleben a new fort, Fort Constantine, and four batteries were constructed (1856–1871) to defend the principal approach, and seven batteries to cover the shallower northern channel. All these fortifications were low and thickly armoured earthworks with heavy Krupp guns on their ramparts. The city is surrounded by an enceinte.

In summer 1891, the French fleet was officially received in Kronstadt. It was a first step towards the forthcoming Franco-Russian Alliance.

=== Russian Civil War ===
During the Petrograd (now Saint Petersburg) riots of the February Revolution, the sailors of Petrograd joined the revolution and executed their officers, thus gaining a reputation as dedicated revolutionaries. After the October Revolution, the sailors allied with the Bolsheviks. They would remain supporters of the Bolsheviks until 1921.

Kronstadt with its supporting forts and minefields was key in protecting Petrograd from foreign forces. Despite this, the cruiser Oleg was torpedoed and sunk by a small motor boat after participating in the bombardment of Krasnaya Gorka fort that had revolted against the Bolsheviks. (Note: Ingrian nationalists, according to Operation Kronstadt) This was followed on August 18, 1919, by a raid of seven Royal Navy Coastal Motor Boats inside the harbour of Kronstadt itself, damaging the Soviet battleships Petropavlovsk and Andrei Pervozvanny, and sinking a submarine supply ship, the Pamiat Azova.

=== Kronstadt Rebellion ===
In 1921, a group of naval officers and men, together with soldiers and civilian supporters, rebelled against the Bolshevik government in Soviet Kronstadt. The garrison had previously been a centre of major support for the Bolsheviks, and throughout the Civil War of 1917–1921, the naval forces at Kronstadt had been at the vanguard of the main Bolshevik attacks. Their demands included freedom of speech, the end of deportation to work camps, a change in Soviet war politics, and liberation of the soviets (workers' councils) from "party control". After brief negotiations, Leon Trotsky (then the Minister of War in the Soviet Government, and the leader of the Red Army) responded by sending the army to Kronstadt, along with the Cheka. The uprising was thus suppressed following a massacre.

=== Interwar and World War II ===
In the late 1930s, the fortified city became the base of the Soviet Baltic Fleet. During that time it was an important training centre for the Soviet navy. The Kronstadt naval dockyard overhauled and repaired surface ships and submarines for the Baltic Fleet. All forts and batteries of the city were reconstructed.

At 23:37 on June 21, 1941, fleet operational readiness Number 1 was announced by Baltic Fleet Commander Vice Admiral Vladimir Tributs on the order of the People's Commissar of the Navy Admiral N.G. Kuznetsov. Several hours later the first German aircraft began dropping mines into the canal outside Kronstadt. The duty officer, first lieutenant S. Kushnerev, ordered anti-aircraft batteries to open fire on enemy planes. Several aircraft were shot down or damaged. Twenty-seven German planes took part in the first attack, and three were destroyed by the anti-aircraft guns of the 1st Air Defence Regiment of the Baltic Fleet. This regiment was situated in the southern forts.

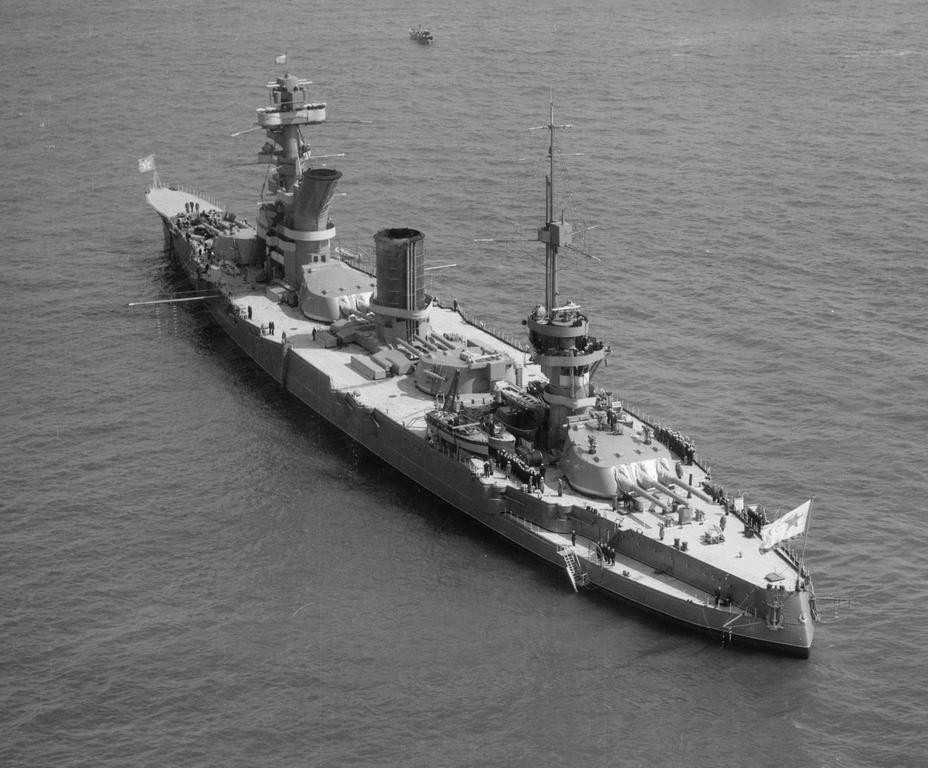
Soviet battleship Marat at the Spithead Fleet Review 1937

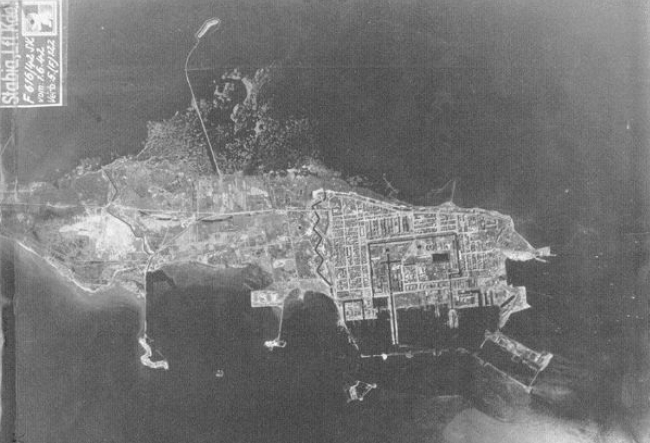
German aerial reconnaissance shot of Kronstadt, June 1, 1942

During World War II, Kronstadt was subject to several bombing raids by the Luftwaffe. In August 1941 the Luftwaffe began bombing Kronstadt repeatedly. The most notable bombing was Stuka ace Hans-Ulrich Rudel's sinking of the battleship Marat.

To prevent an enemy landing, 13 artillery batteries were established in Kronstadt with nine more batteries outside the city, on the island of Kotlin. The main lookout was located in the Naval Cathedral. Visual range reached 45 km (28 mi). The coastal defence forces of Kronstadt included two infantry regiments.

In late August, the Red Army in the Baltic States was in a critical situation. Tallinn, the main base of the fleet, was in danger and an order to relocate the fleet from Tallinn to Kronstadt was given. By the time the Soviets had decided on a maritime evacuation of Tallinn, over 200 Soviet civilian and military vessels had been assembled in Tallinn harbour.

After the evacuation of Tallinn, a submarine subdivision had been organized in Kronstadt. By the end of 1941, 82 naval operations had taken place. Hitler was enraged, because Soviet submarines frequently disrupted military supplies of strategic materials from Sweden to Germany. The Germans tried to block the exit completely from the Gulf of Finland with anti-submarine nets and mines. Despite these efforts, the Soviet submariners continued to attack German ships. In 1942, 29 German vessels were sunk. Submarines cooperated with reconnaissance aircraft in searching for military targets.

Soviet submarines had broken through the mine barrages in the Gulf of Finland in 1942. To keep the Soviet submarine force away from Baltic shipping stronger efforts were planned. The minefields would be larger and in addition a double submarine net would be laid from Porkkala to Naissaar in Operation Walross. The blockade of the Gulf of Finland turned out to be 100% effective. But in 1944, when Finland signed a peace treaty with the Soviet Union, one of the conditions was that the Soviets could locate one naval base in Finland at Porkkala. Submarine warfare in the Baltic Sea reached its final stage after peace was reached with Finland.

The Baltic Fleet sent more than 125,000 people to serve on shore at the front. Eighty-three thousand people fought directly on the Leningrad Front. For the protection of Leningrad 10 brigades of naval infantry, four regiments, and more than 40 separate battalions and companies were formed in Kronstadt.

The Luftwaffe and German artillery sent thousands of bombs and shells onto the naval dockyard and the Arsenal factory. The German air raids in September 1941, damaged ships of the Baltic Fleet and the infrastructure of the naval dockyard. Several sections of the yard were destroyed, the docks were heavily bombed causing the death of dozens of workers and engineers. Nevertheless, the naval yard continued its work. Despite the siege, the workers persevered with their work, often working 18–20 hours a day.

Thanks to the power of the Kronstadt Fortress the destruction of Leningrad, then the main industrial and cultural centre of the Soviet Union, was successfully prevented. The honorary status of "City of Military Glory" was conferred on it by the President of the Russian Federation Dmitriy Medvedev on April 27, 2009, citing the "courage, endurance and mass heroism, exhibited by defenders of the city in the struggle for the freedom and independence of the Motherland".

== Population ==
With changing historical trends, the population saw peaks and troughs partly determined by the expansion and then decline of the naval base and dockyard.

Year	Inhabitants
1854	53,000
1897	59,525
1926	31,197
1939	38,071
1959	40,303
1970	39,477
1979	40,308
1989	45,053
2002	43,385
2010	43,005

Note Census data of 1897 includes military personnel

Recent population data indicate it has stabilised as follows: 43,385 (2002 census); 43,005 (2010 census).

== Places of interest ==
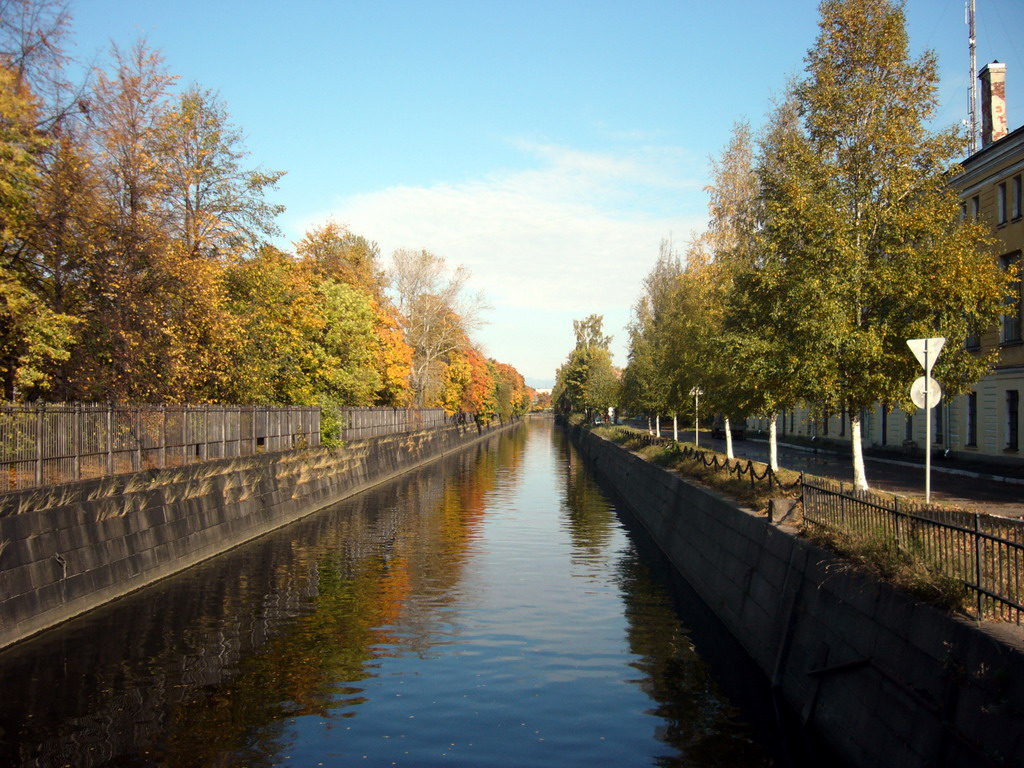
The Bypass canal

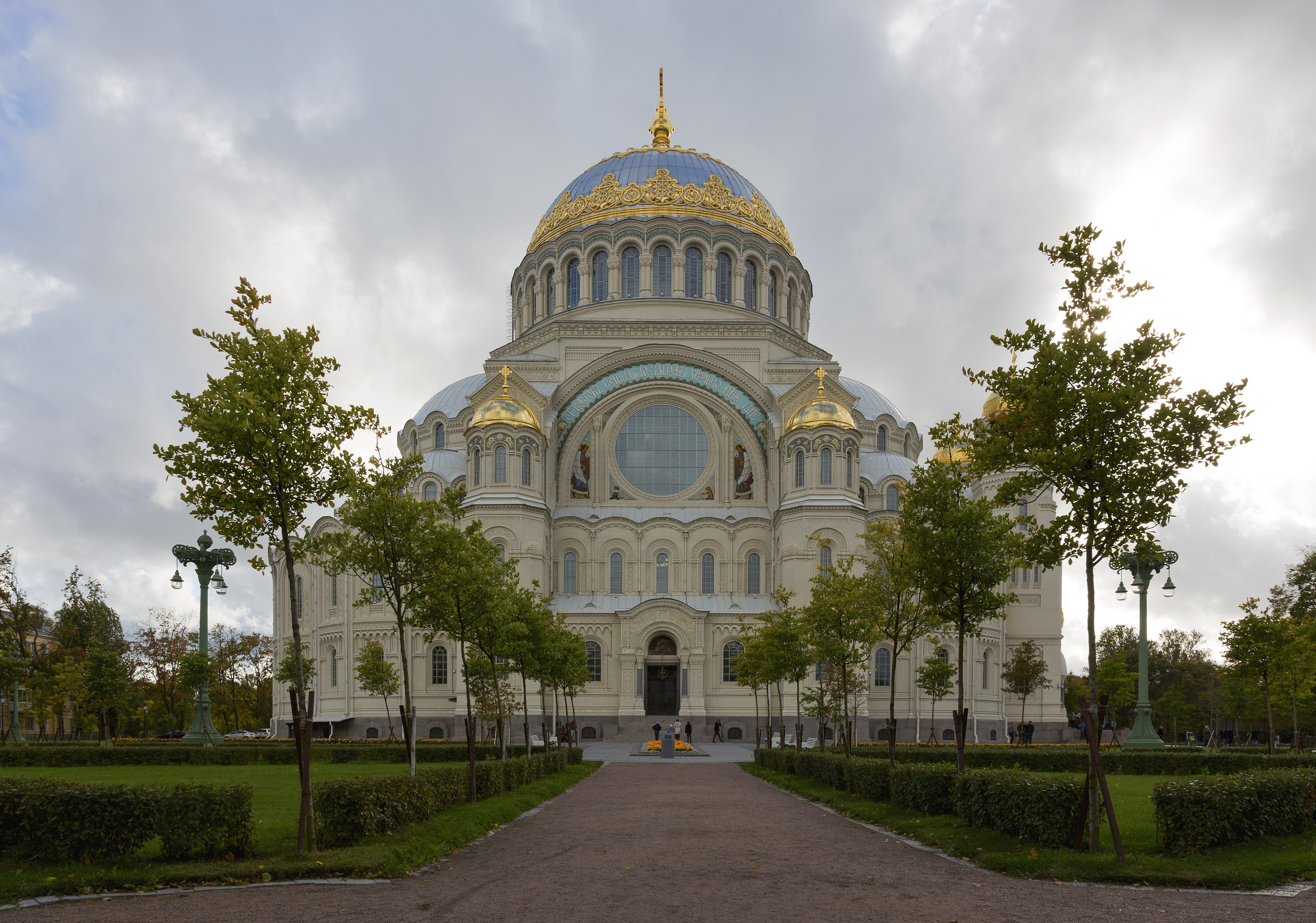
The Naval Cathedral in Kronstadt, exterior

The city of Kronstadt is built on level ground on the island and is thus exposed to flooding, most notably in 1824. The port is icebound for 140–160 days in the year, from the beginning of December to April. A very large proportion of the inhabitants are sailors. On the south side of the city there are three harbours: the large western or merchant harbour, the western flank of which is formed by a great pier joining the fortifications which traverse the breadth of the island on one side. The middle harbour was used chiefly for fitting out and repairing vessels. The eastern or military harbour was used for docking vessels of the Russian Navy. The Peter and Catherine Canals connected with the merchant and middle harbours across the city. Between them stood the old Italian Palace of Prince Menshikov, whose site was later occupied by a school for pilots. In the second half of the 18th century the building of the former Italian palace was used by various military training institutions. In 1771–1798 the Sea Cadet Corps was housed there before being transferred to St Petersburg. From 1798 to 1872 the Navigation School was situated in the former palace.

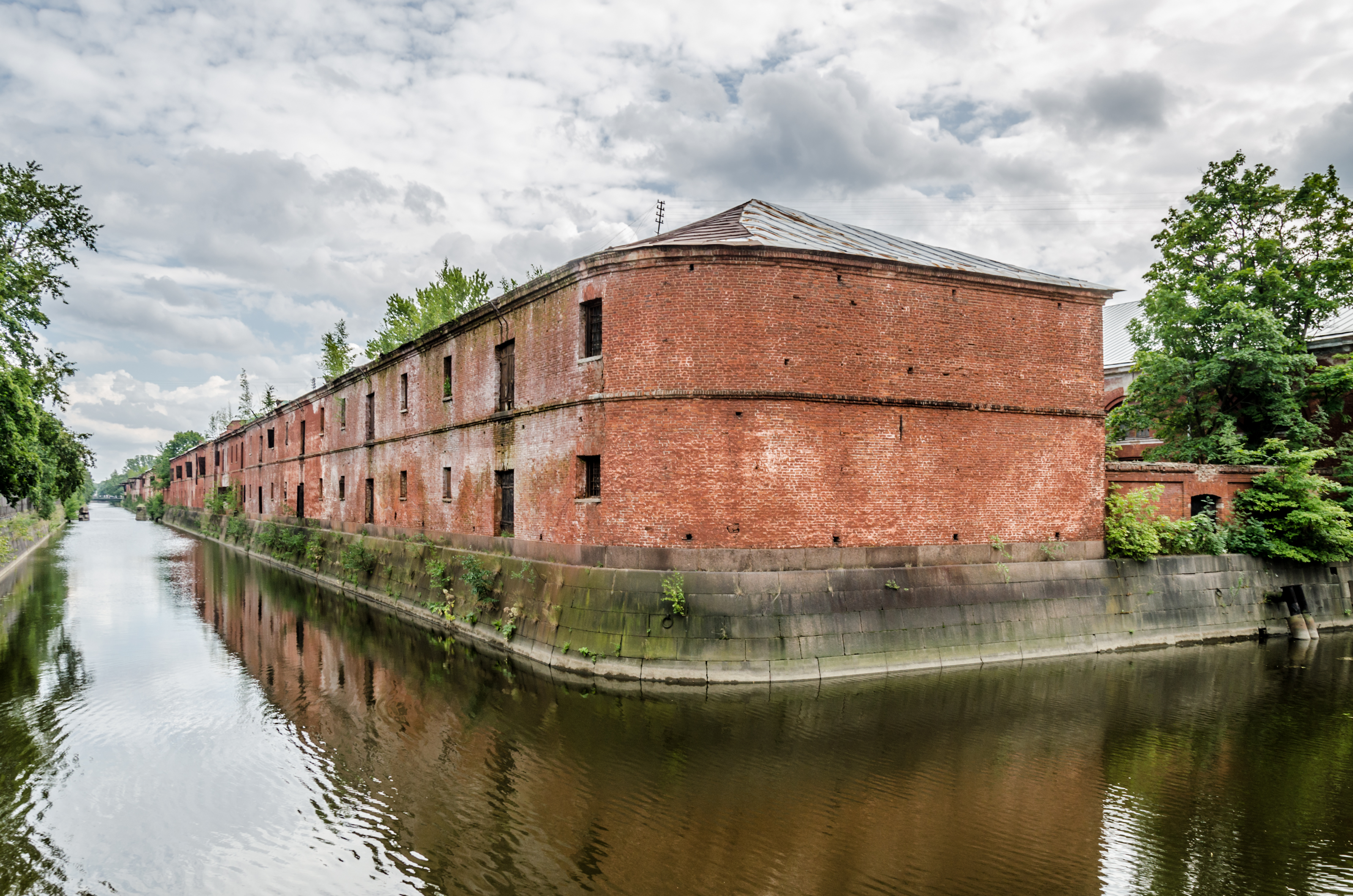
Warehouse

The Kronstadt tide gauge is situated near the former Italian palace. Sea level observations in Saint Petersburg began already in 1703. On Kotlin Island, the main naval fortress of the Russian Empire began observations in 1707. This monitoring was necessary because the water level of the Finnish Gulf could change considerably in a short time, creating problems for shipping. The annual flood also required close monitoring of the water level. The Kronstadt sea-gauge with the tide gauge pavilion is the zero level of the Baltic system of highs and lows. All depths and altitudes (even the heights of spacecraft) in Russia and some other countries of the former Russian Empire are measured according to the Kronstadt sea-gauge. Yuri Gagarin, the first man in space, said in 1967 that it was "the Hub of the Universe".

The modern city's most striking landmark is considered to be the enormous Naval Cathedral, dedicated to St Nicholas and built between 1908 and 1913 in Anchor Square which also contains many military memorials. The cathedral is regarded as the culmination of Russian Neo-Byzantine architecture. The Pyotrovsky Gardens is a park that surrounds the monument to Peter the Great who founded the city. There are a number of historic buildings, such as the Dutch Kitchen and the former Italian Palace, that recall the city's mercantile and military past.

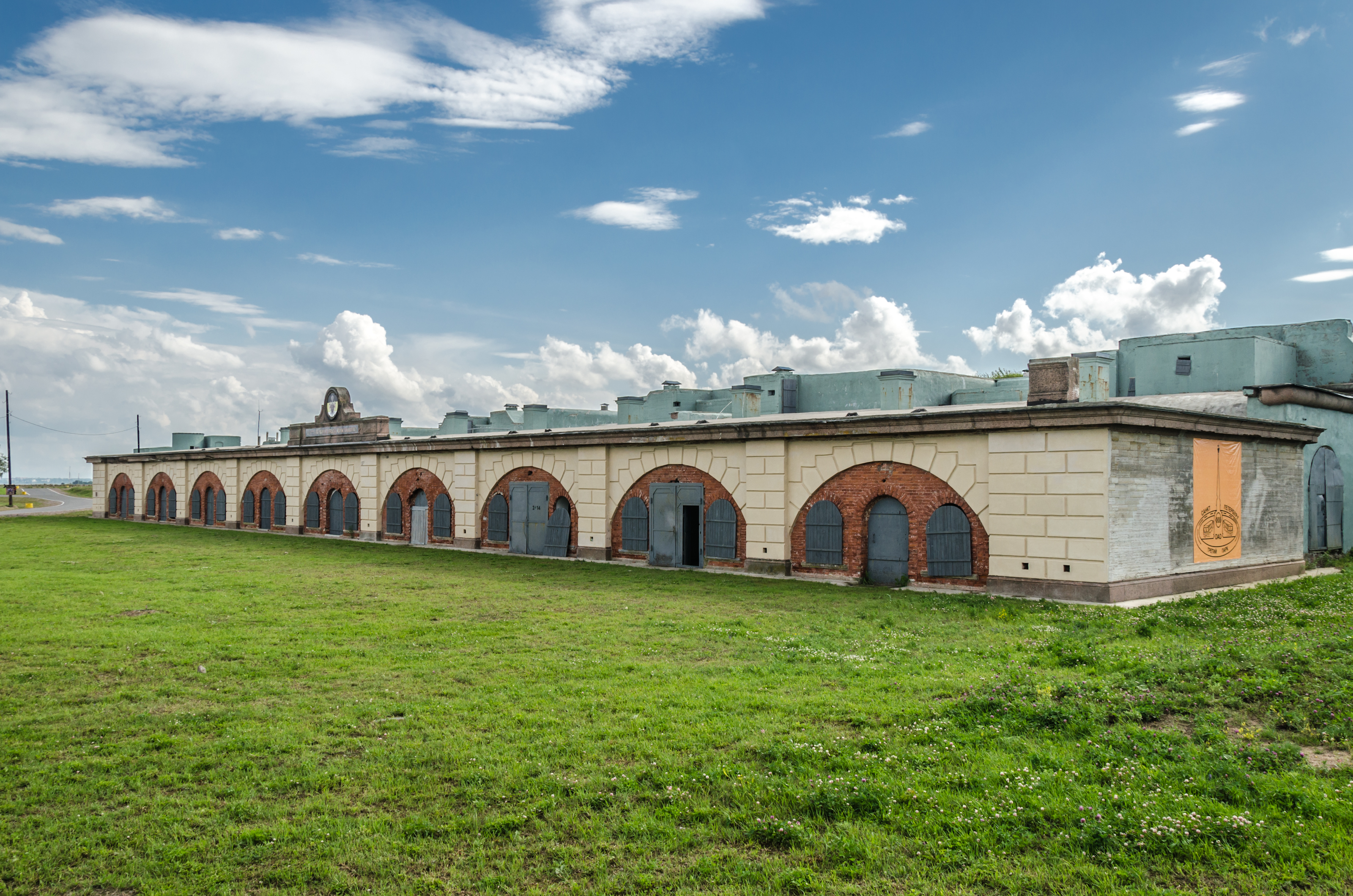
Fort Konstantin

Among other public buildings are the Naval Hospital, the British Seamen's Hospital (established in 1867), the Civic Hospital, the Admiralty (founded in 1785), the arsenal, dockyards and foundries, the School of Marine Engineering, and the English Church.

The Kronstadt port was once considered the most fortified port in the world. It still retains some of its old "forts" on small fortified artificial islands. Originally, there were 22 such forts, situated in line with the southern and northern shores of the Gulf of Finland. Some fortifications were located inside the city itself and one was on the western shore of Kronslot Island, on the other side of the main navigational channel.

The construction of the Saint Petersburg Dam led to some of the forts being demolished. The dam, a levee-causeway-Seagate combination also enabled Kronstadt and some of the forts being reached by land. Among the most important surviving forts are:

- Fort Konstantin, the biggest in the Gulf of Finland
- Fort Rif on the western shore of the island; and the particularly well-preserved Fort Alexander I, "the Plague Fort"
- Fort Totleben, named after Eduard Totleben, the largest and the newest of the forts, built at the beginning of the 20th century.

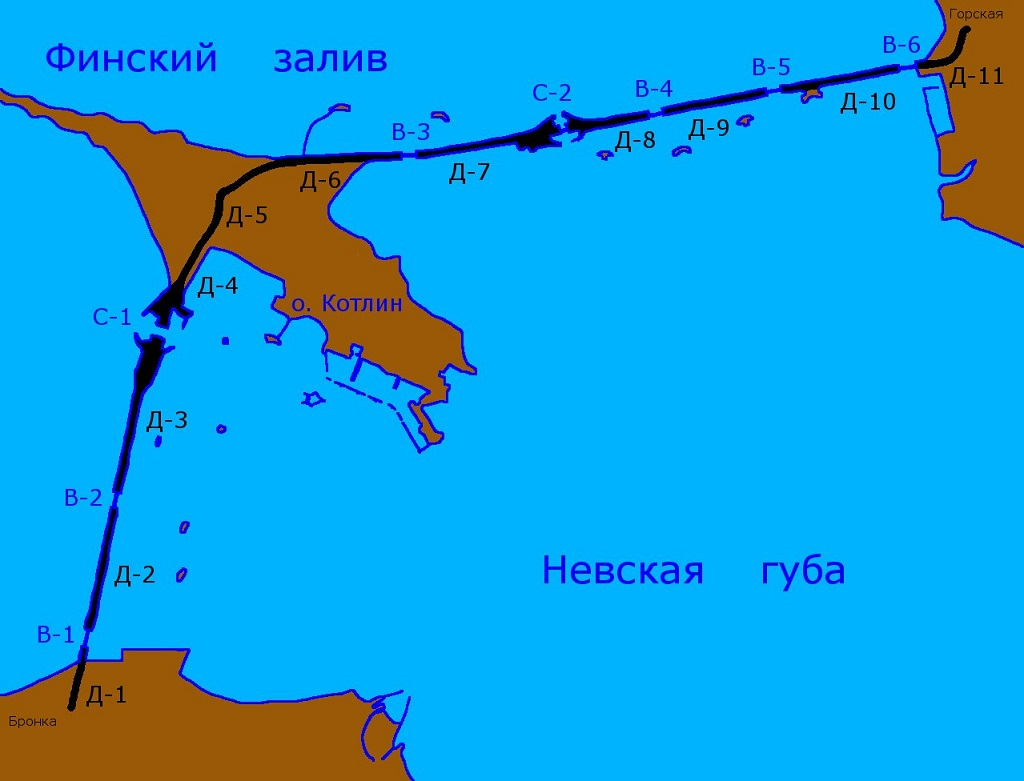
Plan of the St Petersburg Dam

There are daily bus and water tours to Kronstadt from Saint Petersburg.

=== Devotion to St. John of Kronstadt ===
The now demolished older St Andrew Cathedral (1817), once a prominent Kronstadt landmark, was destroyed on Communist orders in 1932. St John of Kronstadt, one of the most venerated Russian saints, served there as priest from 1855 to 1908.

=== Saint Petersburg Dam ===
The controversial dam that took 30 years to build (1980–2011) now links Kotlin island to the mainland from north and south, not only acts as part of the flood defences, but lets through shipping and completes the St Petersburg ring-road system, across the island. It is a feat of marine engineering consisting of a combination of levee-causeway and seagate. Its construction on the shoals of the Gulf of Finland involved the removal of some of the historic fortifications.

== Twin towns – sister cities ==
Kronstadt is twinned with:

- Asipovichy, Belarus
- Changli County, China
- Dax, France
- Demre, Turkey
- Feodosia, Ukraine (Note: Disputed territory as at March 2024, due to the Russo-Ukrainian War)
- Ii, Finland
- Kotka, Finland
- Lushan City, China
- Marostica, Italy
- Messina, Italy
- Mühlhausen, Germany
- Nafplio, Greece
- Narva-Jõesuu, Estonia
- Nordborg (Sønderborg), Denmark
- Oulu, Finland
- Oxelösund, Sweden
- Pinghu, China
- Põhja-Tallinn (Tallinn), Estonia
- Pudasjärvi, Finland
- Sumoto, Japan
- Toulon, France
- Zhongshan County, China

=== Former twin towns ===
- Piła, Poland

On 1 March 2022, the Polish city of Piła suspended its partnership with Kronstadt as a reaction to the 2022 Russian invasion of Ukraine.

== Notable people ==
- Agustín de Betancourt (1758–1824), Spanish engineer and town planner of Kronstadt
- Mikhail Britnev (1822–1889), shipbuilder
- Alexei Ivanovich Butakov (1816–1869), Admiral and explorer, brother of Admiral Grigory Butakov
- Hippolyte de Capellis (1744–1813), French naval officer, emigrant after the French Revolution, became a rear admiral of the Imperial Navy and governor of Kronstadt (1799–1801)
- Nikolay Dubinin (1907–1998), geneticist
- Alexander Gomelsky (1928–2005), basketball player and coach
- Thomas Gordon (1658 -1741), admiral, governor, and commander-in-chief at Kronstadt from 1727 until his death in 1741. His granddaughter Anne Young married a Scot, Lt. Thomas MacKenzie (Foma Kalinovich Mekenzi, Фома Калинович Мекензи, son of Colin). Two years after their marriage in 1738 they had a son also called Thomas, (Foma Fomich Mekenzi (Фома Фомич Мекензи), son of Thomas), a Scottish-Russian rear admiral who founded the city of Sevastopol in the service of the Russian Empire in 1783.
- Aleksey Greig (1775–1845), Admiral of the Imperial Russian Navy, son of Samuel Greig, a Scottish admiral in the service of Russia
- Nikolay Gumilyov (1886–1921), influential poet and founder of Acmeist poetry, murdered by the Cheka
- Pyotr Kapitsa (1894–1984), co-recipient of the 1978 Nobel Prize in Physics, born in Kronstadt
- Nikolai Kulchitsky (1856–1925), histologist
- Svetlana Medvedeva (born 1965), Russian economist and former First Lady of Russia
- Otto Friedrich Theodor von Möller (1812–1874), painter of German descent
- Cleo Nordi (1898–1983), Russo-Finnish ballerina, born in Kronstadt. She later taught in London
- Stepan Petrichenko (1892–1947), leader of the Kronstadt Mutiny (1921)
- Eino Rahja (1885–1936), Finnish-Russian Communist revolutionary; brother of Jukka Rahja
- Jukka Rahja (1887–1920), Finnish-Russian Communist revolutionary, born in the city; brother of Eino Rahja
- Sergei Revyakin (born 1995), Russian football goalkeeper
- Saint John of Kronstadt (1829–1909), Kronstadt parish priest, revered as a saint after his death
- Mikhail von Schulz (1862–1917), Vice-admiral of the Russian Imperial Navy
- Pyotr Sobennikov (1894–1960), Soviet lieutenant general
- Boris Stark (1909–1996), missionary and priest
- Thomas Tooke (1774–1858), British economist and statistician, born in Kronstadt; son of William Tooke
- William Tooke (1744–1820), chaplain (1772–75) to the English merchant community in Kronstadt, later moved to St. Petersburg; father of Thomas Tooke
- Domenico Trezzini (1670–1734), Swiss-Italian architect who worked on first design of Kronstadt
- Ivan Yendogurov (1861–1898), painter
- Ivan Yevdokimov (1887–1941), writer

== Gallery ==
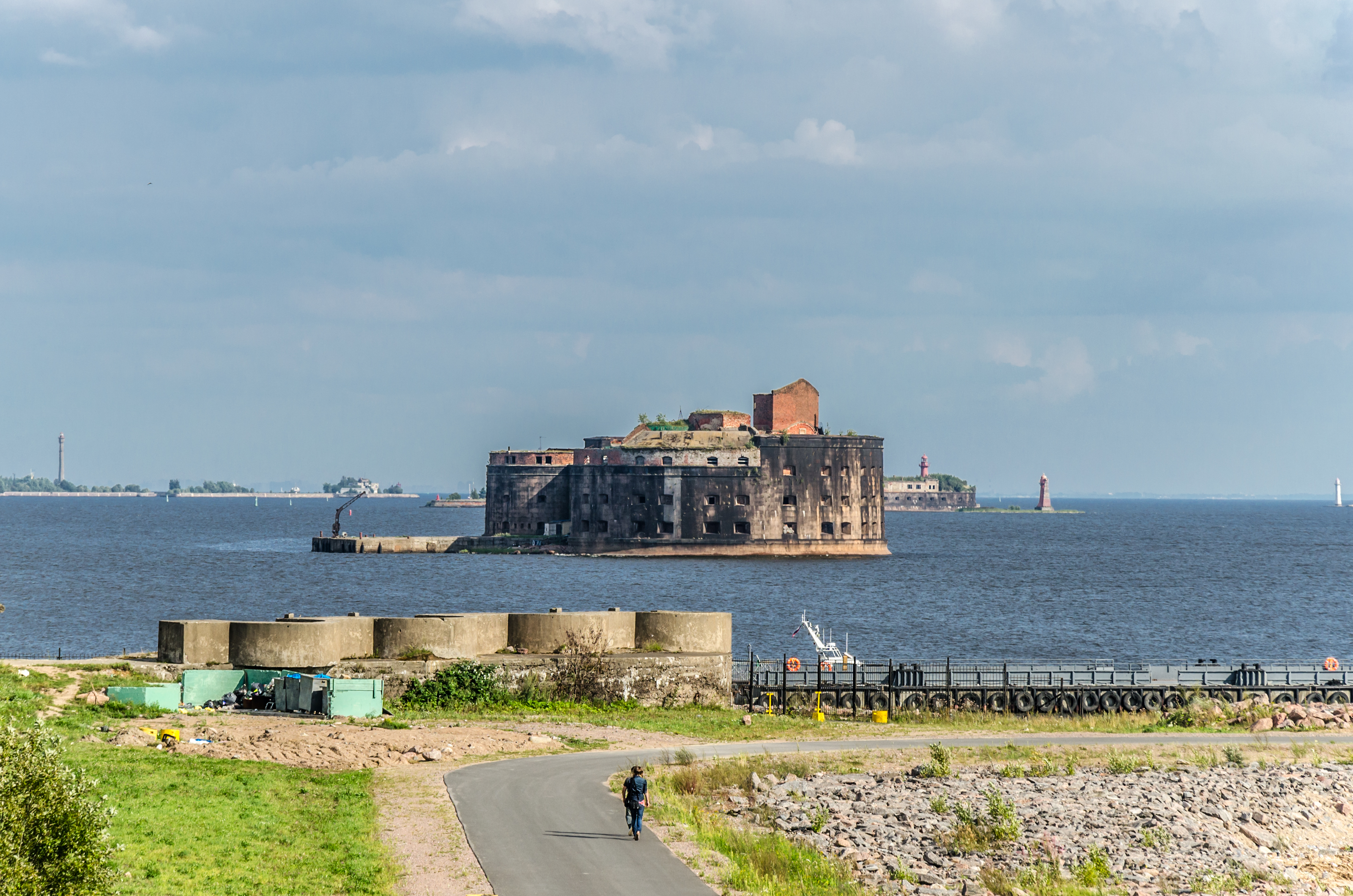
Fort Alexander viewed from Kronstadt

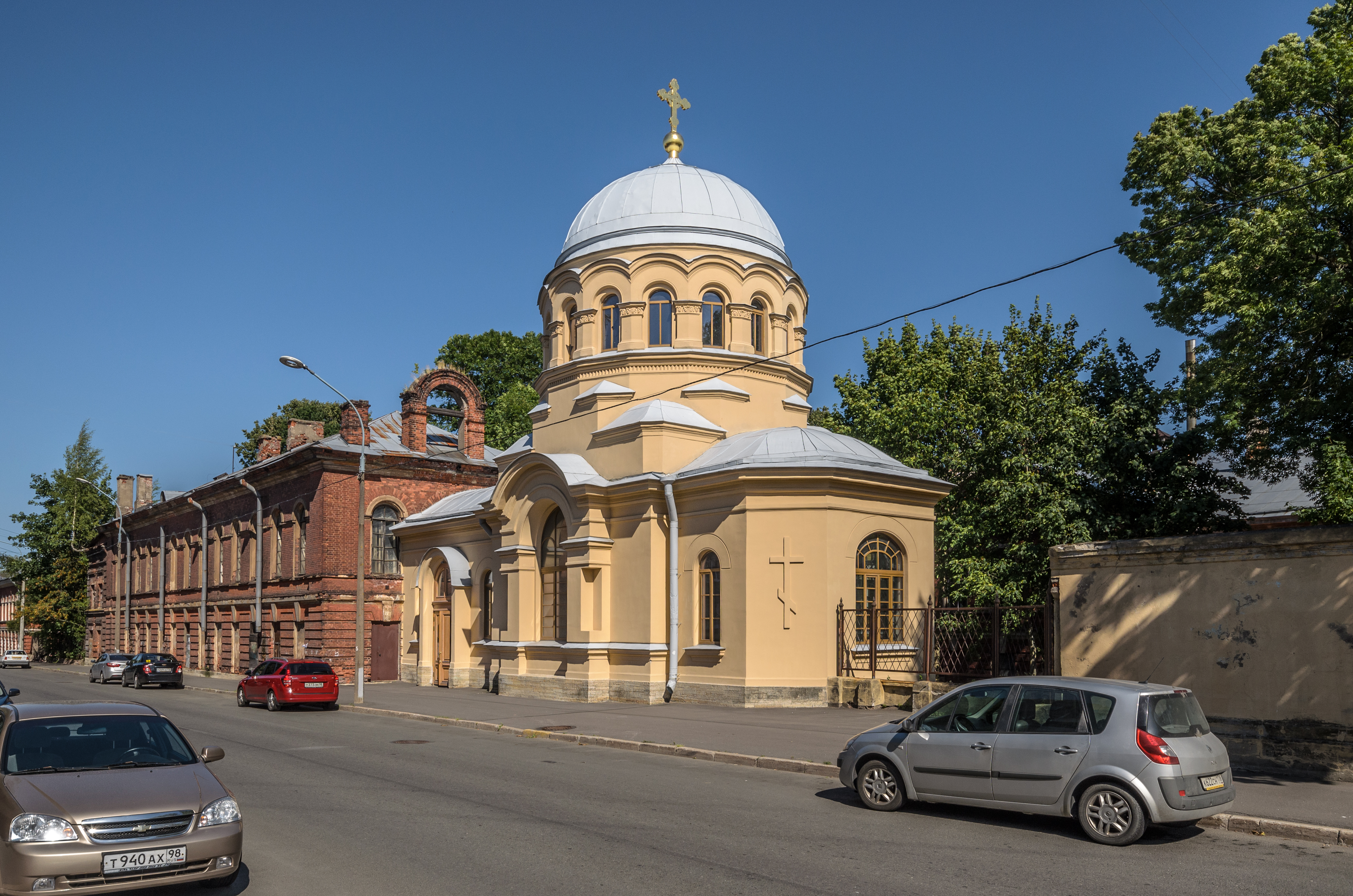
St Nicolas Chapel

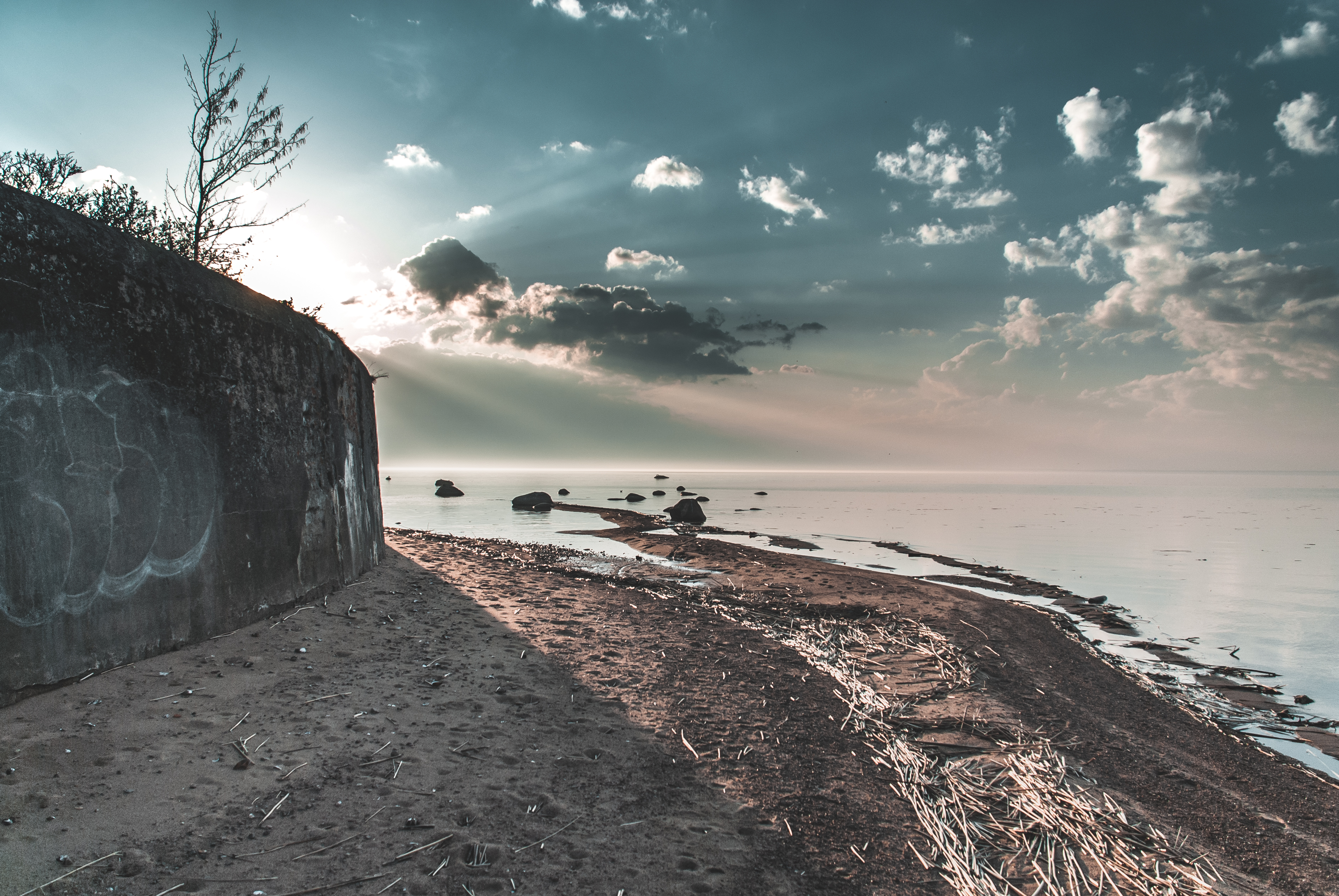
Fort Rif

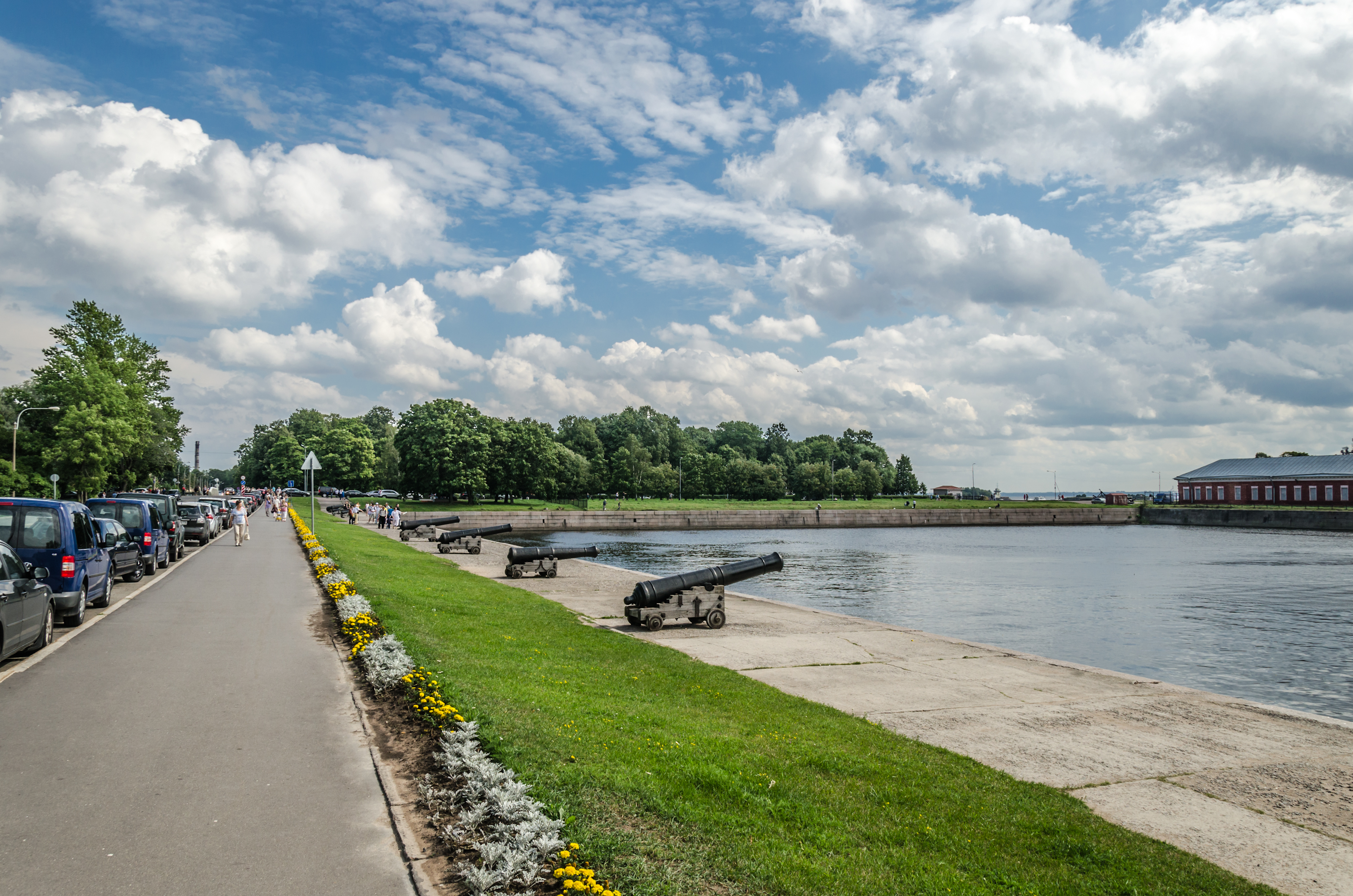
Italian pond

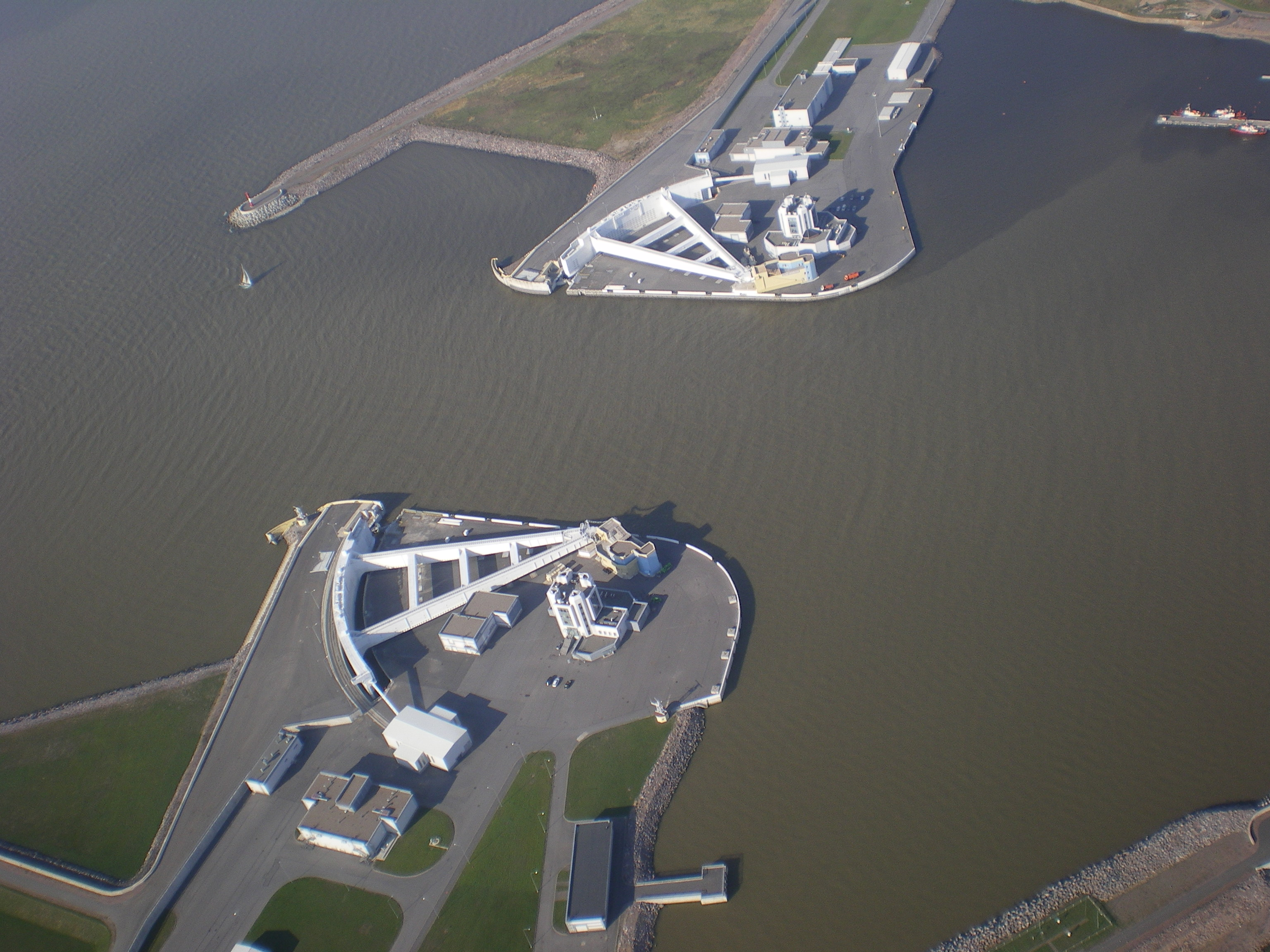
Aerial view of Navigation Pass S-1 of Saint Petersburg Dam

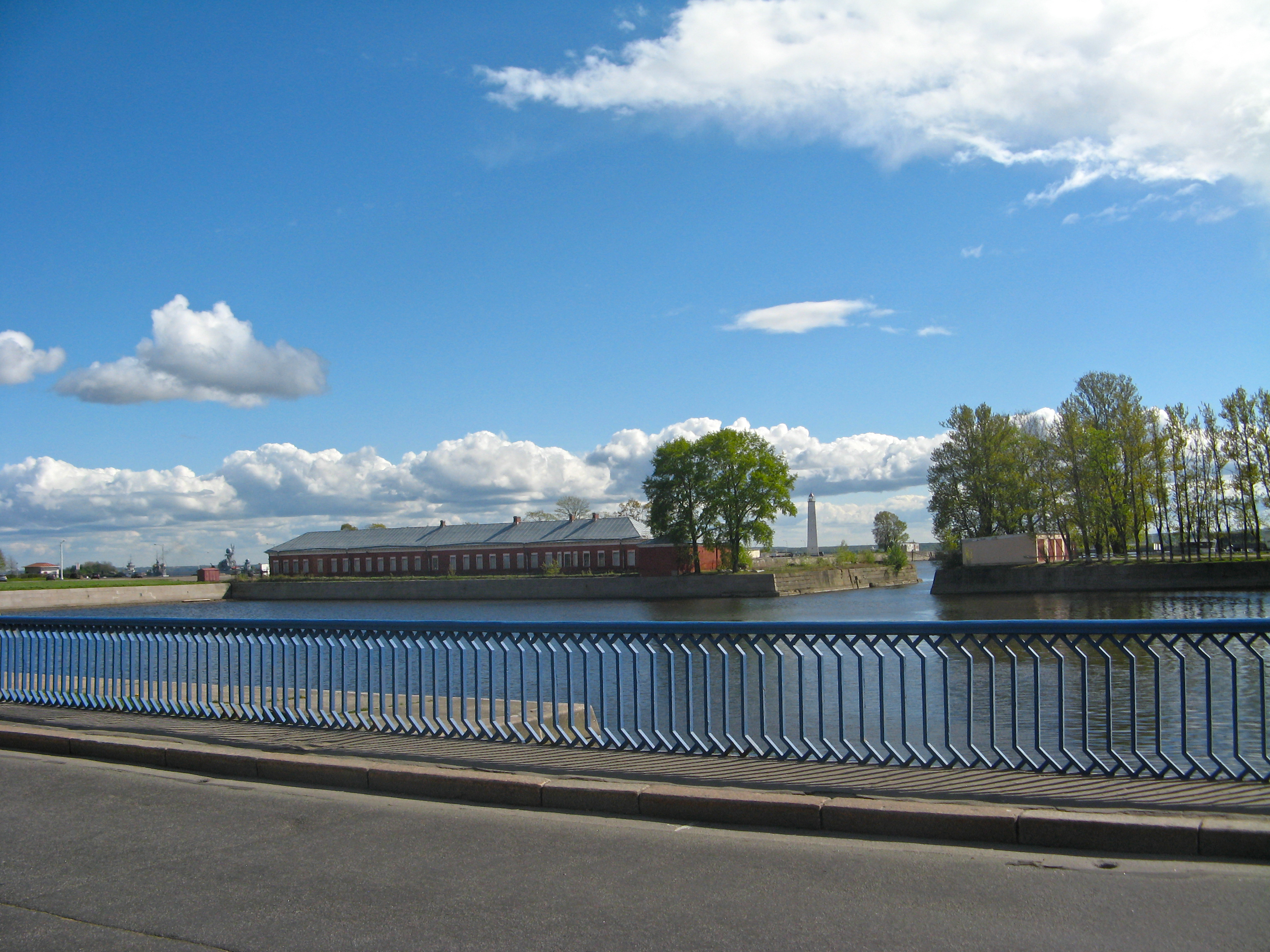
Kronstadt the Blue bridge

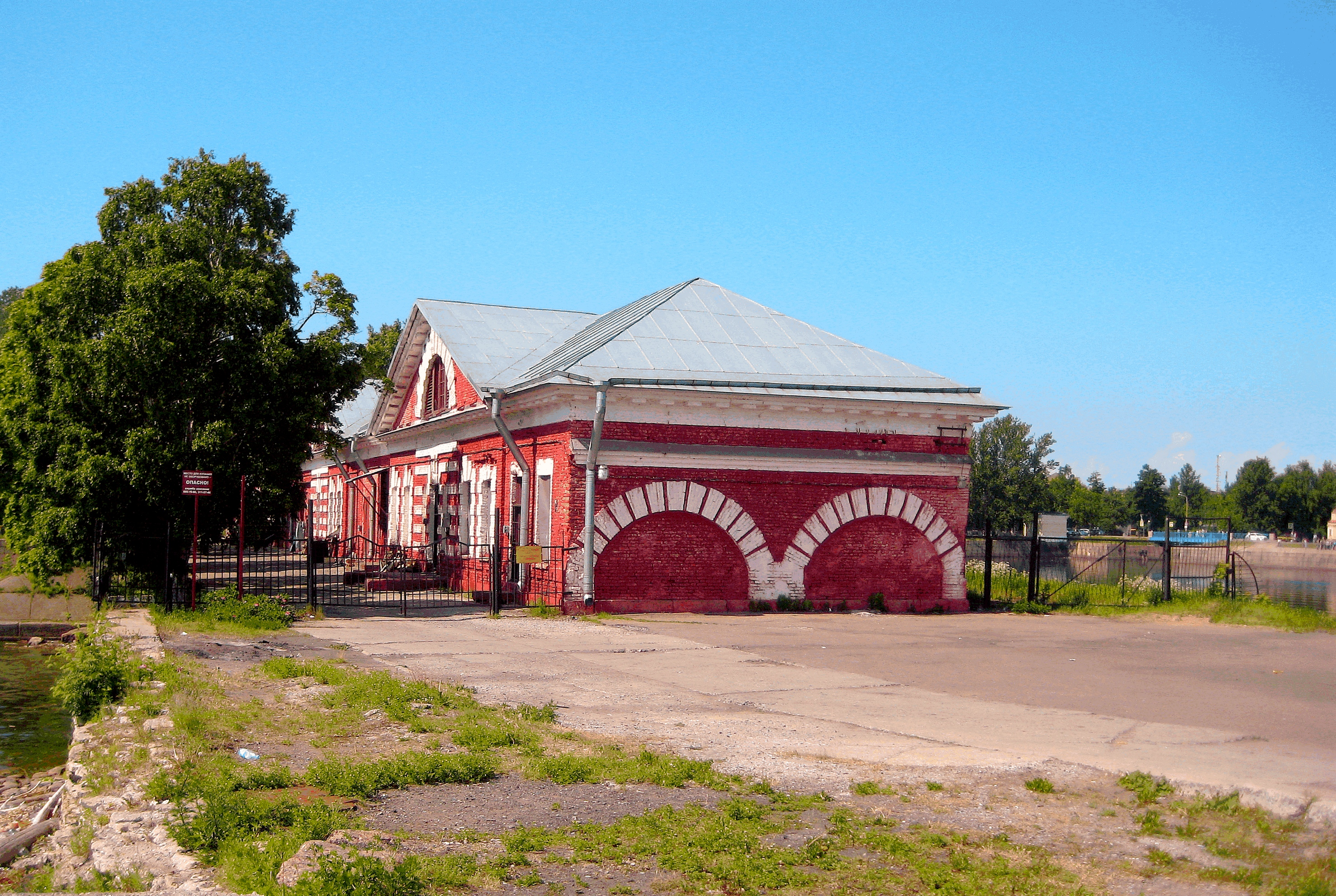
The Dutch Kitchen, Kronstadt

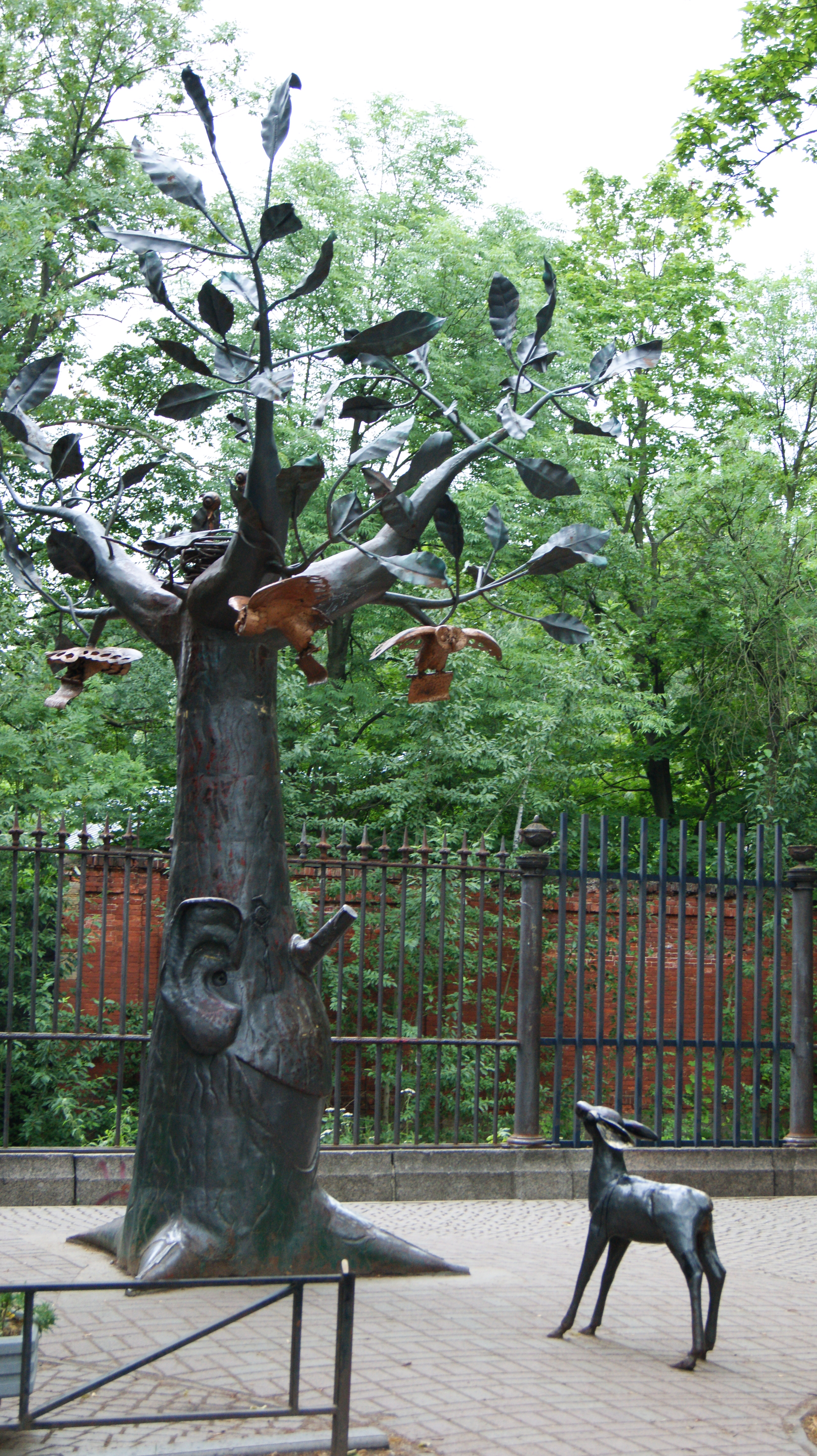
Kronstadt street art

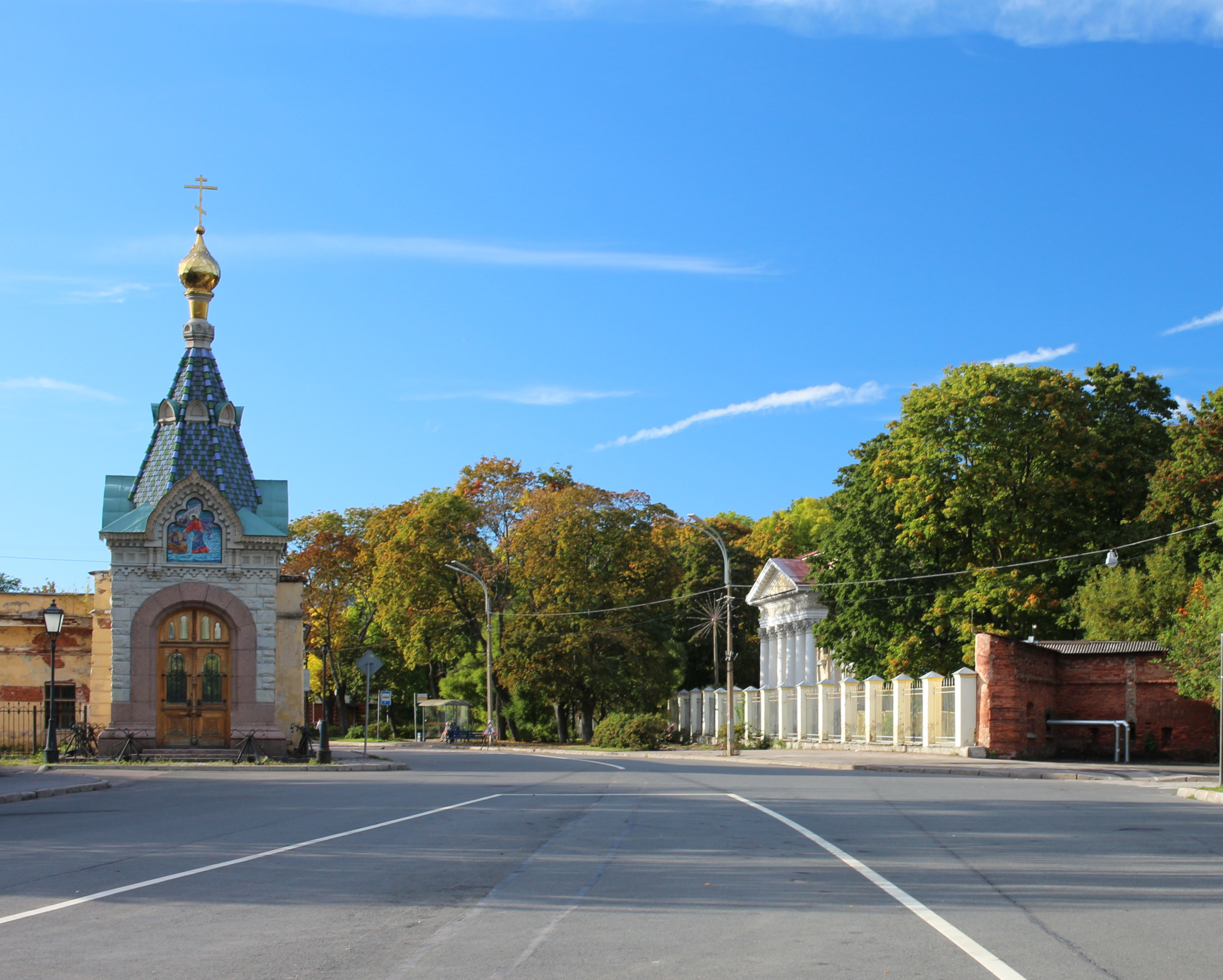
Leningradskaya Street

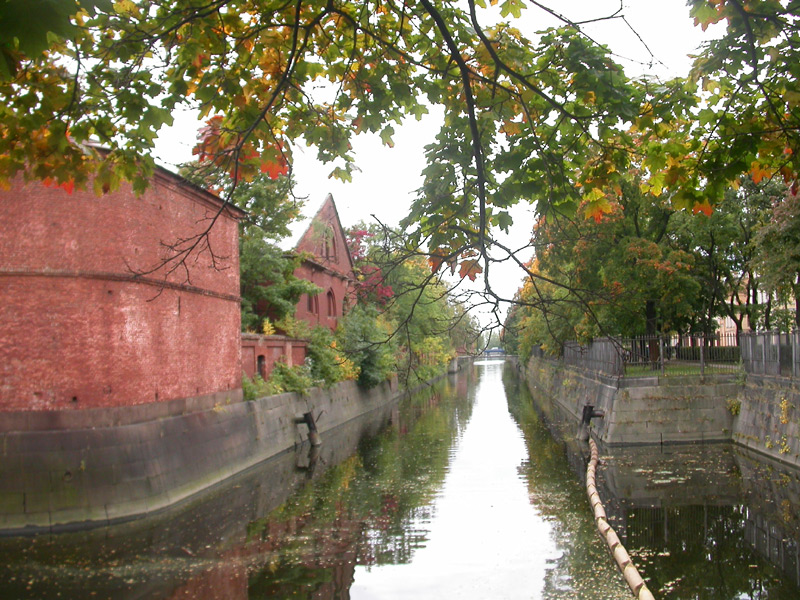
A Kronstadt canal

== Works cited ==
- Wolke, Lars Ericson [in Swedish] (2025). Mot Sankt Petersburg! Den karolinska arméns desperata kamp 1708 [Towards Saint Petersburg! The Desperate Struggle of the Carolean Army in 1708] (in Swedish). Carlssons.
