= Abashevo, Penza Oblast =

Coordinates: 53°52′N 43°20′E

Abashevo is a village in Penza Oblast, Russia.
