= Boris Stark =

Russian theologian (1909–1996)

Boris Georgevich Stark (1909-1996) was a Russian missionary and priest.

== Biography ==
Boris Georgevich Stark was born on 15 July 1909 in Kronstadt, Russia. His father was admiral Georgy Karlovich Stark, commander of the Siberian fleet, who emigrated to France in 1922. Boris joined his father in Paris in 1925, when he was sixteen years old. He continued his education in France, graduating as electrical engineer from the Technical Institute in Paris. During his student years he was active in the Russian Students' Christian Movement (РСХД) and he abandoned his engineering career, studying theology and specializing in missionary studies.

In 1929 he married Natalya Dmitrievna Abasheva. In 1937 he was consecrated deacon and thereafter priest and worked at the Saint Nicholas Church of Sainte-Geneviève-des-Bois near Paris.

In 1952 Boris Stark returned to Russia. He first worked as priest in Kostroma, where he also was secretary of the eparchial council. He then was appointed professor at the Odessa seminary. In 1960 he was transferred to the Yaroslavl diocese, covering the cities of Rybinsk and Yaroslavl. He was elevated to the rank of mitrophoros (mitrate) protoiereus.

Boris Stark died in Yaroslavl on 11 January 1996.
