= Vladimir Abashev =

Russian philologist and academic

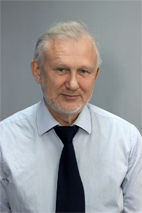
- Abashev in 2014
- Born: April 21, 1954 (age 72); Perm Krai, Russia
- Education: Perm State University
- Occupations: Philologist, Professor: Philological Faculty (B.A., 1978)
- Employer: Perm State University

Vladimir Vasilevich Abashev (Russian: Владимир Васильевич Абашев; born 21 April 1954) is a Russian philologist from Perm Krai and a professor of Perm State University.

In 1978 he graduated from the Philological Faculty of Perm State University and since 1987 he has been working in the university in the department of Russian literature. From 1991 to 1996 he was head of the department. In 1995 he helped established the Russian Literature Research Laboratory, one of the largest centers for the study of the cultural life of Russian provinces.
