= Bolshoye Selo, Yaroslavl Oblast =

Bolshoye Selo Большое Село
- Selo
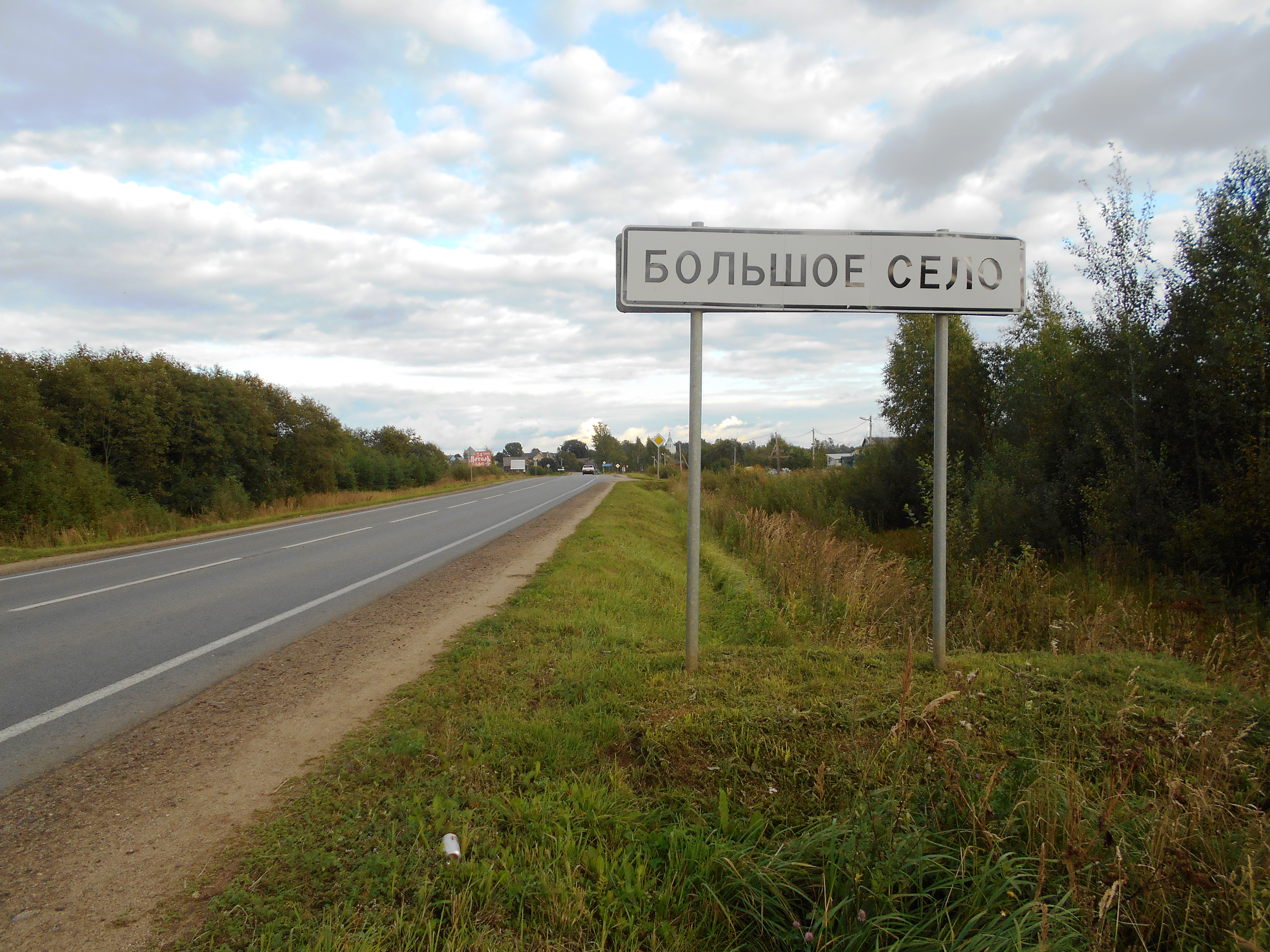
- Interactive map of Bolshoye Selo
- Location of Bolshoye Selo Bolshoye Selo (Yaroslavl Oblast)
- Coordinates: 57°43′N 38°57′E
- Country: Russia
- Federal subject: Yaroslavl Oblast
- Administrative district: Bolsheselsky District
- Elevation: 137 m (449 ft)

Population (2010 Census)
  - Total: 3,522

Administrative status
  - Capital of: Bolsheselsky District
- Time zone: UTC+3 (MSK)
- Postal code: 152360
- OKTMO ID: 78603422101

Bolshoye Selo (Russian: Большо́е Село́) is a rural locality (a selo) and the administrative center of Bolsheselsky District of Yaroslavl Oblast, Russia. Population: 3,522 (2010 census); 3,721 (2002 census); 3,996 (1989 Soviet census).

== History ==
Bolshoye Selo was first mentioned in 1567 as belonging to the princely House of Mstislavl. In 1706, Peter the Great gave the property to Count Boris Sheremetev. The Shheremetev family owned the Yukhot volost until 1917. The church of St. Paraskevi was built in 1747 on the Yuhkot River.
