= Bolsheselsky District =

Bolsheselsky District Большесельский район (Russian)
- District
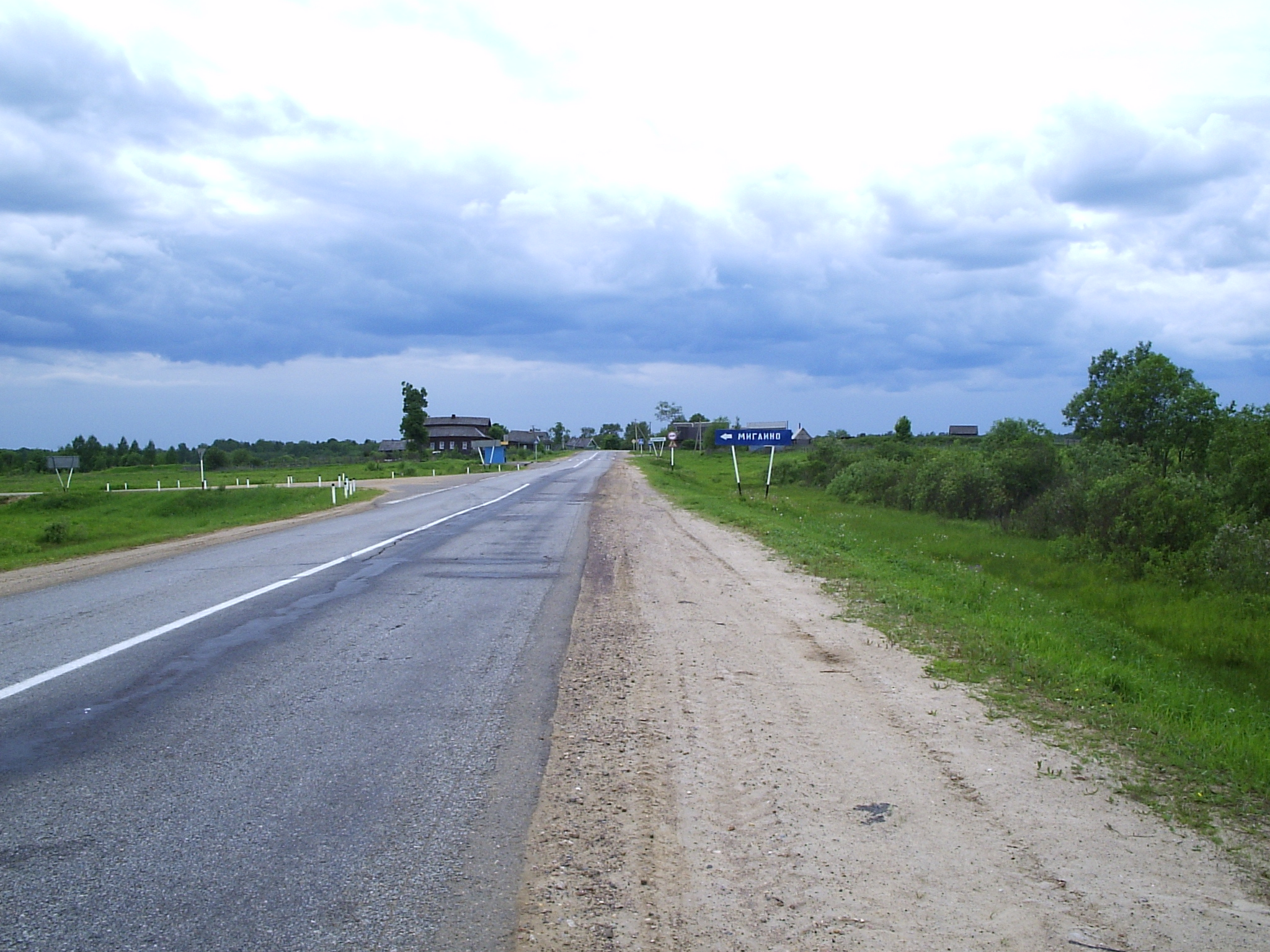
- The Yaroslavl–Uglich road near the village of Miglino in Bolsheselsky District

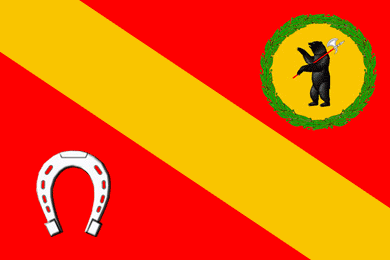
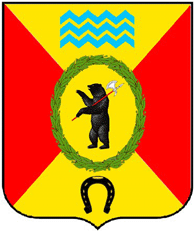
- Flag Coat of arms
- Location of Bolsheselsky District in Yaroslavl Oblast
- Coordinates: 57°43′24″N 38°56′38″E
- Country: Russia
- Federal subject: Yaroslavl Oblast
- Established: 25 January 1935
- Administrative center: Bolshoye Selo

Area
  - Total: 1,353 km^{2} (522 sq mi)

Population (2010 Census)
  - Total: 9,906
  - Estimate (2018): 9,234 (−6.8%)
  - Density: 7.322/km^{2} (18.96/sq mi)
  - Urban: 0%
  - Rural: 100%

Administrative structure
  - Administrative divisions: 7 Rural okrugs
  - Inhabited localities: 317 rural localities

Municipal structure
  - Municipally incorporated as: Bolsheselsky Municipal District
  - Municipal divisions: 0 urban settlements, 3 rural settlements
- Time zone: UTC+3 (MSK)
- OKTMO ID: 78603000
- Website: http://xn----8sbbqashcehc4ack1ajc5j5cf.xn--p1ai/

Bolsheselsky District (Russian: Большесе́льский райо́н) is an administrative and municipal district (raion), one of the seventeen in Yaroslavl Oblast, Russia. It is located in the center of the oblast. The area of the district is 1,353 square kilometers (522 sq mi). Its administrative center is the rural locality (a selo) of Bolshoye Selo. Population: 9,906 (2010 Census); 10,703 (2002 census); 13,053 (1989 Soviet census). The population of Bolshoye Selo accounts for 35.6% of the district's total population.
