= Obukhovo =

Obukhovo (Russian: Обухово) is the name of several inhabited localities in Russia.

== Ivanovo Oblast ==
As of 2010, one rural locality in Ivanovo Oblast bears this name:

- Obukhovo, Ivanovo Oblast, a village in Verkhnelandekhovsky District

== Kaliningrad Oblast ==
As of 2010, one rural locality in Kaliningrad Oblast bears this name:

- Obukhovo, Kaliningrad Oblast, a settlement in Kovrovsky Rural Okrug of Zelenogradsky District

== Kaluga Oblast ==
As of 2010, four rural localities in Kaluga Oblast bear this name:

- Obukhovo (Dvortsy Rural Settlement), Dzerzhinsky District, Kaluga Oblast, a village in Dzerzhinsky District; municipally, a part of Dvortsy Rural Settlement of that district
- Obukhovo (Ugorskaya Rural Settlement), Dzerzhinsky District, Kaluga Oblast, a village in Dzerzhinsky District; municipally, a part of Ugorskaya Rural Settlement of that district
- Obukhovo, Medynsky District, Kaluga Oblast, a village in Medynsky District
- Obukhovo, Ulyanovsky District, Kaluga Oblast, a village in Ulyanovsky District

== Kirov Oblast ==
As of 2010, one rural locality in Kirov Oblast bears this name:

- Obukhovo, Kirov Oblast, a selo in Obukhovsky Rural Okrug of Pizhansky District

== Kostroma Oblast ==
As of 2010, two rural localities in Kostroma Oblast bear this name:

- Obukhovo, Buysky District, Kostroma Oblast, a village in Tsentralnoye Settlement of Buysky District
- Obukhovo, Vokhomsky District, Kostroma Oblast, a village in Belkovskoye Settlement of Vokhomsky District

== Kurgan Oblast ==
As of 2010, one rural locality in Kurgan Oblast bears this name:

- Obukhovo, Kurgan Oblast, a selo in Obukhovsky Selsoviet of Pritobolny District

== Leningrad Oblast ==
As of 2010, one rural locality in Leningrad Oblast bears this name:

- Obukhovo, Leningrad Oblast, a village in Staroladozhskoye Settlement Municipal Formation of Volkhovsky District

== Moscow Oblast ==
As of 2010, six inhabited localities in Moscow Oblast bear this name:

Urban localities

- Obukhovo, Noginsky District, Moscow Oblast, a work settlement in Noginsky District

Rural localities

- Obukhovo, Naro-Fominsky District, Moscow Oblast, a village in Tashirovskoye Rural Settlement of Naro-Fominsky District
- Obukhovo, Ramensky District, Moscow Oblast, a village in Gzhelskoye Rural Settlement of Ramensky District
- Obukhovo, Shakhovskoy District, Moscow Oblast, a village in Stepankovskoye Rural Settlement of Shakhovskoy District
- Obukhovo, Shatursky District, Moscow Oblast, a village in Radovitskoye Rural Settlement of Shatursky District
- Obukhovo, Solnechnogorsky District, Moscow Oblast, a village in Krivtsovskoye Rural Settlement of Solnechnogorsky District

== Nizhny Novgorod Oblast ==
As of 2010, two rural localities in Nizhny Novgorod Oblast bear this name:

- Obukhovo, Gorodetsky District, Nizhny Novgorod Oblast, a village in Zinyakovsky Selsoviet of Gorodetsky District
- Obukhovo, Pervomaysky District, Nizhny Novgorod Oblast, a selo in Petrovsky Selsoviet of Pervomaysky District

== Orenburg Oblast ==
As of 2010, one rural locality in Orenburg Oblast bears this name:

- Obukhovo, Orenburg Oblast, a settlement in Krasnogvardeysky Selsoviet of Buzuluksky District

== Perm Krai ==
As of 2010, one rural locality in Perm Krai bears this name:

- Obukhovo, Perm Krai, a village in Kungursky District

== Pskov Oblast ==
As of 2010, one rural locality in Pskov Oblast bears this name:

- Obukhovo, Pskov Oblast, a village in Nevelsky District

== Ryazan Oblast ==
As of 2010, one rural locality in Ryazan Oblast bears this name:

- Obukhovo, Ryazan Oblast, a village in Podbolotyevsky Rural Okrug of Pitelinsky District

== Smolensk Oblast ==
As of 2010, three rural localities in Smolensk Oblast bear this name:

- Obukhovo, Pochinkovsky District, Smolensk Oblast, a village in Muryginskoye Rural Settlement of Pochinkovsky District
- Obukhovo, Safonovsky District, Smolensk Oblast, a village in Vadinskoye Rural Settlement of Safonovsky District
- Obukhovo, Vyazemsky District, Smolensk Oblast, a village in Meshcherskoye Rural Settlement of Vyazemsky District

== Republic of Tatarstan ==
As of 2010, one rural locality in the Republic of Tatarstan bears this name:

- Obukhovo, Republic of Tatarstan, a village in Laishevsky District

== Tula Oblast ==
As of 2010, one rural locality in Tula Oblast bears this name:

- Obukhovo, Tula Oblast, a village in Solopensky Rural Okrug of Aleksinsky District

== Tver Oblast ==
As of 2010, seven rural localities in Tver Oblast bear this name:

- Obukhovo, Belsky District, Tver Oblast, a village in Belsky District
- Obukhovo, Kalininsky District, Tver Oblast, a village in Kalininsky District
- Obukhovo, Konakovsky District, Tver Oblast, a village in Konakovsky District
- Obukhovo, Spirovsky District, Tver Oblast, a village in Spirovsky District
- Obukhovo (Maslovskoye Rural Settlement), Torzhoksky District, Tver Oblast, a village in Torzhoksky District; municipally, a part of Maslovskoye Rural Settlement of that district
- Obukhovo (Ladyinskoye Rural Settlement), Torzhoksky District, Tver Oblast, a village in Torzhoksky District; municipally, a part of Ladyinskoye Rural Settlement of that district
- Obukhovo, Zharkovsky District, Tver Oblast, a village in Zharkovsky District

== Vladimir Oblast ==
As of 2010, one rural locality in Vladimir Oblast bears this name:

- Obukhovo, Vladimir Oblast, a village in Kolchuginsky District

== Vologda Oblast ==
As of 2010, six rural localities in Vologda Oblast bear this name:

- Obukhovo, Gryazovetsky District, Vologda Oblast, a village in Lezhsky Selsoviet of Gryazovetsky District
- Obukhovo, Sheksninsky District, Vologda Oblast, a village in Nifantovsky Selsoviet of Sheksninsky District
- Obukhovo, Ustyuzhensky District, Vologda Oblast, a village in Ustyuzhensky Selsoviet of Ustyuzhensky District
- Obukhovo, Kubenskoye Rural Settlement, Vologodsky District, Vologda Oblast, a village in Kubenskoye Rural Settlement of Vologodsky District
- Obukhovo, Nesvoysky Selsoviet, Vologodsky District, Vologda Oblast, a village in Nesvoysky Selsoviet of Vologodsky District
- Obukhovo, Semyonkovskoye Rural Settlement, Vologodsky District, Vologda Oblast, a village in Semenkovsky Selsoviet of Vologodsky District
- Obukhovo, Staroselskoye Rural Settlement, Vologodsky District, Vologda Oblast, a village in Staroselsky Selsoviet of Vologodsky District

== Yaroslavl Oblast ==
As of 2010, six rural localities in Yaroslavl Oblast bear this name:

- Obukhovo, Breytovsky District, Yaroslavl Oblast, a village in Ulyanovsky Rural Okrug of Breytovsky District
- Obukhovo, Nekouzsky District, Yaroslavl Oblast, a village in Vereteysky Rural Okrug of Nekouzsky District
- Obukhovo, Pervomaysky District, Yaroslavl Oblast, a village in Kozsky Rural Okrug of Pervomaysky District
- Obukhovo, Kamennikovsky Rural Okrug, Rybinsky District, Yaroslavl Oblast, a village in Kamennikovsky Rural Okrug of Rybinsky District
- Obukhovo, Pogorelsky Rural Okrug, Rybinsky District, Yaroslavl Oblast, a village in Pogorelsky Rural Okrug of Rybinsky District
- Obukhovo, Yaroslavsky District, Yaroslavl Oblast, a village in Glebovsky Rural Okrug of Yaroslavsky District
