= Obukhov =

Obukhov (masculine) or Obukhova (feminine) may refer to:

- Obukhov (surname) (or Obukhova), Russian last name
- Obukhov Defense, a labour revolt in 1901
- Obukhov (inhabited locality) (or Obukhova), several rural localities in Russia
- 9914 Obukhova, a main belt asteroid

== See also ==
- Obukhiv, a city in Ukraine
- Obukhovo, several rural localities in Russia
- Obukhovsky (disambiguation)
