= Obukhovsky =

Obukhovsky (masculine), Obukhovskaya (feminine), or Obukhovskoye (neuter) may refer to:

- Obukhovsky (surname) (fem. Obukhovskaya), Russian last name
- Obukhovsky (inhabited locality) (Obukhovskaya, Obukhovskoye), several inhabited localities in Russia
- Obukhovsky Bridge, a bridge across the Fontanka River in St. Petersburg, Russia
- Obukhovsky Municipal Okrug, a municipal okrug in Nevsky District of the federal city of St. Petersburg, Russia
- Obukhov State Plant (Obukhovsky zavod), a major Russian metallurgy and heavy machine-building plant in St. Petersburg, Russia
- Obukhovsky 12"/52 Pattern 1907 gun, a Russian and Soviet naval gun

== See also ==
- Bolshoy Obukhovsky Bridge, a bridge across the Neva River in St. Petersburg, Russia
