= Abukhovich =

Abukhovich (Russian: Абухо́вич) is a Russian last name; a variant of Obukhov.

People with this last name

- Philip Abukhovich, Voivode of Smolensk described in The Unknown War military history book by Hienadz Sahanovich
