= The Unknown War =

The title The Unknown War may refer to:

- The Unknown War (book), a 1995 military history book written by Hienadz Sahanovich
- The Unknown War (documentary), a 1978 US documentary hosted by Burt Lancaster
