= A118 =

A118 or A-118 may refer to:

- A118 road in London, England
- Saint Petersburg Ring Road in Russia, designated as Russian Federal Highway A-118
