= Obukhovsky (inhabited locality) =

Obukhovsky (Russian: Обуховский; masculine), Obukhovskaya (Обуховская; feminine), or Obukhovskoye (Обуховское; neuter) is the name of several inhabited localities in Russia.

== Modern localities ==
- Obukhovsky, Astrakhan Oblast (or Obukhovskoye), a settlement in Karaulinsky Selsoviet of Kamyzyaksky District in Astrakhan Oblast; 45°50′N 48°10′E
- Obukhovskoye (rural locality), a selo in Obukhovsky Selsoviet of Kamyshlovsky District in Sverdlovsk Oblast
- Obukhovskaya, a village in Verkhovsky Selsoviet of Tarnogsky District in Vologda Oblast

== Alternative names ==
- Obukhovsky, alternative name of Obukhovo, a work settlement in Noginsky District of Moscow Oblast; 55°50′N 38°17′E
- Obukhovskoye, alternative name of Obukhovo, a selo in Obukhovsky Selsoviet of Pritobolny District in Kurgan Oblast; 55°5′N 65°24′E
