= Western High-Speed Diameter =

Road in Russia

- Western High-Speed Diameter; Западный скоростной диаметр (ЗСД)
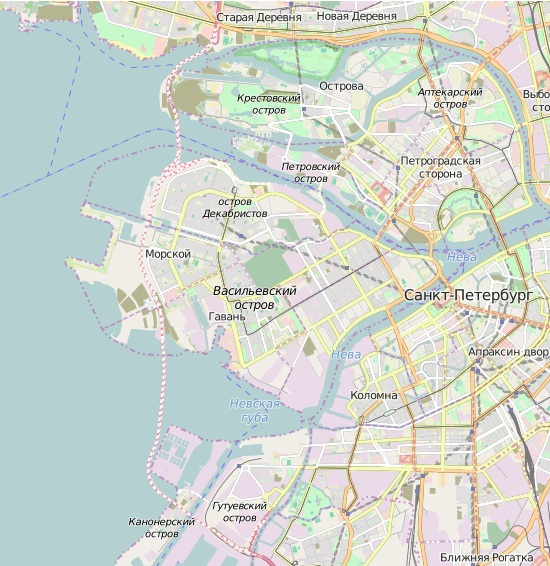

Route information
- Length: 47 km (29 mi)
- Existed: 2008–present

Major junctions
- North end: The Beloostrov Interchange with E18, Beloostrov E18
- South end: A118 Saint Petersburg Ring Road, Saint Petersburg

Location
- Country: Russia

Highway system
- Russian Federal Highways

The Western High-Speed Diameter (ЗСД, ZSD, Russian: Западный скоростной диаметр, romanized: Zapadnyy skorostnoy diametr) is a toll motorway in Saint Petersburg, Russia. The first section of the road open to traffic was an eight-lane motorway connecting the southern section of the A118 beltway with two junctions at the Kirovsky and Moskovsky Districts, respectively. Other sections of the highway were under construction and eventually formed a corridor through the western districts of St. Petersburg to cross the northern portion of the A118 beltway in Yuntolovo and to meet the E-18/M-10 route at the Beloostrov junction. A new 4-km-long section of the highway was slated to open in late 2011. It connects the northern terminus of the first open segment with the industrial western part of the Kirovsky district which hosts the port of St. Petersburg. A 25-km-long section running from Beloostrov to the Primorsky District was scheduled to open in late 2012. The overall length of the Western High-Speed Diameter highway was projected at 47 km (29 mi) upon the scheduled completion in 2013 - 2014. A discount is given during the overnight hours (11 pm - 7 am) and for the vehicles equipped with a transponder. WHSD cost 210 billion rubles. In December, 2016 the whole motorway was open for traffic.

The Western High-Speed Diameter is the most popular road in Russia with more than 380,000 payments per day. The unique objects were created within the construction of the Western High-Speed Diameter, including the longest bridge constructions in Russia (except the Crimean bridge): the Southern Flyover of the main road route over the Sea channel and Korabelny fairway – 9,4 km and the Northern Flyover of the main road route over the Petrovsky fairway and Elagin fairway – 8,8 km. The Western High-Speed Diameter is an inner-city multilane highway, which made it possible to cross a 5-million metropolis in 20 minutes and provides 24-hour transport link between southern and northern districts of St. Petersburg. The highway ensures the transport accessibility of the Sea port areas, unloads the historic center of the city, the Ring Road and the road network. For the first time ever, thanks to WHSD implementation all districts of St. Petersburg became accessible to drivers 24/7.

The Western High-Speed Diameter is divided into three sections: Southern, Central and Northern. The Central section mostly consists of the unique bridgeworks such as a cable-stayed bridge over the Korabelny fairway, a cable-stayed bridge over the Petrovsky fairway and a double-deck bridge over the Sea channel. The Central section of WHSD incorporates a whole complex of artificial structures and is considered the most challenging part of the road in respect of engineering solutions and construction process.

== Description ==
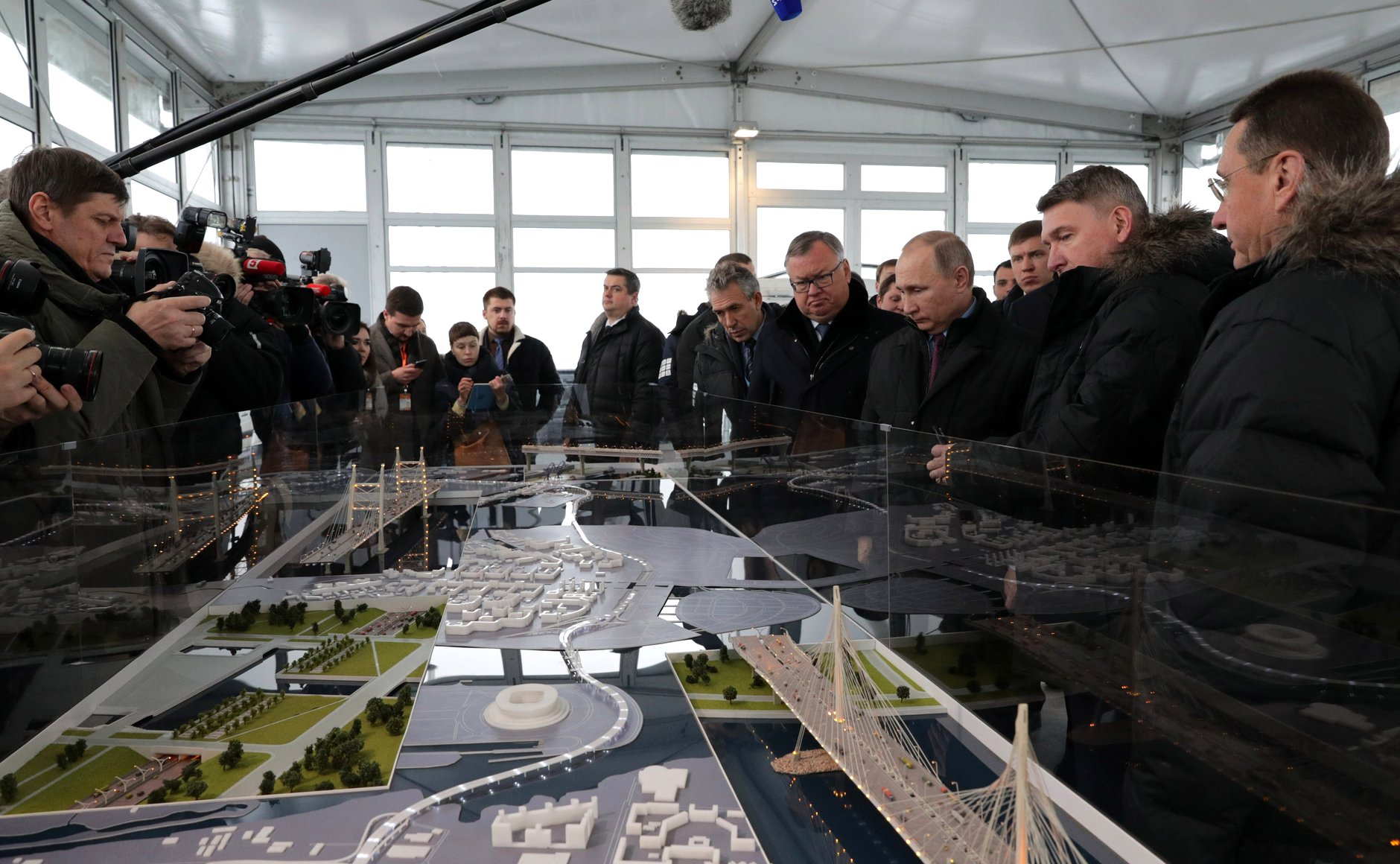
Vladimir Putin attended the opening ceremony of the central section of the Western High-Speed Diameter on 2 December 2016.

The Western High-Speed Diameter is a 46.6-kilometre road with a total length, including all exit and entry ramps and interchanges, of over 70 kilometres. It features 15 interchanges, and its width varies from four to eight lanes. The new road is expected to ease congestion in the historic centre of St Petersburg, the St Petersburg Ring Road and road network, enabling drivers to cross the city in less than 20 minutes.

== The main objects of the Central Section of the WHSD ==
=== Cable-stayed bridge over the Korabelny Fairway ===
An unusual design was chosen for the Korabelny bridge. Each pylon column is inclined inwards and also towards the bridge centre line. Such an architectural solution repeats the geometry of a drawbridge, one of the most recognizable symbols of St. Petersburg.

- bridge length - 620 m
- length of central span - 320 m
- bridge undercelarance - 35 m

=== Cable-stayed bridge over the Petrovsky Fairway ===
For the bridge over Petrovsky fairway an interesting engineering solution was suggested – a fan arrangement of the cable-stays. Such an intertwining of the threads provides the bridge an original, airy outlook.

- bridge length - 580 m
- length of central span - 240 m
- bridge underclearance - 25 m

=== Double-deck bridge over the Sea channel ===
The superstructure of the bridge is a 6-m-deep truss with spans of up to 168m, The bridge crosses Kanonersky Island and the main channel to the port at a maximum clearance of 52 m. It is the highest bridge in St. Petersburg.

In December 2019, a nuclear-powered icebreaker Arktika successfully passed under the bridge, the height of which coincides with the height of the icebreaker.

- ship clearance – 52 m
- overall length – 720 m
- central span length – 168 m

The bridges of the Western High-Speed Diameter now can be regarded as other architectural symbols of St. Petersburg as an example of harmonious urban development. The cable-stayed bridges became sites of attraction to citizens and tourists. For example, the Korabelny bridge. From the coastal part of Primorsky Victory Park one can see the beautiful Petrovsky bridge, which harmoniously fit into the city skyline.

== Environmental impact ==
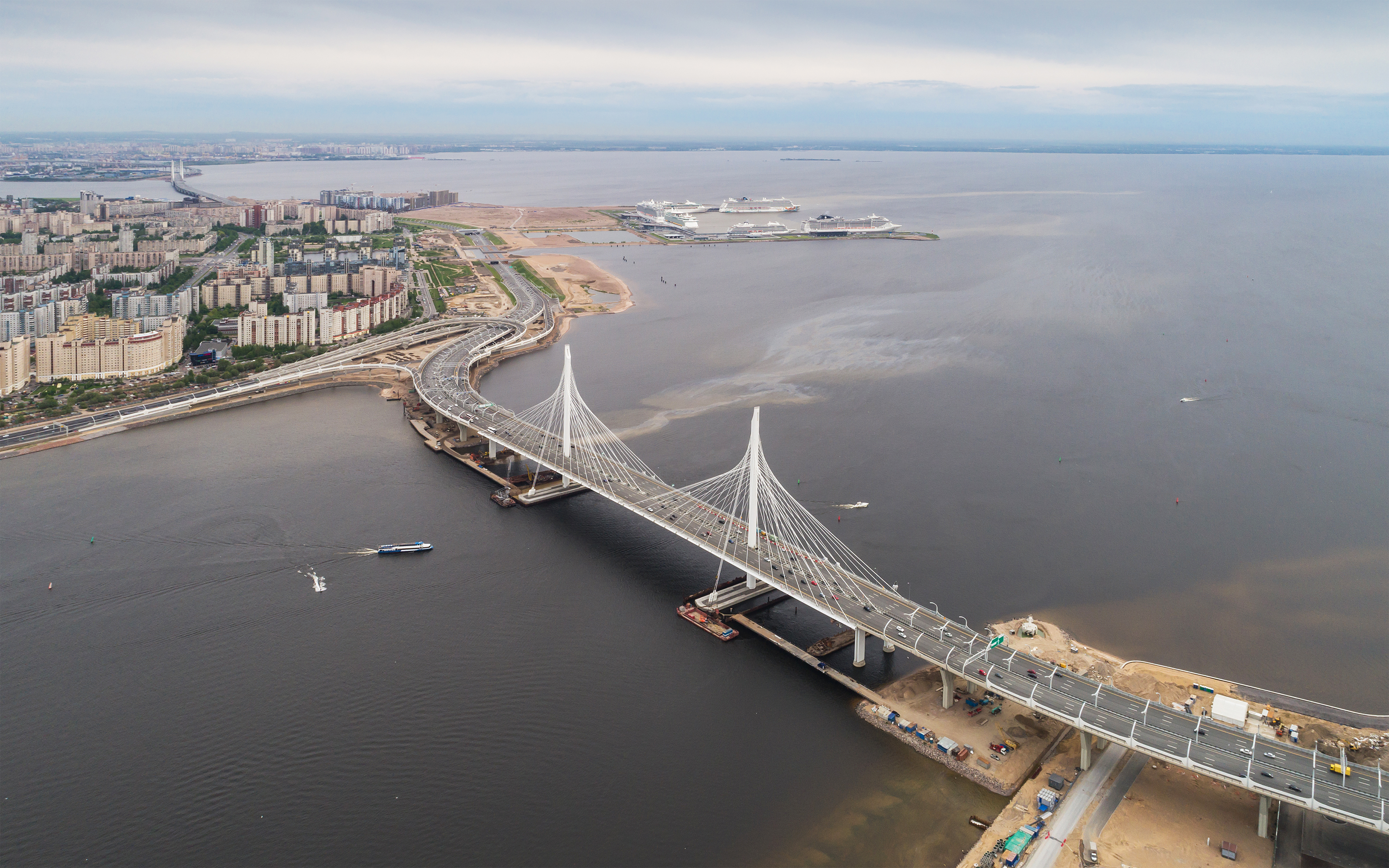
Central part of Western High-Speed Diameter

Part of the toll highway will run near the Yuntolovo Nature Reserve on the northern outskirts of St Petersburg. From the outset, the road construction project has caused significant public concern about a negative impact on the ecology of the reserve, as well as possible rezoning of areas of the nature reserve for commercial and residential development. Concerned citizens have formed a movement to save the forest and swampland of the nature reserve from harmful construction projects along the route of the new highway.

== Managing company ==
The Western High-Speed Diameter is operated by NCH, LLC. According to the PPPA, NCH attracted funding for construction of the Central Section of WHSD. NCH also operates WHSD under the 30 years Concession.

== CEO ==
Alexey Bnatov was born in Moscow, 1959.

Career:

1982–1983: Engineer in VTO “Medexpert” MVT USSR,

1983–1987: Engineer in State machinery of USSR Economic Adviser in Karachi (Pakistan),

1987–1989: Deputy Head of Foreign Affairs Department, Ministry of Medical and Microbiological Industry,

1989–1990: Deputy CEO for Marketing and Sales, Russian-Pakistan joint enterprise,

1990–1992: Head of Russian Representative office of Canadian GFG Packaging Company,

1992–1997: Head of Department of AkzoNobel,

1997–2010: Vice-President, Business Manager in CIS (the Commonwealth of Independent States) of Greif Company,

2010–2012: CEO, “Agro-Invest” Group,

2012 up to now: CEO, Northern Capital Highway.

== Awards ==
The project of the Western High-Speed Diameter received multiple awards, including international ones. The project of creation and operation on the base of PPP of an urban speedway– Western High-Speed Diameter – has become a major world contract in the sphere of road construction and was awarded a number of honorary awards by well-known international economic editions. Thus, in 2013 foreign media called this project “Agreement of the year in the European sector of turnpikes”. Besides, WHSD as the best infrastructural project was marked with the award “The formula of movement” of the RF Ministry of transport, as well as with “Award for development” by Vneshcombank.

Records
Preceded by President Bridge	Russia’s longest bridge (south overpass of WHSD); 2012 – 2018^{1}	Succeeded by Crimean Bridge^{1}
Notes and references
1. Crimean Bridge is the longest bridge built by Russia, but whether longest in Russia depends on one's stance in the Crimean dispute.
