= President Bridge =

President Bridge Президентский мост
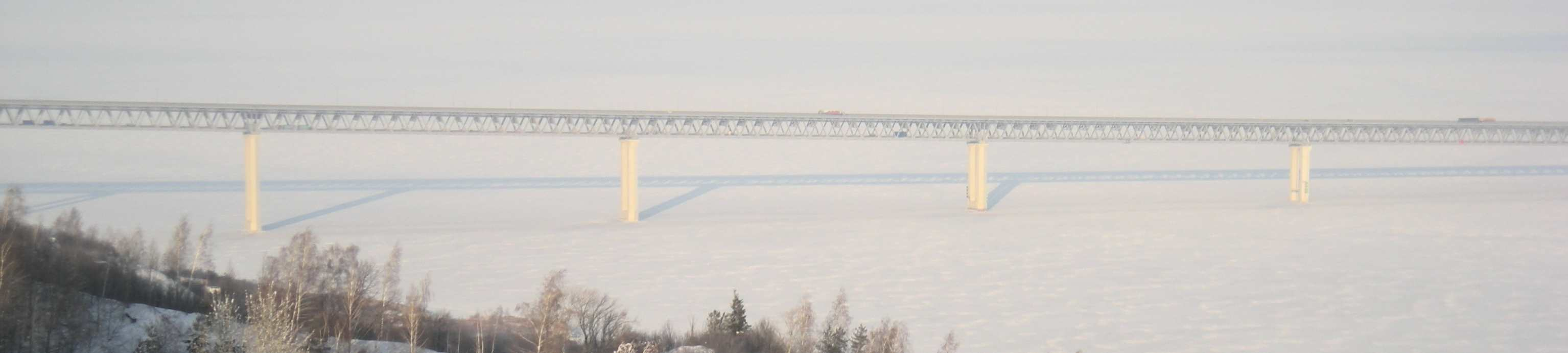
- President Bridge, 20 January 2010
- Coordinates: 54°21′36″N 48°26′34″E

Characteristics
- Total length: 5.825 km (3.619 mi)
- No. of spans: 25

History
- Construction start: 1986
- Opened: 24 November 2009

Statistics
- Daily traffic: 40,000 vehicles/day

Location
- Interactive map of President Bridge

The President Bridge (Russian: Президентский мост) is a truss bridge that crosses over the Volga river in Ulyanovsk Oblast, Russia, connecting the city of Ulyanovsk with the east side of the city Ulyanovsk. It is the second longest bridge in Russia, and one of the longest bridges in Europe, with a length of 5.825 kilometres (3.619 mi), and 12.98 kilometres (8.07 mi) including the connecting highway .

It has 25 spans of 221 metres (725 ft) and weighs 4,000 tons. The bridge's capacity is over 40,000 vehicles per day.

== History ==
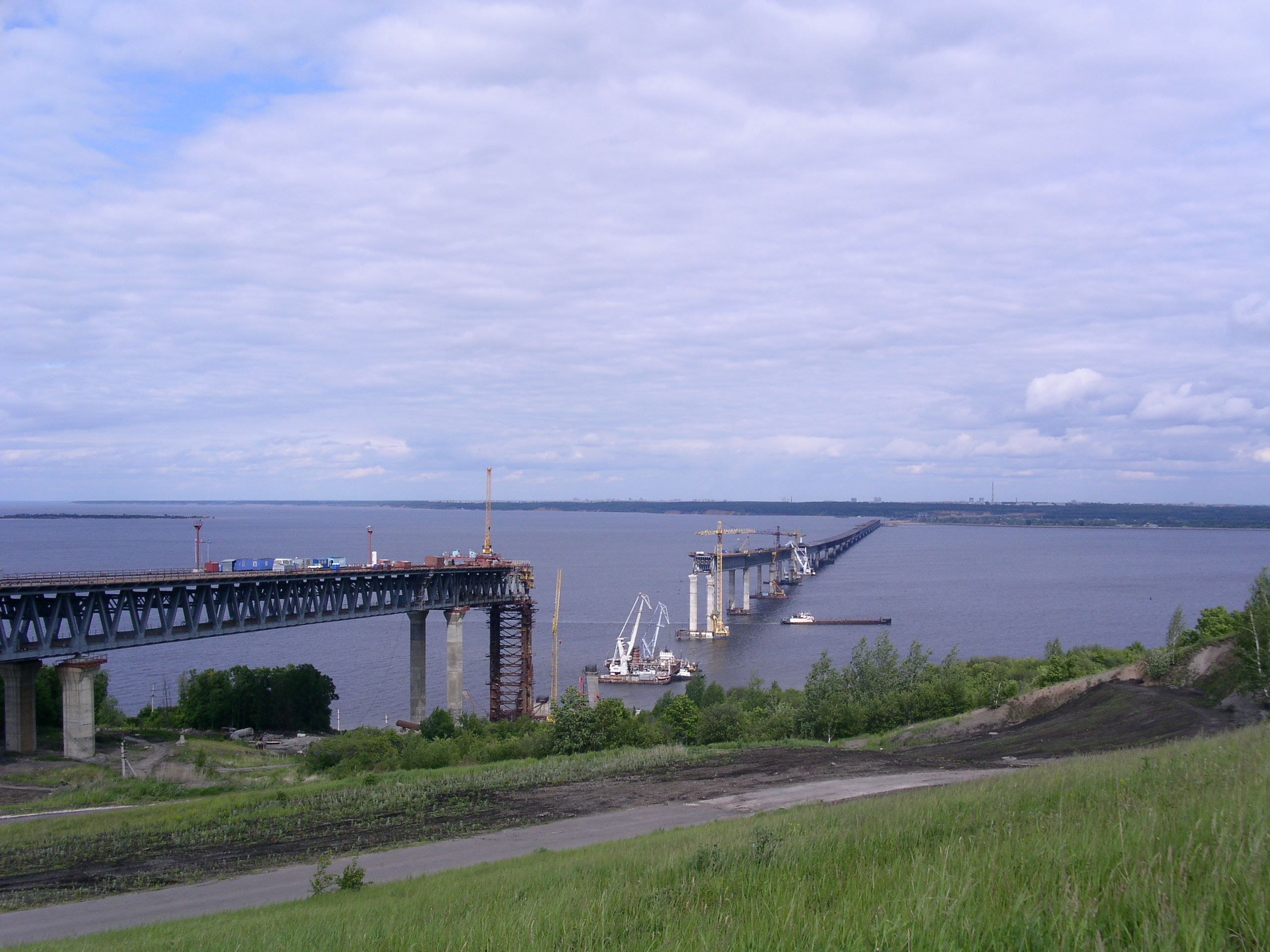
The bridge under construction, June 2008

The new bridge was built as the aging Ulyanovsk Bridge (built 1913–1916) could no longer cope with the growing traffic. It was constructed as a part of a federal modernization program and aimed at linking the European part of Russia with the Urals, Siberia and the Far East.

The design of the bridge began in 1980, and the construction in 1986, originally planned to take nine years. The first pillars were installed in 1988, and the first span in 1992. It cost a total of 38.4 billion rubles (2008 prices).

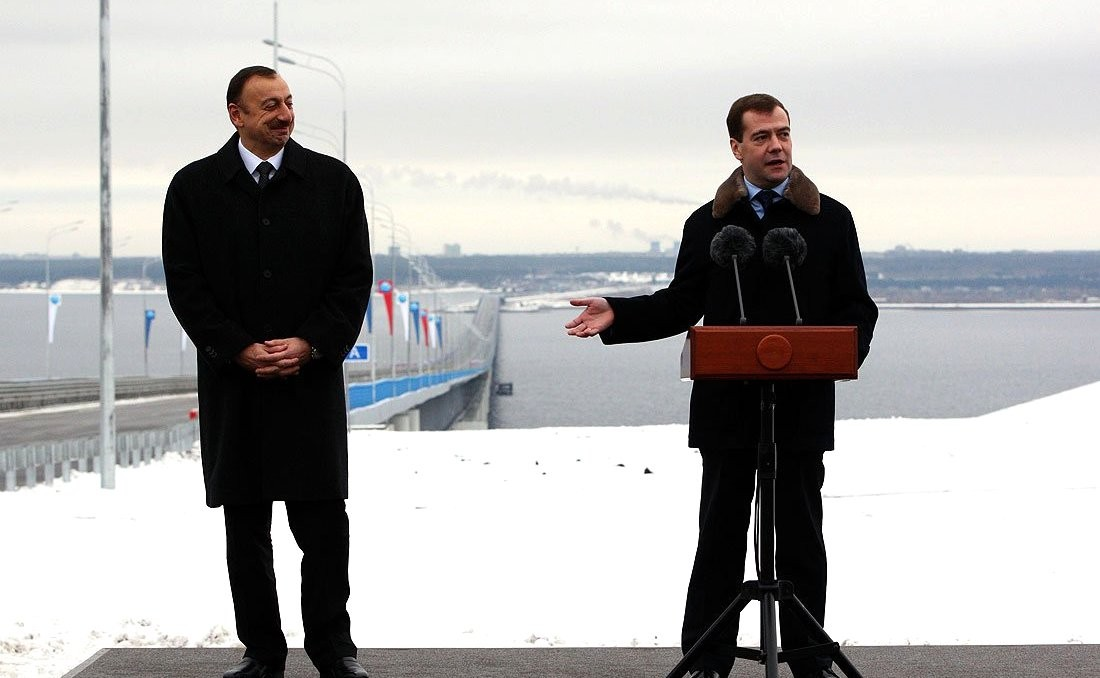
Ilham Aliyev and Dmitry Medvedev on opening ceremony, 24 November 2009

The opening ceremony took place on 24 November 2009, and was attended by the Russian President Dmitry Medvedev and Ilham Aliyev, President of Azerbaijan. At this stage only the first part of the bridge was opened; the lower tier of the bridge was scheduled to open in 2012. It took more than 23 years to build the bridge; completion was delayed significantly due to lack of funding and economic difficulties following Russia's transition after the collapse of the Soviet Union.

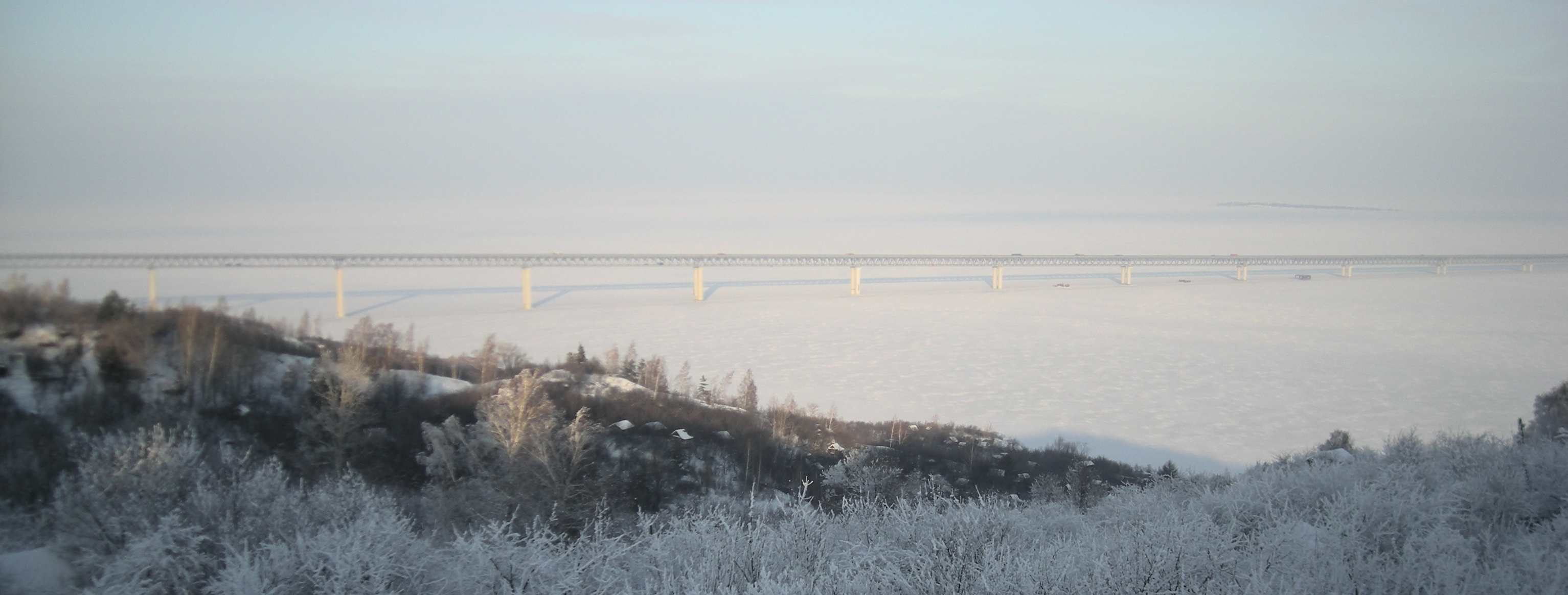

Records
Preceded by Yuribey Bridge	Russia’s longest bridge 2009–2012	Succeeded by South overpass of the Western High-Speed Diameter
