= Bolshoy Obukhovsky Bridge =

Bridge in Saint Petersburg, Russia

Bolshoi Obukhovsky Bridge Большо́й Обу́ховский мост
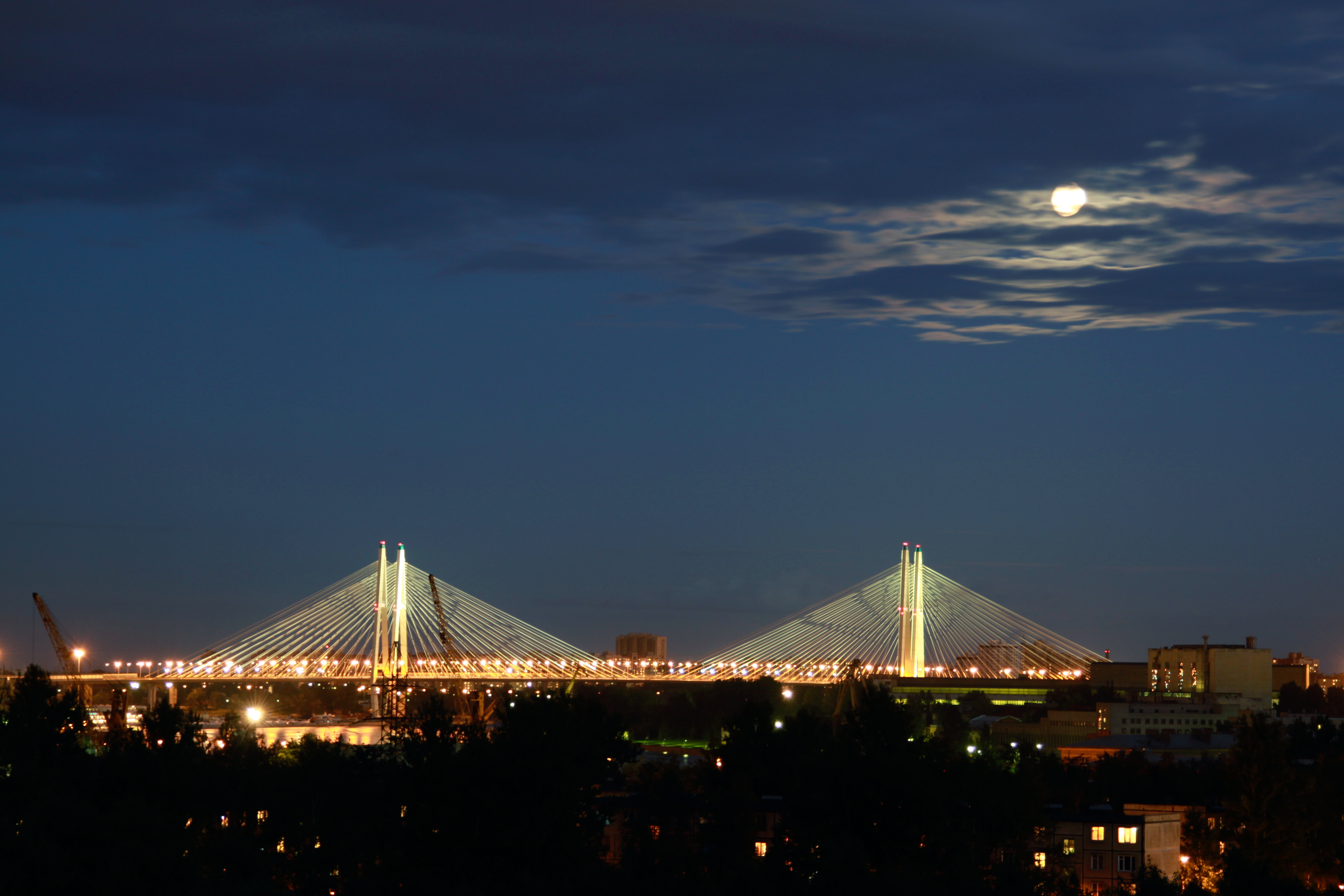
- Coordinates: 59°51′14.7″N 30°29′32.65″E
- Carries: Saint Petersburg Ring Road (4 lanes each bridge, 8 lanes total)
- Crosses: Neva River
- Locale: Saint Petersburg

Characteristics
- Design: Cable-stayed bridge
- Total length: 2,824 metres (9,265 ft)
- Width: 25 metres (82 ft) each bridge
- Height: 120.5 metres (395 ft)
- Longest span: 382 metres (1,253 ft)
- Clearance below: 30 metres (98 ft)

History
- Opened: 15 December 2004; 19 October 2007 (twin bridge)

Location
- Interactive map of Bolshoi Obukhovsky Bridge; Большо́й Обу́ховский мост

The Great Obukhovo Bridge (Russian: Большо́й Обу́ховский мост, Bolshoy Obukhovsky most) is the newest (not taking into account the Blagoveshchensky Bridge rebuilt in 2007) bridge across the Neva River in Saint Petersburg, Russia. It is the only bridge across the Neva which is not a drawbridge. One of the longest bridges in Russia, it is the first fixed bridge and largest bridge across the Neva. It is the largest bridge in St. Petersburg by the size of the covered span (382 m). It is located in Nevsky District, in the middle stream of the Neva. It connects Obukhovskaya Oborony Avenue with the Oktyabrskaya embankment. It is a cable-stayed bridge; the steel wire ropes are the key element of the supporting construction. But what looks like a bridge is actually two identical twin bridges with opposite directions of movement along them. One is located upstream of the Neva (southern) and is for driving eastward, the other downstream (north) is for driving in a western direction.

== Construction ==
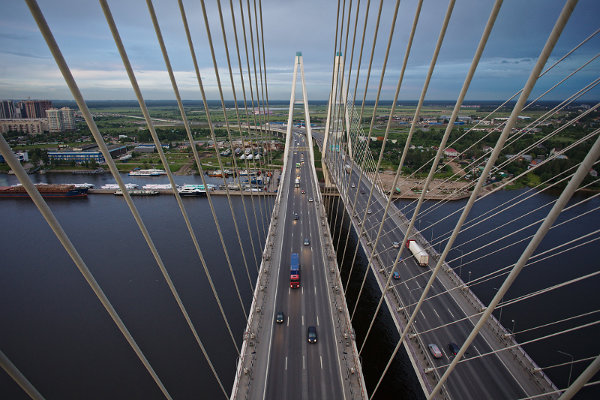
View from the pylon of the bridge to the roadbed and cables..

The general designer of the bridge crossing was CJSC Stroyproekt Institute; the designer of the cable-stayed part was CJSC Giprostroymost Institute in Saint Petersburg; the general contractor was OAO Mostootryad No. 19. The construction of the bridge was attended by: Voronezhstalmost, Mostootryad No. 10, Mostootryad No. 18, Mostootryad No. 90, MTF Mostootryad No. 114, and Mostootryad No. 125, which are part of Mostotrest, (which was involved in the construction of the right-bank part of the cable-stayed bridge, as well as ramps on the left bank) and other subcontractors. The bridge was built in a section of the Neva that is quite difficult for navigation, not far from the crooked knee bend, but with 126 m high pylons widely spaced along the banks of the Neva and a high span, the bridge is completely invisible to ships passing along the river. Road junctions with Oktyabrskaya Embankment and Obukhovsky Oborony Avenue are complicated, and if the first one stretched for several hundred square meters on the still free right bank of the Neva, then the second one was built on a small piece of land between residential buildings on Rabfakovskaya Street and Obukhovsky Oborony Avenue, where, in addition, there is a tram line and railway tracks leading from the Obukhovsky railway station to the Obukhovsky plant.

The total length of the bridge crossing, including the approach ramps, is 2884 meters, of which the bridge itself is 994 meters, including the navigable span of 382 meters. The span height above the water surface (under-bridge clearance) is 30 meters, which allows large vessels to pass freely under the bridge.

Because of this bridge, the maximum size of vessels capable of passing along the Neva from Lake Ladoga to the Neva Bay or in the opposite direction was reduced in height by 10 m. The minimum under-bridge dimension of bridges across the Neva (and the main navigable arm, the Bolshaya Neva) was 40 m, determined by the lowest bridges in the extended position (Volodarsky, Kuzminsky and Ladoga bridges) but Bolshoy Obukhovsky made it 10 m lower - only 30 m high.

In 2003, the "Cable-stayed Bridge Museum" was opened at the construction site - the only museum of one construction object in St. Petersburg. Upon completion of construction at the end of 2008, the museum was relocated to the territory of the St. Petersburg branch of OAO Mostootryad No. 19 in Krasnoye Selo. In 2006, a New Year tree was installed on the newly built left-bank pylon of the second stage of the bridge. Thanks to the pylon, it has become the tallest Christmas tree in the city.

== Name ==
It was the first time in the history of the city when the name of the bridge was chosen by a referendum among residents of Saint Petersburg and Leningrad Oblast. Among suggested names were, for example, was "Olga Berggolts Bridge" and others. The bridge is named after the nearby Obukhovsky Okrug, considering that there is a Obukhovsky Bridge in Saint Petersburg already. The well-established name "Cable-stayed bridge" is also used, for example, it is on the distance indicator on Obukhovskoy Oborony Avenue near Volodarsky Bridge (Jul, 22, 2017).

However, the toponymic commission of St. Petersburg does not intend to rename the bridge to Vantovy (Cable-stayed bridge), nor to add this option as an equal one. “We have many such semi-official names. They live for themselves and do not interfere with anyone. Peter the Great Bridge, Staro-Nevsky Avenue, Upper and Lower Highways in Kurortny District. You could also say that no one uses the toponym Zelenogorskoye Highway,” says A. G. Vladimirovich, a member of the toponymic commission.

== Opening ==
The opening of the first stage of the bridge took place on 15 December 2004. It was an important component of the Saint Petersburg Ring Road. The President of the Russian Federation V. V. Putin took part in the opening of the bridge. On 19 October 2007, the “twin” bridge - the "second stage" of the bridge - was inaugurated, and by January 2008 each bridge was four lanes in one direction.

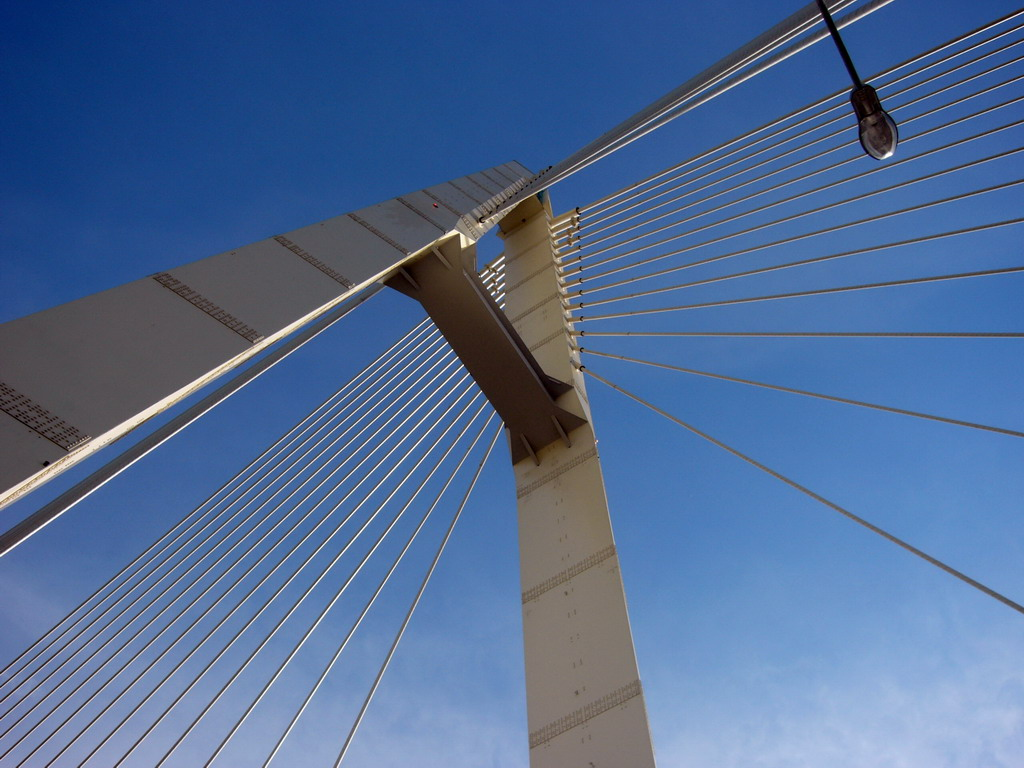
Pylon of the Bolshoy Obukhovsky Bridge

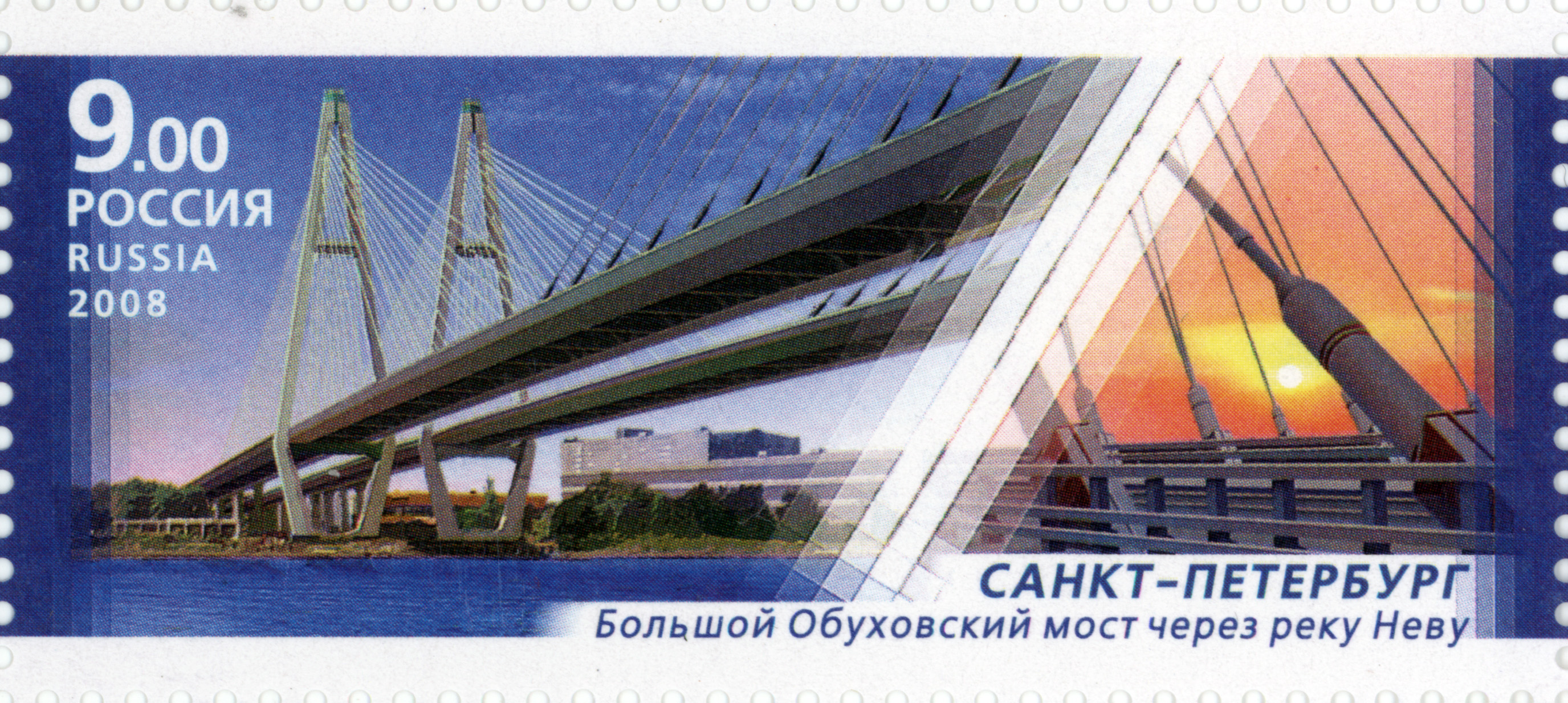
Bolshoy Obukhovsky Bridge on a Russian Postage Stamp

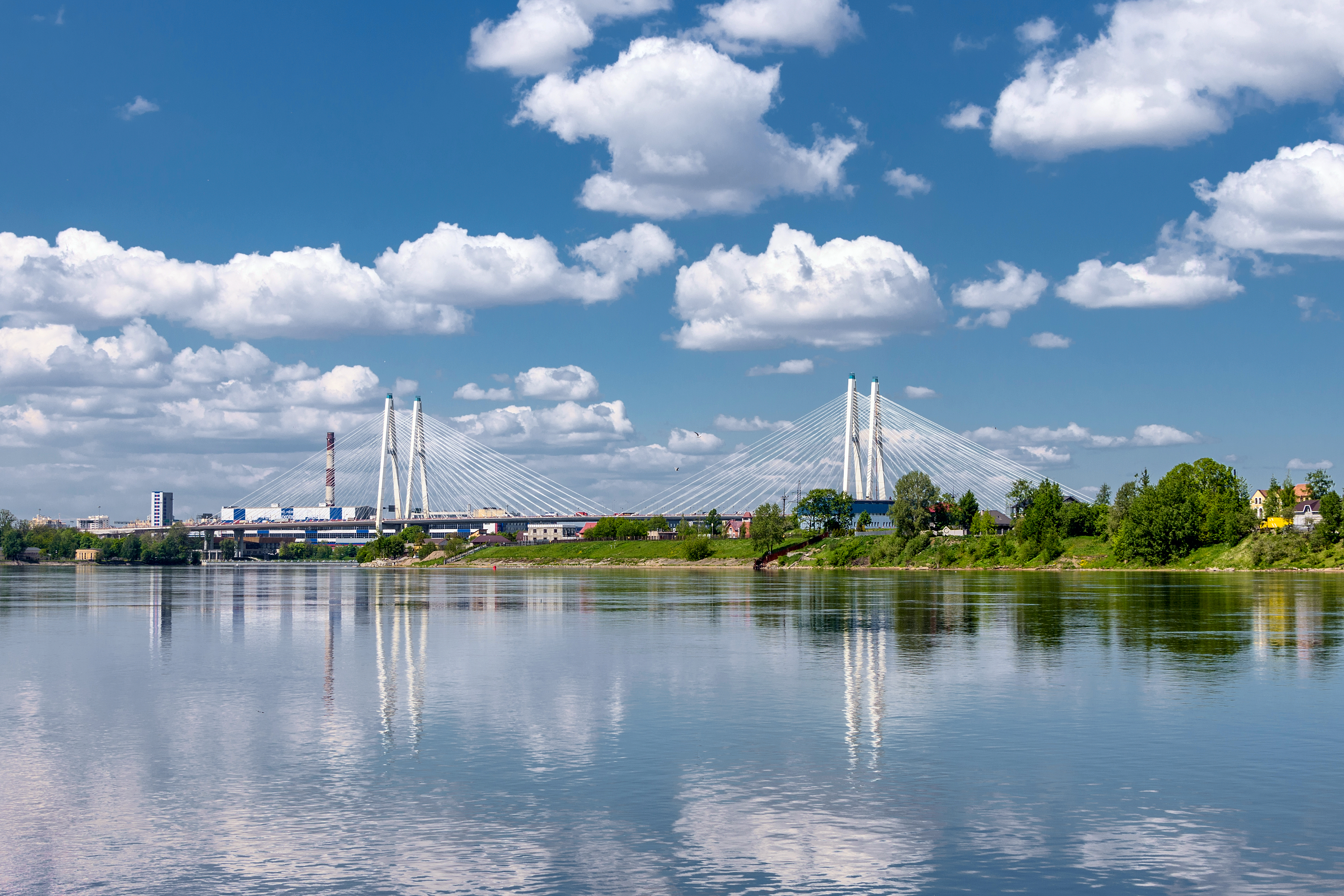
View of the bridge from Rybatsky District

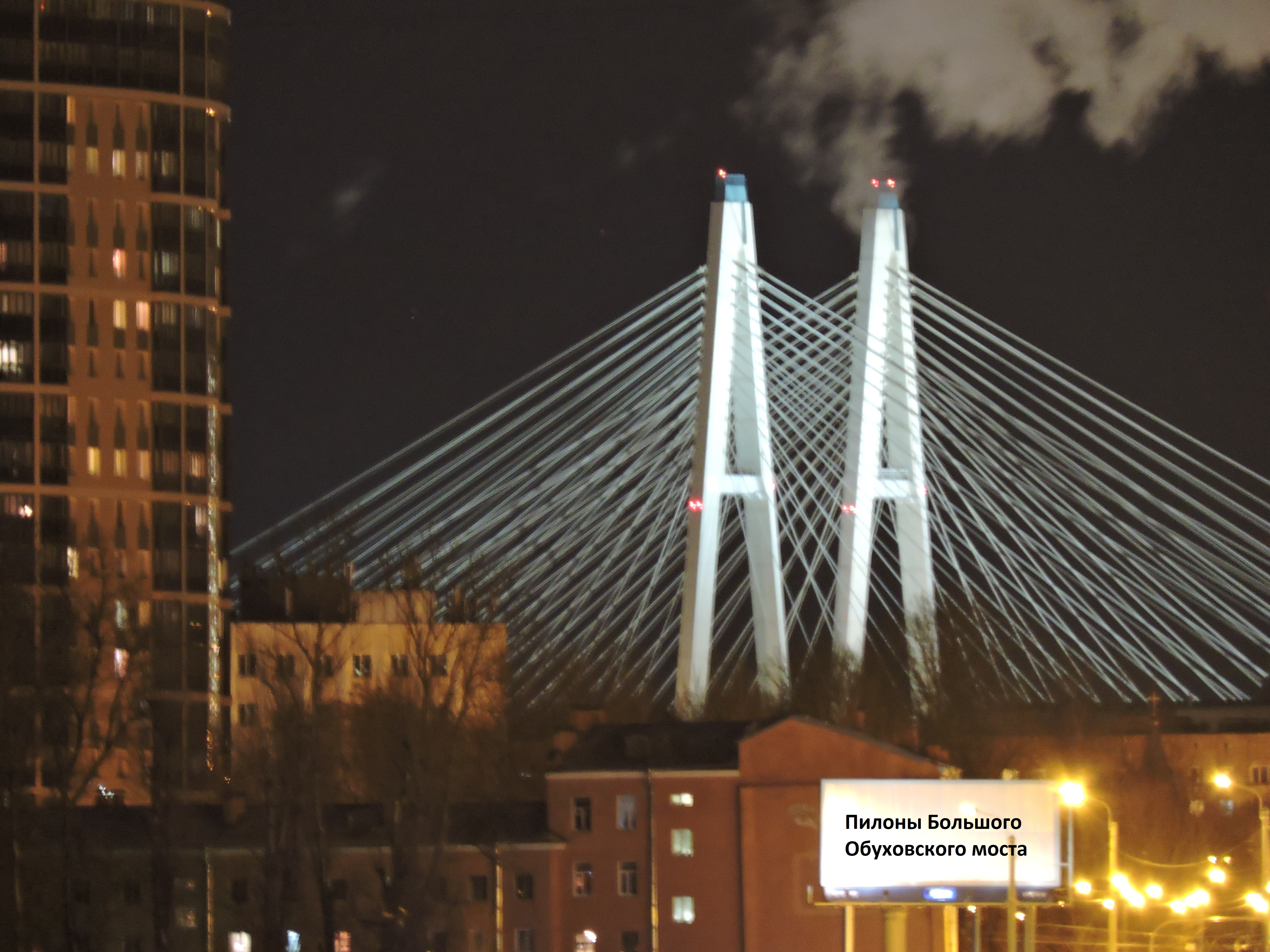
Evening lighting of the pylons

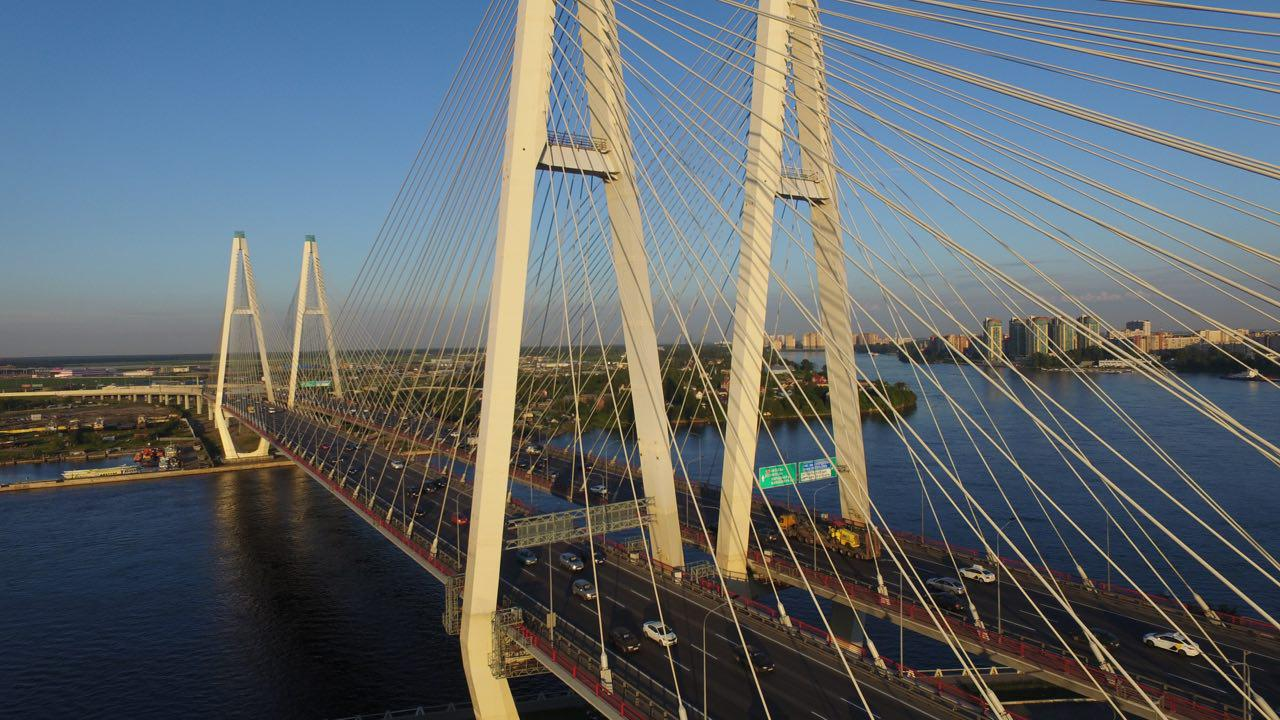
Photo from the inner side of the Ring Road

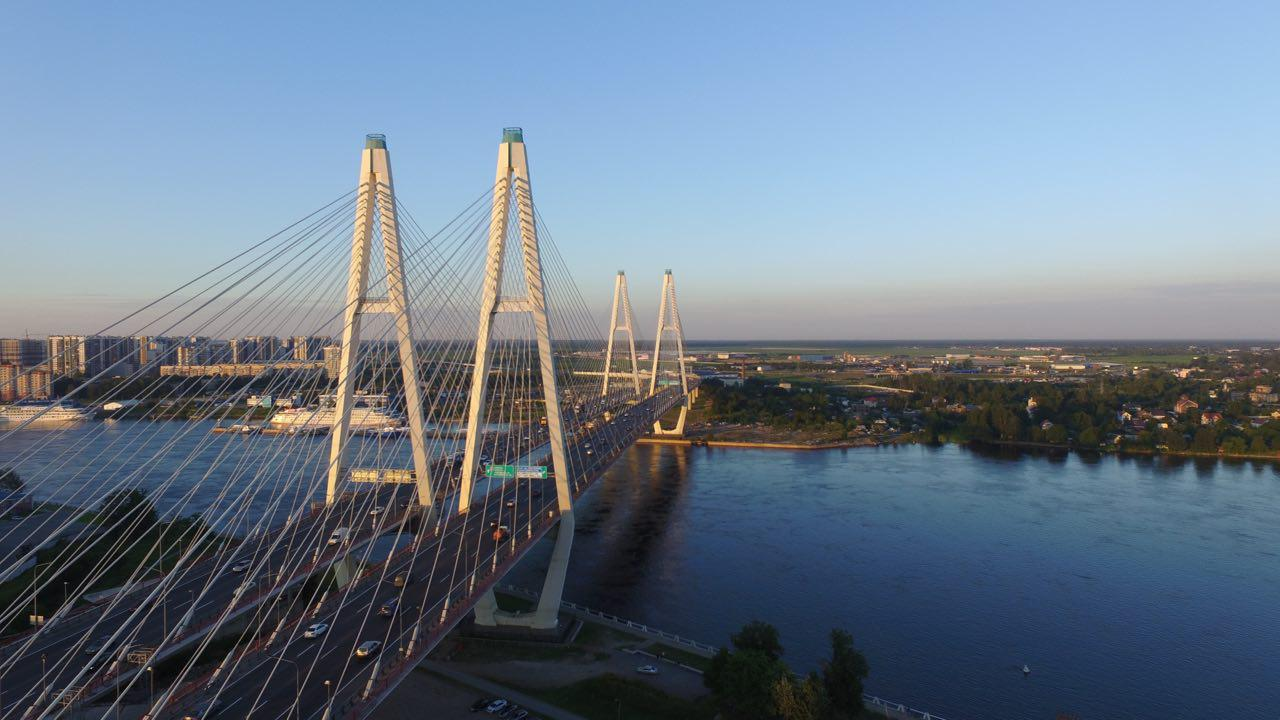
Photo of the outer side of the Ring Road

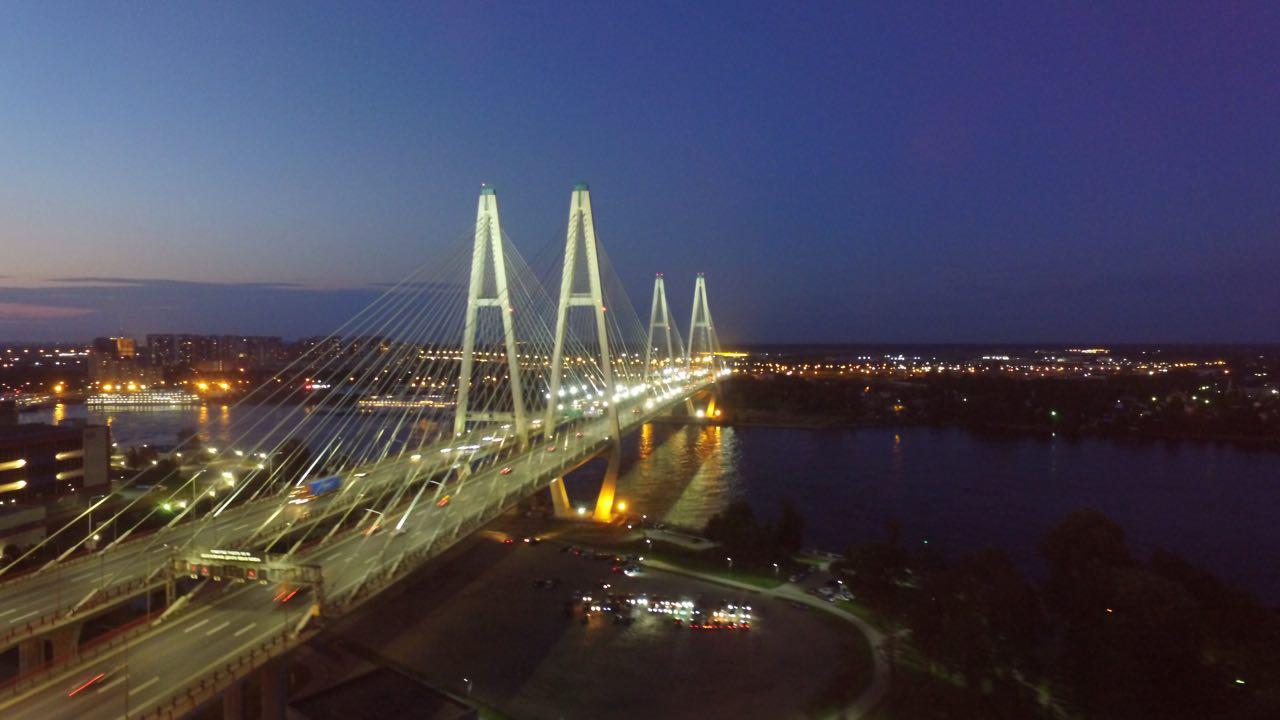
Meeting of the auto club under the Cable-stayed bridge in the evening

== See also ==
- List of bridges in Saint Petersburg
