= Bandy World Championship Y-21 =

International bandy competition

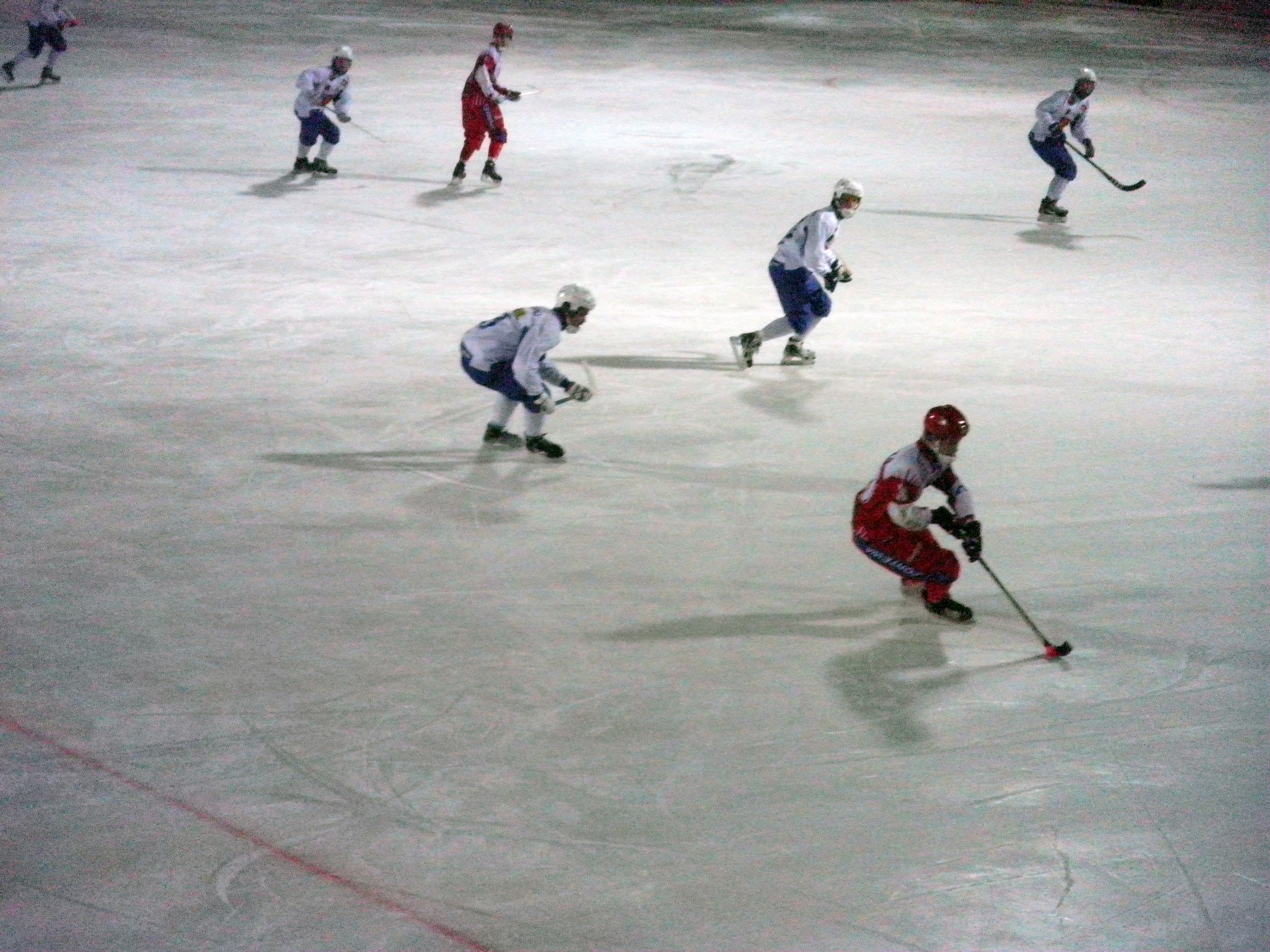
- Russia vs. Finland, World Championship Y23, 2011
- Status: Active
- Genre: Sports event
- Frequency: Biannually
- Location: Various
- Inaugurated: 1990; 36 years ago
- Organizer: FIB

The Bandy World Championship Y-21 is a Youth Bandy World Championship up to the age of 21 years. Usually, only the core bandy playing nations take part. The designation is sometimes given as U-21 instead of Y-23 or U-23, probably as a way to compare it to the U-21 competitions in association football (indeed, the UEFA European Under-21 Championship was originally for under-23 teams).

== History ==
The first two Bandy World Championships Y-23 were held in 1990 and 1992, but after this initial period, a long period existed whereby the Y-23 championship wasn't held. It was taken up again in 2011 and has been held biannually ever since.

The Russian Y23 team won the 2013 World Championship Y23, which was held in Obukhovo, Moscow Oblast, Russia. The competition ran from December 6–8. Russia defeated Sweden in the final and Finland beat Norway for the bronze medals. Kazakhstan also participated.

== Results ==
=== Under-23 championships ===
Year	Host	Final			Third place match		
Year	Host	Champion	Score	Runner-up	Third place	Score	Fourth place
1990	Sweden	Soviet Union	Round robin	Sweden	Finland	Round robin	Norway
1992	(Russia) Berezniki	Sweden	Round robin	CIS	Finland		
2011	(Russia) Obukhovo	Russia	5–4 (OT)	Sweden	Finland	7–4	Kazakhstan
2013	(Russia) Obukhovo	Russia	11–2	Sweden	Finland	5–2	Norway

=== Under-21 championships ===
Year	Host	Final			Third place match		
Year	Host	Champion	Score	Runner-up	Third place	Score	Fourth place
2016	(Finland) Varkaus	Sweden	3–2	Russia	Finland		
2017	(Sweden) Söderhamn	Sweden	6–5 (OT)	Russia	Finland		
2019	(Russia) Arkhangelsk	Russia	7–1	Sweden	Finland	6–0	Kazakhstan

== Medal table ==
Rank	Team	Gold	Silver	Bronze
1.	Russia, Soviet Union and CIS	4	3	0
	Russia	3	2	0
	Soviet Union	1	0	0
	CIS	0	1	0
2.	Sweden	3	4	0
3.	Finland	0	0	7
