= Obukhovsky (surname) =

Obukhovsky (Russian: Обухо́вский; masculine) or Obukhovskaya (Обухо́вская; feminine) is a Russian last name.

There are two theories regarding the origins of this last name. According to the first one, it is simply a variety of the last name Obukhov, which is derived from the nickname "Обух" (Obukh). However, it is more likely that this last name was first given to one of the natives of a rural locality of Obukhovo.
