= Hienadź Sahanovič =

Belarusian historian (born 1961)

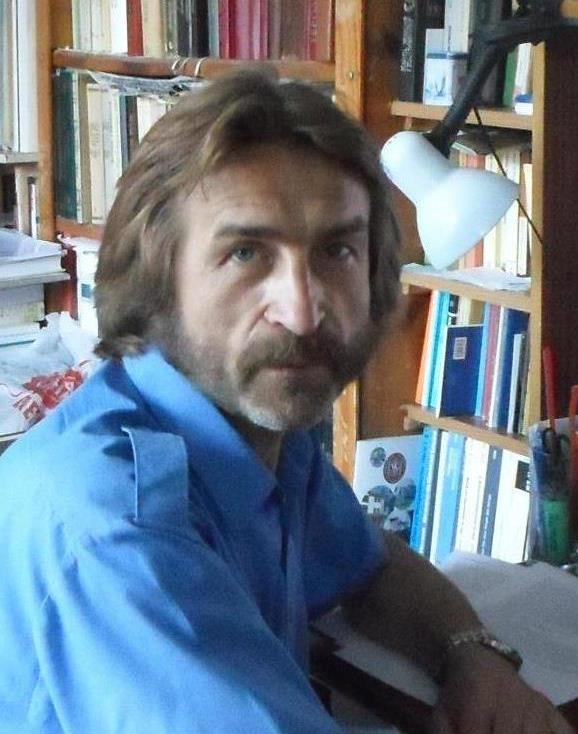
- Sahanovič in 2017
- Born: 13 January 1961 (age 65); Turnaja, Ivatsevichy District, Brest Region, Byelorussian Soviet Socialist Republic

Academic background
- Education: Maxim Tank Belarusian State Pedagogical University

Academic work
- Sub-discipline: History of Eastern Europe
- Institutions: University of Warsaw; European Humanities University

Hienadź Sahanovič (Генадзь Сагановіч; born 13 January 1961) is a Belarusian historian. He specializes in the early modern period of Central European and Belarusian history.

== Education and academic career ==
In 1984 Sahanovič graduated from the Maxim Tank Belarusian State Pedagogical University in Minsk. Beginning in 1986 he became an active member of the democratic opposition in Soviet Belarus. In 1989 Sahanovič obtained a PhD degree in history from the Institute of History, National Academy of Sciences of Belarus, where he worked as a researcher between 1984 and 2005. His employment was terminated, in the course of the politically motivated purge of historians and social scientists, whose research did not follow the government's official line. Sahanovič moved to the European Humanities University (EHU), then still based in the Belarusian capital of Minsk. The EHU ceased operating in Belarus in 2004.

In 1994 Sahanovič founded the journal Belaruski Histaryčny Ahliad/Belarusian Historical Review, and since then has served as its Editor-in-Chief. At the same time, he was also a member of the editorial board of another new learned journal (established in 1993), devoted to Belarusian studies, namely, Беларусіка Belarusika/Albaruthenica, as founded and edited by the leading Belarusian philologist and historian Adam Maldzis (Адам Мальдзіс).

Sahanovič works and does research at the EHU, Vilnius, Lithuania, and at the University of Warsaw in the Center for Belarusian Studies, Center for East European Studies. In 2018 Sahanovič obtained a Habilitation degree in history from the University of Warsaw.

== Awards ==
For his research Sahanovič received a Belarusian PEN Club's Francišak Bahuševič award in 1995, and in 2001, an award conferred by the Polish journal Przegląd Wschodni.

== Books ==
- Айчыну сваю баронячы: Канстанцін Астрожскі Ajčynu svaju baroniačy: Kanstancin Astrožski [Kanstancin Astrožski: A Defender of His Fatherland]. 1992. Мiensk: Navuka i technika, 62pp. ISBN 9785343011098.
- Войска Вялікага княства Літоўскага ў XVI—XVII стст Vojska Vialikaha kniastva Litoŭskaha ŭ XVI-XVII stst [The Army of the Great Duchy of Lithuania in the 16th-17th Centuries]. 1994. Miensk: Navuka i technika, 79pp. ISBN 5-343-01244-3.
- Невядомая вайна, 1654—1667 Nieviadomaja vajna, 1654—1667 [ The Unknown War (book) ]. 1995. Miensk: Navuka i technika. 144pp. ISBN 9785343016376.
- With U. Arlov Дзесяць вякоў беларускай гісторыі, 862—1918 Dziesiać viakoŭ bielaruskaj historyi, 862—1918 [Ten Centuries of Belarusian History, 862-1918]. 1999. Vilnius: Naša Budučynia. 223pp. ISBN 9986-9219-8-8.
- Нарыс гісторыі Беларусі ад старажытнасці да канца XVIII ст. Narys historyi Bielarusi ad staražytnasci da kanca XVIII st. [An Overview of the History of Belarus from Antiquity to the End of the 18th Century] 2001. Miensk: Encykłapiedyks. 411pp. ISBN 9789856599340.
- Bibliografia białoruska, 1992-1994 [Belarusian Bibliography, 1992-1994] (Ser: Bibliografia Europy Wschodniej, Vol 13). 2002. Warsaw: Studium Europy Wschodniej UW, 240pp. ISBN 9788391490662
- Źródła pamięci historycznej współczesnej Białorusi. Powrót zachodniorusizmu [Sources of Historical memory: A Return of West Russianism] (Ser: Analizy Instytutu Europy Środkowo-Wschodniej, Vol 14) (translated from the Belarusian into Polish by Andrzej Gil). 2006. Lublin: Instytut Europy Środkowo-Wschodniej, 29pp. ISBN 9788360695036
- Грунвальд у беларускай гісторыі: спроба разбору палітычнага міфа Hrunvald u bielaruskaj historyi: sproba razboru palityčnaha mifa [ The Battle of Grunwald in Belarusian History: An Analysis of the Political Myth] (Ser: Бібліятэка часопіса "Беларускі Гістарычны Агляд" Biblijateka časopisa "Bielaruski Histaryčny Ahliad", Vol 27). 2015. Miensk: Medysont. 414pp. ISBN 9789857136025
