= Saint Petersburg Ring Road =

Road in Russia

Coordinates: 59°58′32″N 30°09′42″E

Saint Petersburg Ring Road
- Кольцевая автомобильная дорога вокруг Санкт-Петербурга
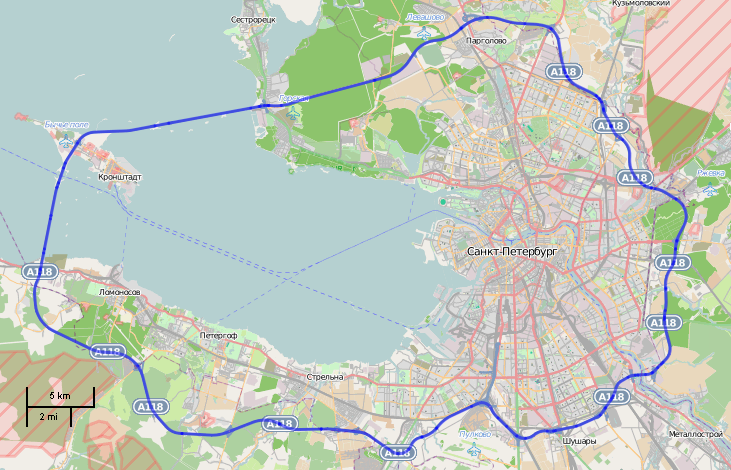

Route information
- Length: 142 km (88 mi)

Location
- Country: Russia
- Major cities: Saint Petersburg

Highway system
- Russian Federal Highways
← A 117	→ A 119

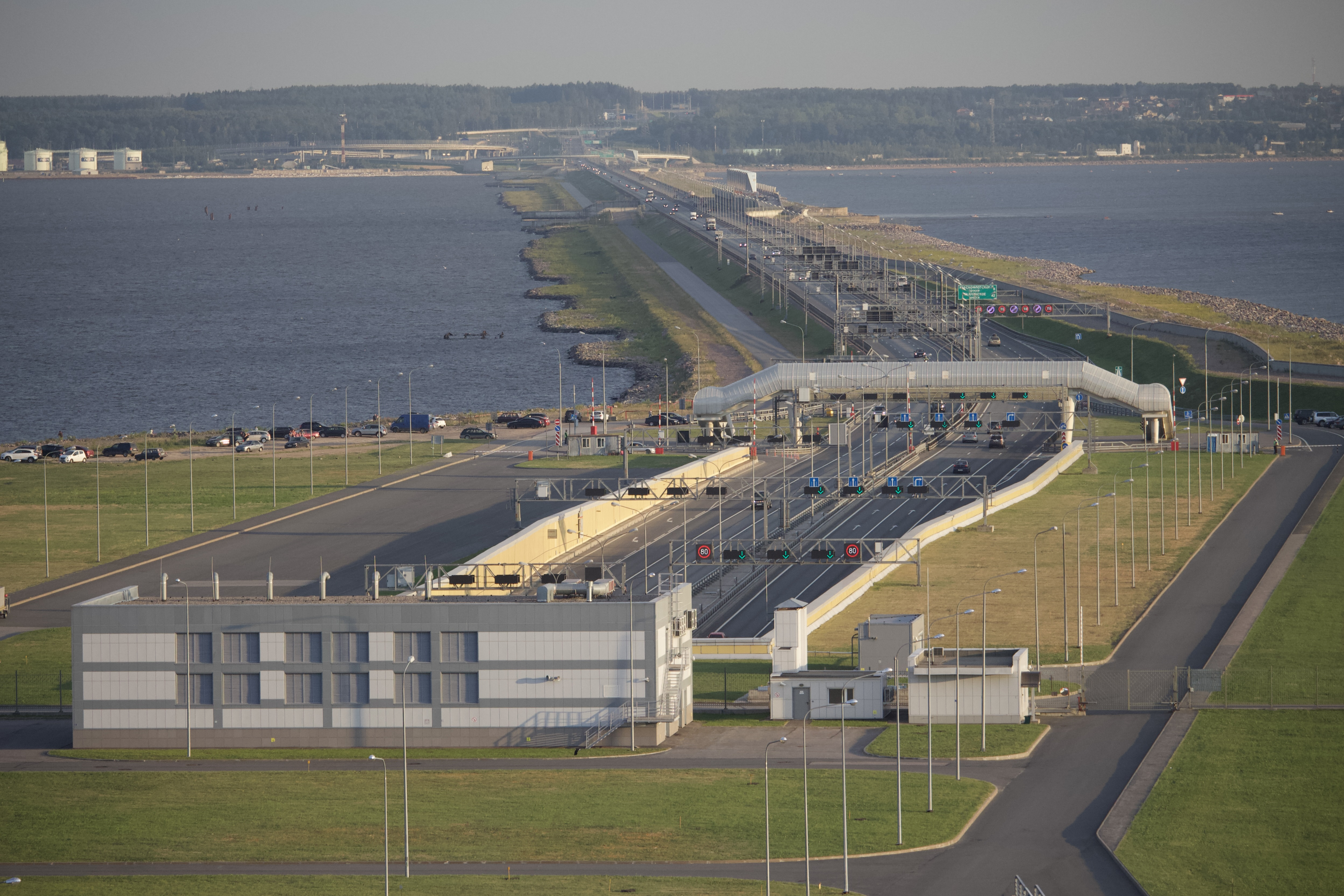
The toll plaza on the southern section of the Saint Petersburg Dam (A118 Ring Road), part of the flood protection barrier crossing the Gulf of Finland, seen facing west toward Kotlin Island and Kronshtadt.

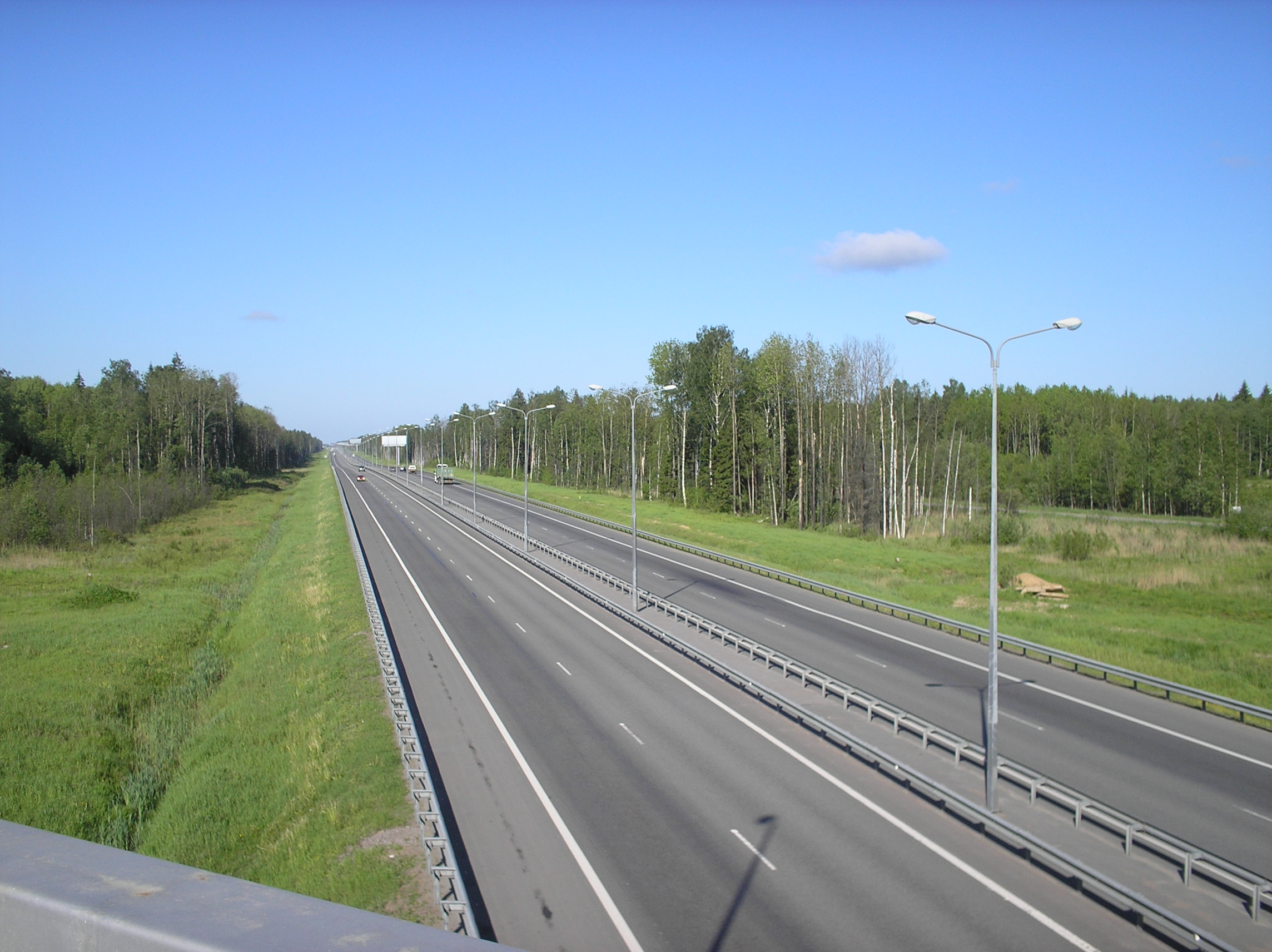
The Ring Road at the 8-km mark, in the vicinity of Gorskaya and the Gulf of Finland.

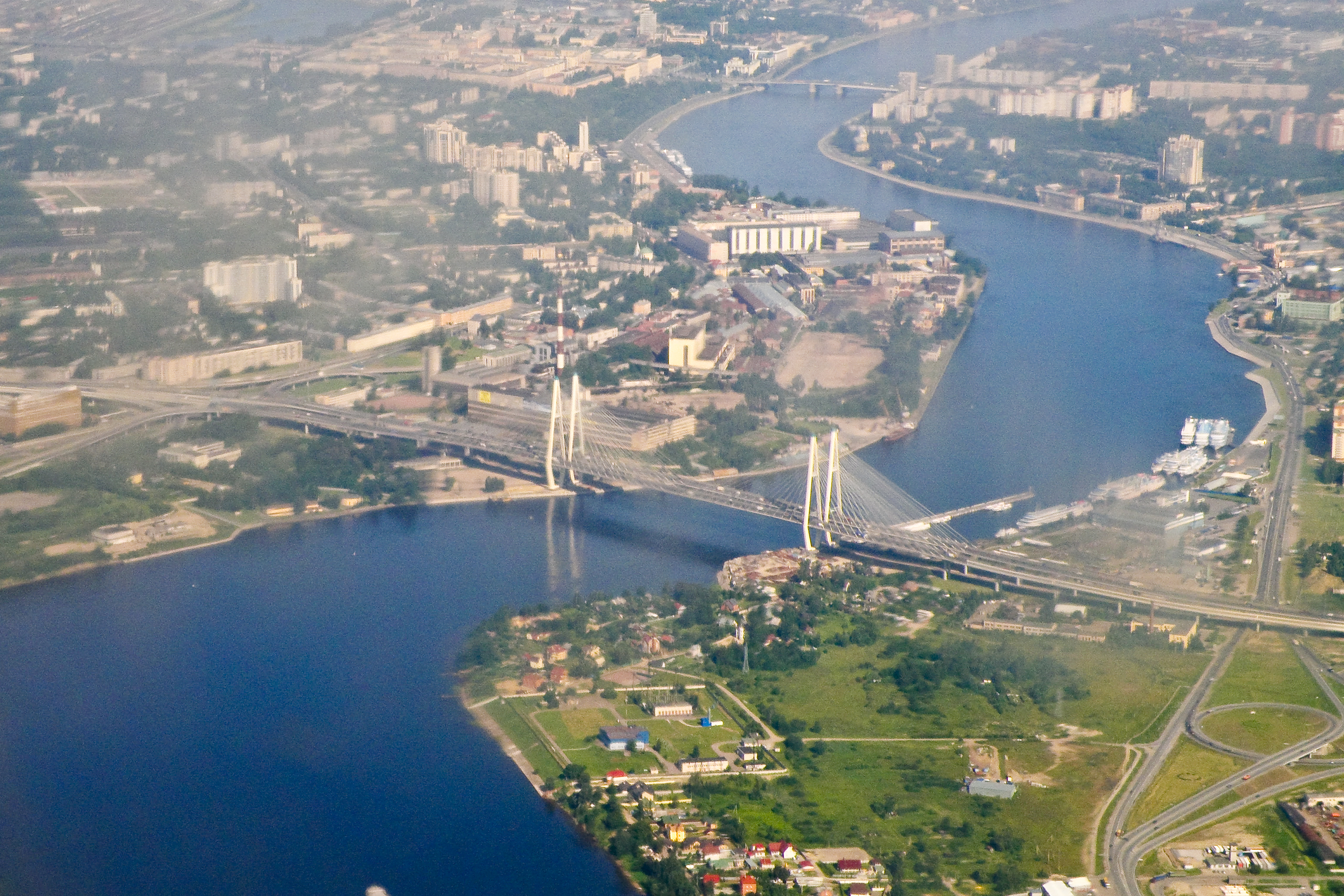
The Bolshoy Obukhovsky Bridge, the only non-bascule bridge over the Neva River among the bridges of Saint Petersburg

The Saint Petersburg Ring Road (Russian: Кольцевая автомобильная дорога вокруг Санкт-Петербурга, romanized: Kol'tsevaya avtomobil'naya doroga vokrug Sankt-Peterburga) is a 142 km (88 mile) orbital freeway encircling Saint Petersburg, Russia. The city's only beltway, it is listed in the Russian road numbering system as federal public highway A-118.

== Construction ==
The need for the construction of a beltway around St Petersburg was first stated in the 1965 General Development Plan of Leningrad. The western segment of the road was planned to be constructed as a causeway forming part of a proposed flood-protection dam in the Gulf of Finland. In late 1979, construction of the dam facilities commenced and by the early 1990s a two-lane road connected the northern shore of the Gulf of Finland with the city of Kronstadt on Kotlin Island. However, lack of financing in the midst of economic turmoil in Russia halted further development of both the dam and the Ring Road project in 1992.

Construction of the Ring Road was resumed in 1998. The first freeway section of the Ring Road – connecting the northern end of the dam, near Gorskaya railway station, with the northern outskirts of St Petersburg in Vyborgsky District – was opened on 26 December 2002. By September 2006, freeway segments of the Ring Road completed the eastern bypass around St Petersburg with grade-separated junctions with the E-18/A-181 route in the northern segment, E-105/R-21 route in the eastern segment, and E-105/M-10 route in the southern segment of the road. The completed part of the Ring Road included the cable-stayed Bolshoy Obukhovsky Bridge, the only non-bascule bridge across the main branch of the Neva River.

An interchange junction near the international Pulkovo Airport was opened in November 2007. By this time, construction of the Ring Road was resulting in a significant boost in land values in the vicinity of the highway and its interchanges.

The south-western and western sections of the Ring Road, including the dam facilities and the intersection with the E-20/A-180 route, were gradually constructed throughout the late 2000s. The six-lane causeway across the Gulf of Finland includes bridges, trestles, man-made islands, and a tunnel under the main shipping channel. After more than two decades of construction, the completed Ring Road was officially opened on 12 August 2011 by the Russian Prime Minister, Vladimir Putin, and the Governor of St Petersburg, Valentina Matvienko, who inaugurated the dam facilities. The St. Petersburg Ring Road was notorious for the delays and budget overspending during its construction.

== General data ==
- Length: 142 km (88 mi)
- Width: 17–32 m (56–105 ft)
- Lanes: 4 to 8
- Bridges and trestles: 105
- Tunnel: 1
- Grade-separated junctions: 26
- Speed limit: 110 km/h (68 mph)

== See also ==
- Moscow Ring Road
- Western Rapid Diameter
