= Obukhov (inhabited locality) =

Obukhov (Russian: Обухов; masculine) or Obukhova (Обухова; feminine) is the name of several rural localities in Russia.

Modern localities

- Obukhov (rural locality), a khutor in Grushevskoye Rural Settlement of Aksaysky District in Rostov Oblast

Alternative names

- Obukhova, alternative name of Obukhovo, a village in Gzhelskoye Rural Settlement of Ramensky District in Moscow Oblast; 55°37′N 38°22′E
- Obukhova, alternative name of Obukhovo, a village in Stepankovskoye Rural Settlement of Shakhovskoy District in Moscow Oblast; 55°58′N 35°28′E
- Obukhova, alternative name of Obukhovo, a village in Radovitskoye Rural Settlement of Shatursky District in Moscow Oblast; 55°12′N 39°45′E
- Obukhova, alternative name of Obukhovo, a village in Krivtsovskoye Rural Settlement of Solnechnogorsky District in Moscow Oblast; 56°9′N 36°55′E
- Obukhova, alternative name of Obukhovo, a selo in Obukhovsky Selsoviet of Pritobolny District in Kurgan Oblast; 55°5′N 65°24′E

== See also ==
- Obukhov No. 4, a rural locality (a khutor) in Bozhkovskoye Rural Settlement of Krasnosulinsky District in Rostov Oblast
- Obukhov No. 7, a rural locality (a khutor) in Bozhkovskoye Rural Settlement of Krasnosulinsky District in Rostov Oblast
