= Obukhovo, Ustyuzhensky District, Vologda Oblast =

Obukhovo Обухово
- Village
- Location within Vologda Oblast Location within Russia
- Coordinates: 58°46′N 36°26′E
- Country: Russia
- Region: Vologda Oblast
- District: Ustyuzhensky District
- Time zone: UTC+3:00

Obukhovo (Russian: Обухово) is a rural locality (a village) in Ustyuzhenskoye Rural Settlement, Ustyuzhensky District, Vologda Oblast, Russia. The population was 15 as of 2002.

== Geography ==
Obukhovo is located 9 km (5.6 mi) south of Ustyuzhna (the district's administrative centre) by road. Shustovo is the nearest rural locality.
