= Obukhovo, Staroselskoye Rural Settlement, Vologodsky District, Vologda Oblast =

Obukhovo Обухово
- Village
- Location within Vologda Oblast Location within Russia
- Coordinates: 59°20′N 39°49′E
- Country: Russia
- Region: Vologda Oblast
- District: Vologodsky District
- Time zone: UTC+3:00

Obukhovo (Russian: Обухово) is a rural locality (a village) in Staroselskoye Rural Settlement, Vologodsky District, Vologda Oblast, Russia. The population was 1 as of 2002.

== Geography ==
The distance to Vologda is 49 km, to Striznevo is 8 km.
