= Obukhovo, Gryazovetsky District, Vologda Oblast =

Obukhovo Обухово
- Village
- Location within Vologda Oblast Location within Russia
- Coordinates: 58°56′N 40°44′E
- Country: Russia
- Region: Vologda Oblast
- District: Gryazovetsky District
- Time zone: UTC+3:00

Obukhovo (Russian: Обухово) is a rural locality (a village) in Sidorovskoye Rural Settlement, Gryazovetsky District, Vologda Oblast, Russia. The population was 8 as of 2002.

== Geography ==
Obukhovo is located 38 km northeast of Gryazovets (the district's administrative centre) by road. Spasskoye is the nearest rural locality.
