= Obukhov (surname) =

Obukhov (Russian: О́бу́хо́в; masculine) or Obukhova (О́бу́хо́ва; feminine) is a Russian surname. Variants of this surname include Abukhov/Abukhova (Абу́хов/Абу́хова), Abukhovich (Абухо́вич), Obukh (О́бух), Obukhovich (Обухо́вич), and Obukhovsky/Obukhovskaya (Обухо́вский/Обухо́вская).

They derive from the nickname "Обух" (Obukh), or "Абух" (Abukh) in dialects with akanye. While the primary meaning of the Russian word "обух" is the dull side of a sharp tool opposite of the cutting side, in some dialects it also has the figurative meaning of dumb, stupid, or stubborn person; one who disobeys.

The following people share this surname:

- Alexander Obukhov (1918–1989), Russian physicist
- Alexander Obukhov, Russian chess grandmaster
- Alexey Obukhov (1937–2022), Russian diplomat
- Boris Obukhov (1891–1937), Soviet naval officer, a victim of Stalin's purges
- Boris Petrovich Obukhov, governor of Pskov Governorate, Russia in 1867–1868
- Dmitri Obukhov, Russian ice hockey player
- Dmitry Obukhov, third-place winner of the Third Open Mathematical Olympiad of the Belarusian-Russian University
- Igor Obukhov (b. 1996), Russian association football player
- Mikhail Obukhov, 1907 interpreter of Zephyr in the ballet The Seasons
- Nadezhda Obukhova (1886–1961), Russian mezzo-soprano
- Nikolai Obukhov (1892–1954), Russian composer
- Oleksiy Obukhov, Ukrainian bronze medalist in 1997 World Weightlifting Championships – Men's 99 kg
- Platon Obukhov (b. 1968), Russian journalist, writer, translator, and painter
- Pyotr Obukhov, leader of the construction crew which Karl Blank, Russian architect, joined
- Sergei Obukhov (b. 1958), Russian politician
- Sergey Obukhov (b. 1974), Russian bandy player
- Viktor Obukhov (1898–1975), Soviet general
- Vladimir Obukhov (b. 1992), Russian association football player
- Yelena Obukhova, bronze medalist in women's high jump at the 1986 World Junior Championships in Athletics
- Yevgeny Obukhov (1921–1944), Hero of the Soviet Union
- Yevgeniya Obukhova, Miss Russia 2007 contestant
