= Obukhovo, Vladimir Oblast =

Obukhovo Обухово
- Village
- Location within Vladimir Oblast Location within Russia
- Coordinates: 56°22′N 39°21′E
- Country: Russia
- Region: Vladimir Oblast
- District: Kolchuginsky District
- Time zone: UTC+3:00

Obukhovo (Russian: Обухово) is a rural locality (a village) in Ilyinskoye Rural Settlement, Kolchuginsky District, Vladimir Oblast, Russia. The population was 14 as of 2010. There are 2 streets.

== Geography ==
Obukhovo is located 18 km north of Kolchugino (the district's administrative centre) by road. Krasny Ruchey is the nearest rural locality.
