= Obukhovsky, Astrakhan Oblast =

Obukhovsky Обуховский
- Settlement
- Location within Astrakhan Oblast Location within Russia
- Coordinates: 45°49′N 48°08′E
- Country: Russia
- Region: Astrakhan Oblast
- District: Kamyzyaksky District
- Time zone: UTC+4:00

Obukhovsky (Russian: Обуховский) is a rural locality (a settlement) in Karaulinsky Selsoviet, Kamyzyaksky District, Astrakhan Oblast, Russia. The population was 97 as of 2010. There are 2 streets.

== Geography ==
Obukhovsky is located 37 km south of Kamyzyak (the district's administrative centre) by road. Kirovsky is the nearest rural locality.
