= Obukhovo, Sheksninsky District, Vologda Oblast =

Obukhovo Обухово
- Village
- Location within Vologda Oblast Location within Russia
- Coordinates: 59°14′N 38°24′E
- Country: Russia
- Region: Vologda Oblast
- District: Sheksninsky District
- Time zone: UTC+3:00

Obukhovo (Russian: Обухово) is a rural locality (a village) in Nifantovskoye Rural Settlement, Sheksninsky District, Vologda Oblast, Russia. The population was 39 as of 2002. There are 3 streets.

== Geography ==
Obukhovo is located 10 km northwest of Sheksna (the district's administrative centre) by road. Dyakonovskoye is the nearest rural locality.
