= Obukhovsky Bridge =

Bridge in Saint Petersburg, Russia

Coordinates: 59.921694°N 30.317812°E

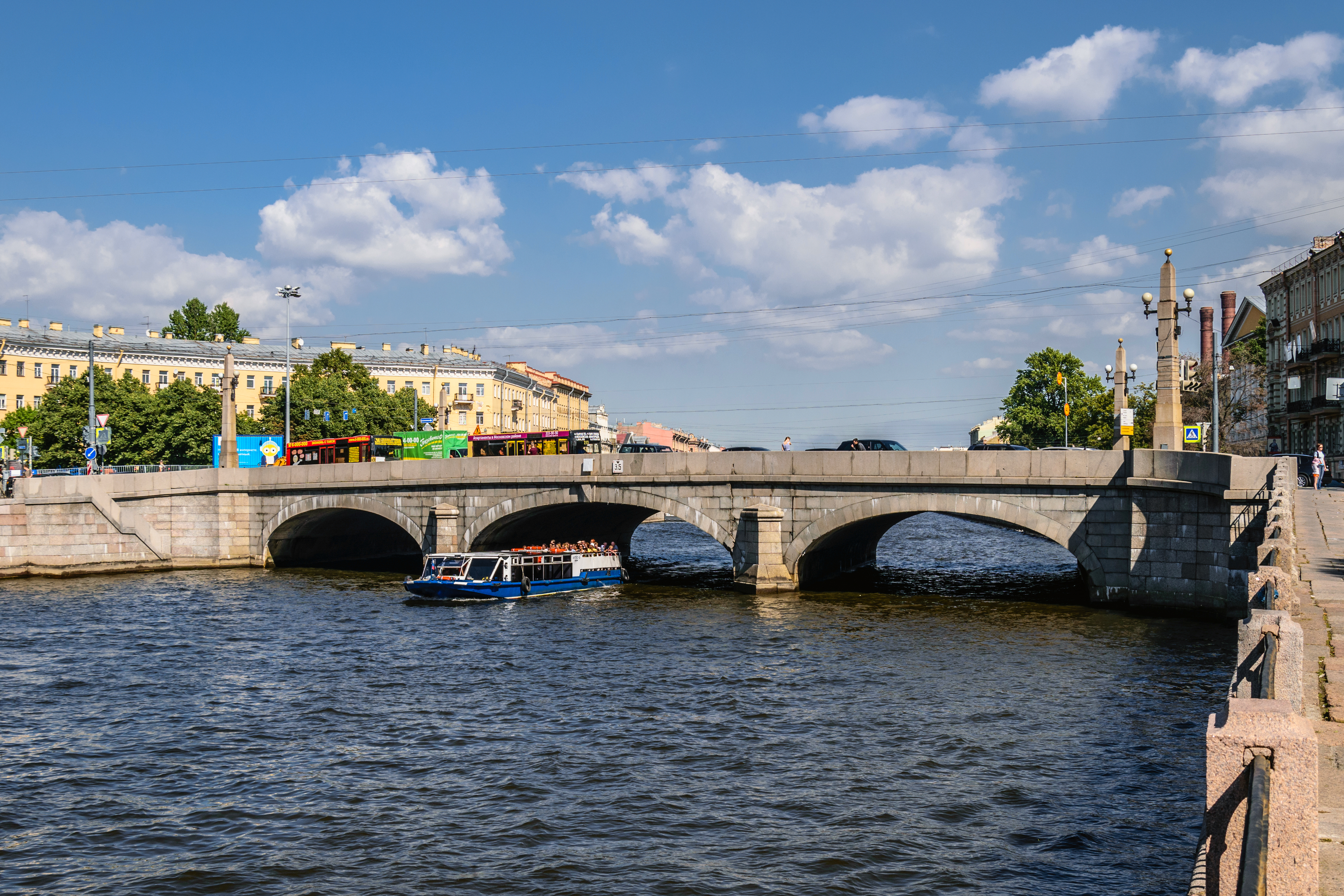
Obukhovsky Bridge

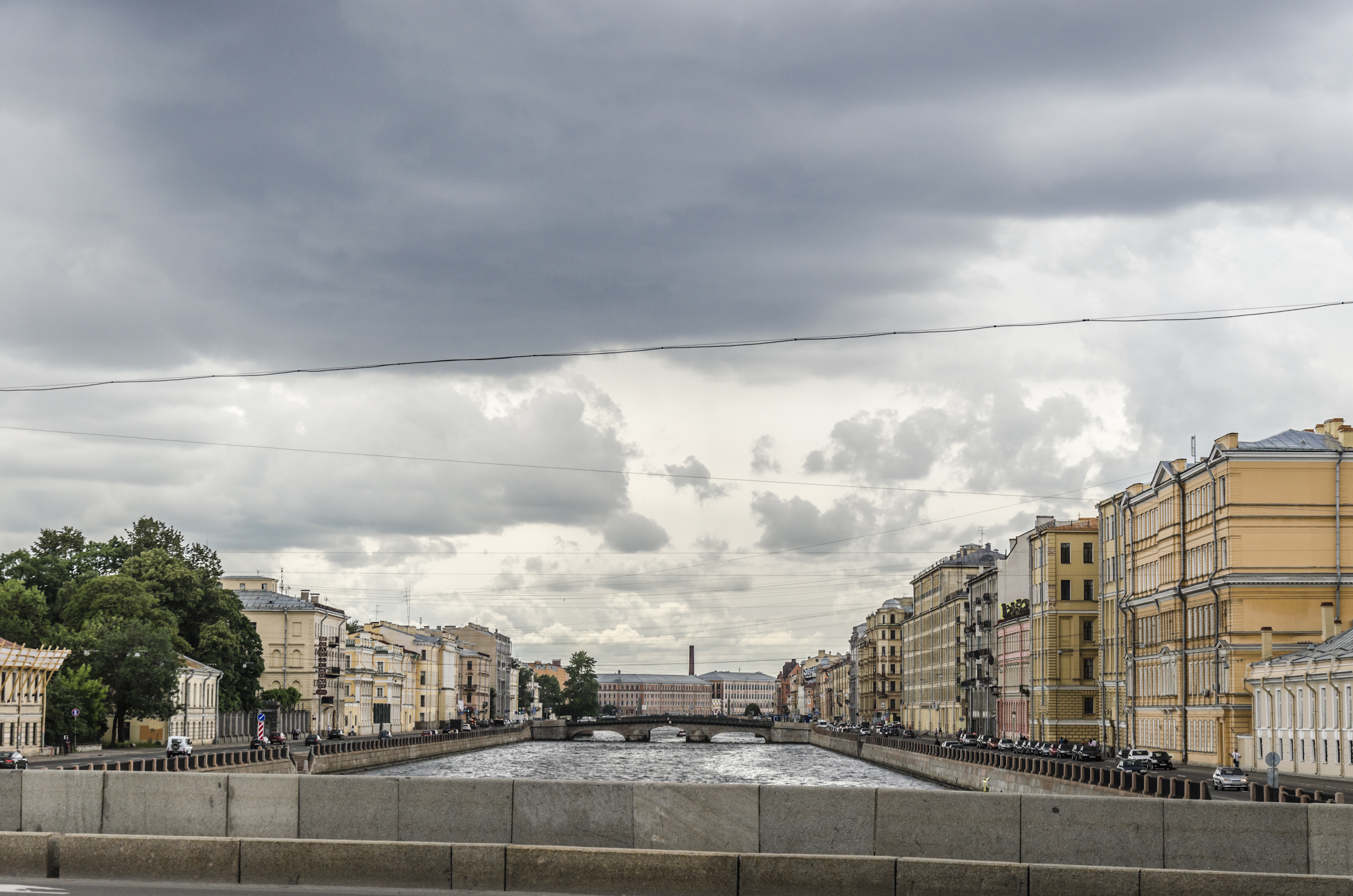
Fontanka River from Obukhovsky Bridge

The Obukhovsky or Obukhov Bridge (Russian: Обуховский мост) is a bridge in St. Petersburg, Russia. It carries Moskovsky Prospekt over the Fontanka River.

It was originally built as a stone bridge in 1785–86 to replace a 1717 wooden bridge, and was named after the builder. It was substantially modified in 1865 and again in 1938–1940.

== In literature ==
The bridge is mentioned at the end of Nikolai Gogol's short story, "The Overcoat". The main character, Akaky Akakievich —or a certain clerk— is rumored to appear as a ghost near the Kalinkin Bridge, searching for his stolen overcoat, and after the story's denouement is seen walking towards the Obukhov Bridge and vanishing into the darkness of the night.
