= Obukhovo, Noginsky District, Moscow Oblast =

Obukhovo Обухово
- Work settlement
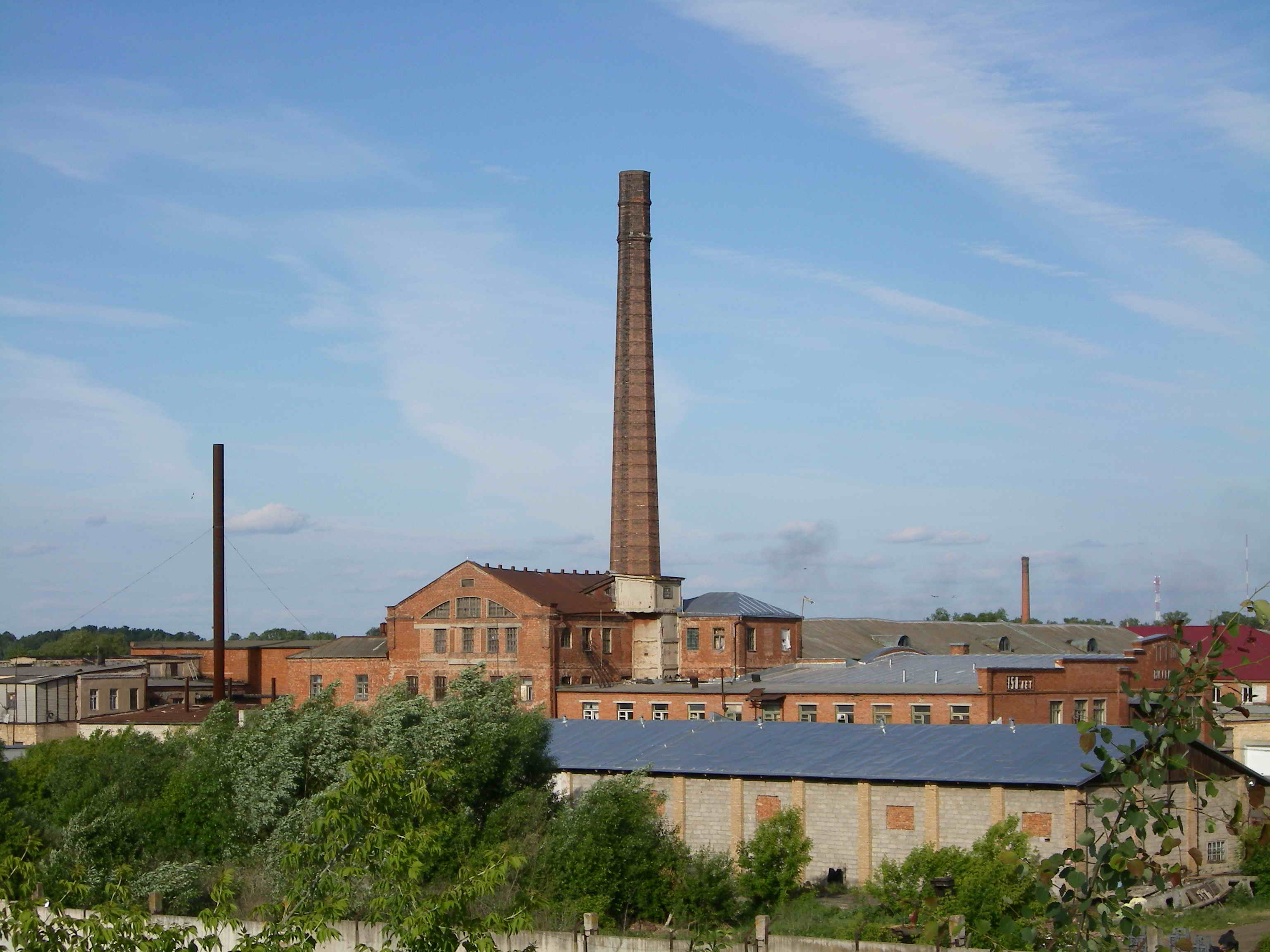
- Former Obukhovo Lenin Carpet Factory

- Flag Coat of arms
- Interactive map of Obukhovo
- Location of Obukhovo Obukhovo (Moscow Oblast)
- Coordinates: 55°49′42″N 38°17′07″E
- Country: Russia
- Federal subject: Moscow Oblast
- Administrative district: Noginsky District
- Founded: 1573

Government
  - Body: Council of Deputies
  - Head: Nikolay Sushchenko
- Elevation: 135 m (443 ft)

Population (2010 Census)
  - Total: 9,630
  - Estimate (2025): 8,570 (−11%)

Municipal status
  - Municipal district: Noginsky Municipal District
  - Urban settlement: Obukhovo Urban Settlement
- Time zone: UTC+3 (MSK)
- Postal code: 142440
- Dialing code: +7 49651
- OKTMO ID: 46639158051
- Urban-type settlement Day: One of the Saturdays in August
- Website: www.obuhovo-mo.ru

Obukhovo (Russian: Обу́хово) is an urban locality (a work settlement) in Noginsky District of Moscow Oblast, Russia, located 26 kilometers (16 mi) east from Moscow. Population: 8,689 (2021 census); 9,630 (2010 census); 10,746 (2002 census); 11,359 (1989 Soviet census).

== Overview ==
The settlement is divided into two parts by the M7 auto route.

Two rivers flow through Obukhovo: the Klyazma and the Shalovka (a tributary of the Klyazma).

Obukhovo used to be a famous center of textile industry. Its core enterprises were a sand pit and two carpet factories. Bankruptcy of the factories led to their closure in 2002.

== History ==
Obukhovo was first mentioned in a book about Moscow region written in 1573–1574. In 1708, English businessman Andrew Stales built a powder mill in Obukhovo, which later manufactured gunpowder. In the first half of the 19th century the powder mill underwent bankruptcy and was sold on auction.

In 1775, Obukhovskaya suburb was organized near the powder mill.

In 1852, Anisim Tyulyaev built a clothing factory and in 1857 Mikhail Brunov built a carpet factory in Obukhovskaya suburb. After the October Revolution, both factories were nationalized. In 1958, the factories merged under the name of "Lenin Carpet and Clothing Enterprise of Obukhovo".

On 21 May 1928, the settlement was granted urban-type settlement status and renamed Obukhovo.

In 2002, "The Carpets of Obukhovo" Joint Stock Company (former "Lenin carpet and cloth combine of Obukhovo") went bankrupt and in 2006 it was liquidated.

== Demographics ==
Year of census	Population
1775	281
1816	390
1897	1,542
1925	3,867
1929	3,905
1957	7,800
1989	11,359
2002	10,746
2010	9,630

== Sports ==
The settlement is also well known as one of the bandy centres of Russia. Many players from Obukhovo has become World Champions. Sportivny Klub Obukhovo is the only club outside the highest division of Russian Bandy Super League to have an artificial ice. Obukhovo has hosted several Youth World Championships. In February 2011 it was for Girls-17, in December 2011 for Boys-23, in which the Russian team was victorious after beating Sweden after extra-time in the final and in 2013 the same tournament.

The other sections of Sportivny Klub Obukhovo are association football, volleyball, judo, and field hockey.

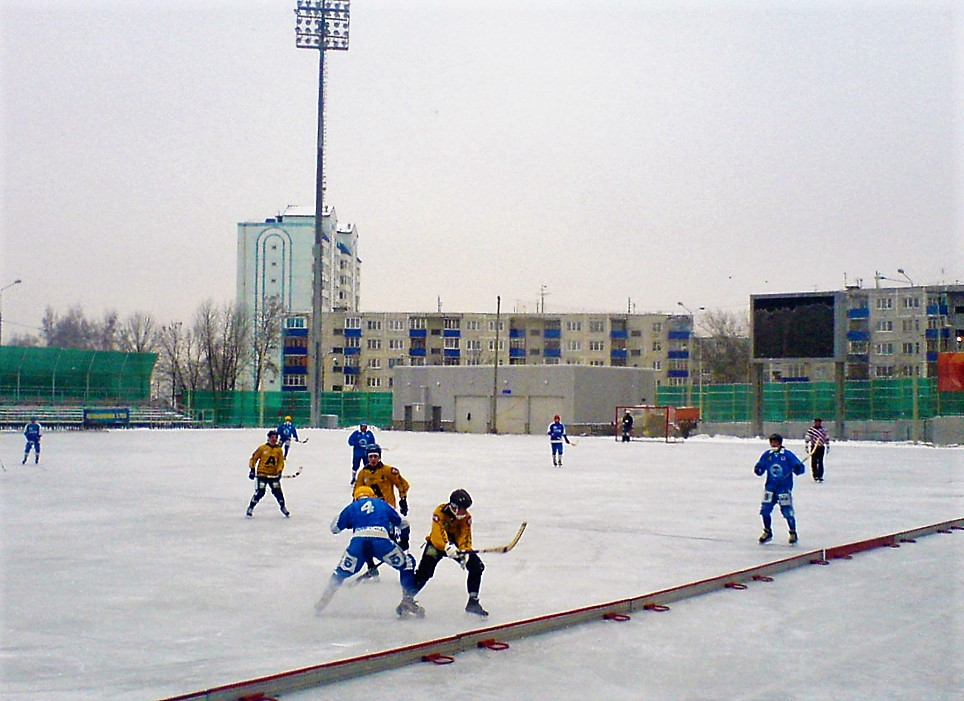
The bandy stadium in Obukhovo

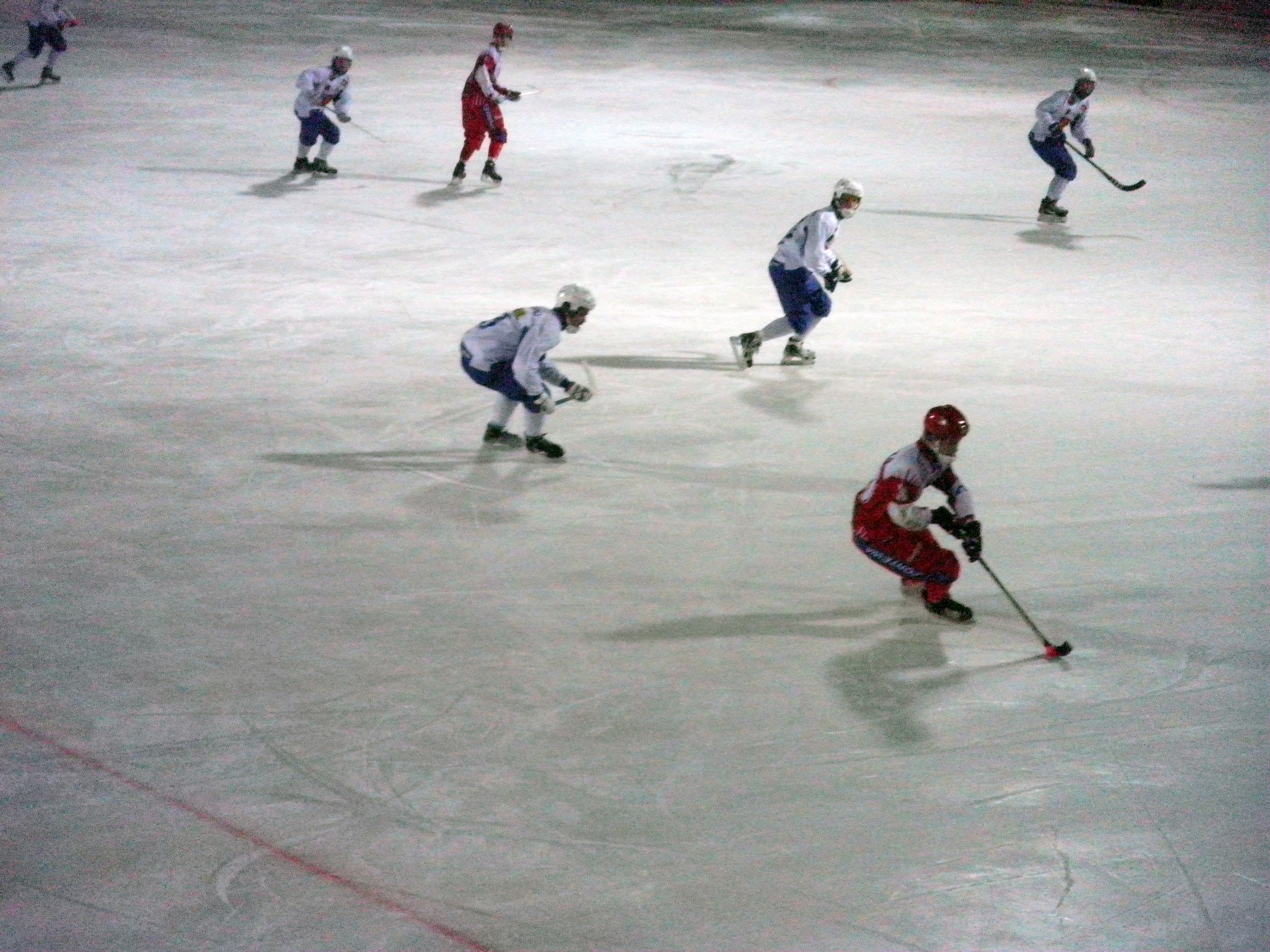
Youth-23 Bandy World Championship 2011
