= The Unknown War (book) =

The Unknown War (Belarusian military history book)
- Author: Hienadz Sahanovich
- Language: Belarusian
- Genre: Military history, History
- Publisher: Navuka i Tehnika
- Publication date: 1995
- Publication place: Belarus
- Media type: Print (Hardcover)
- ISBN: 5-343-01637-5
- OCLC: 36221525

The Unknown War is a military history book written by Hienadz Sahanovich. It describes the events of the war between Tsardom of Russia and the Polish–Lithuanian Commonwealth in 1654–67. The war has become known as a part of the "Deluge", a series of military conflicts that overwhelmed the Polish–Lithuanian Commonwealth in the middle of the 17th century which included the Khmelnytsky Uprising, the Swedish invasion, and the Russian invasion among others.

== Importance ==
The book became one of the first in-depth researches of military actions during the Russo-Polish War (1654–67) which took place in the lands of the modern-day Belarus. The topic of armed conflicts between Russia and historical predecessors of the former Soviet Republics was largely forbidden in the times of the Soviet Union (this explains the book title). The book was released in 1995, four years after disintegration of the ex-USSR.

The Unknown War focuses on war events in the Grand Duchy of Lithuania, one of two integral parts of the Polish–Lithuanian Commonwealth (often generalized under the name of Poland). The dominant portion of lands that made up the Grand Duchy in the 17th century are today united in the Republic of Belarus, and hence, create a subject of historic analysis for Belarusian historians like Hienadz Sahanovich.

The book describes the following historical figures among others:

- Janusz Radziwill, Great Hetman of Lithuania
- Boguslaw Radziwill, Governor of the Duchy of Prussia
- Pawel Jan Sapieha, Great Hetman of Lithuania
- Tsar Alexis of Russia
- John II Casimir Vasa, King of the Polish–Lithuanian Commonwealth
- George II Rakoczi, Prince of Transylvania
- Magnus De la Gardie, Swedish governor of occupied territories
- Philip Abukhovich, Voivode of Smolensk
- Denis Murashka, commander of Belarusian (Lithuanian) guerrillas
- Wincenty Gosiewski, Field Hetman of Lithuania
- Ivan Khovansky, duke and voivode in the Russian army
- Alexei Trubeskoy, duke and voivode in the Russian army

== Controversy ==
The book is sometimes criticized for putting excessive blame for casualties among the population of the Grand Duchy of Lithuania on hostilities committed by the Russian army (which operated in alliance with the Ukrainian Cossacks for the most time of the war). For example, the book says that population loss on the Belarusian lands exceeded 50% (for comparison, population loss during World War II in Belarus, one of the world worst hit territories, was about 25%).

However, these numbers do not differentiate between people who died as a result of military action, and victims of the Black Death which ran through Europe at about that time. Proponents of the book usually respond that the Black Death had a minimal effect of the Polish–Lithuanian Commonwealth in the 17th century.

Another argument against the data used in the book tables is that they often refer to the period between 1648 and 1667, and thus additionally account for population loss caused by the Khmelnytsky Uprising of 1648-1654 and not associated with the Russian invasion.

Example of a table from the book:

4. Population Losses In The Belarusian Pavets in 1648-1667*
Pavet (county)	Number Of People		Population Loss
Pavet (county)	Prior the War	After the War	In Absolut Terms	In Relative Terms
Hrodna	174,398	115,323	59,075	33,9%
Braslaw	39,291	16,978	22,313	56.8%
Ashmyany	231,794	99,034	114,760	53.7%
Lida	83,020	62,536	20,484	24.7%
Vawkavysk	70,826	49,913	20,913	29.5%
Slonim	77,154	62,523	14,631	18,9%
Navahradak	288,743	166,133	122,610	42.5%
Brest	283,185	146,841	136,344	48.1%
Pinsk	162,834	92,371	70,463	43.3%
Mensk	181,244	67,288	113,956	62.9%
Mazyr	36,932	14,982	21,950	59.4%
Rechytsa	30,394	11,804	18,590	61.2%
Polatsk	162,478	40,930	121,498	74.8%
Vitebsk	70,245	26,624	43,621	62.1%
Orsha	473,200	145,015	328,185	69.3%
Mstsislaw	96,383	27,540	68,843	71.4%

* The table is based on the data provided by Vasil Mialeshka

== Chapters ==
The book consists of the following chapters:

- Preface
- The Eve Of War
- Invasion
- Under The Rule Of "Liberators"
- The Last Campaign Of Radziwill
- "The Sovereign Foray" of 1655
- Around The Truce of Vilno
- Occupiers And Guerrillas
- Breakthrough
- Wasted Chances
- Andrusovo
- "To Oblivion And Forgetfulness"?
- Zusamenfassung
- Sources And Researches
- Addition
  - Demographic Tables
  - Biographies

== The author ==
Hienadz Sahanovic (sometimes spelled as Gienadz Saganovich) is a Belarusian historian specialized in research of the Belarusian Middle Ages, history of the Grand Duchy of Lithuania. He is also known for his books Defending His Motherland. Kanstantin Astrozhski and Ten Centuries Of The Belarusian History (co-written with Uladzimir Arlow).
