= Navigation Pass S-1 of Saint Petersburg Dam =

Coordinates: 59°59′26.18″N 29°41′42.68″E

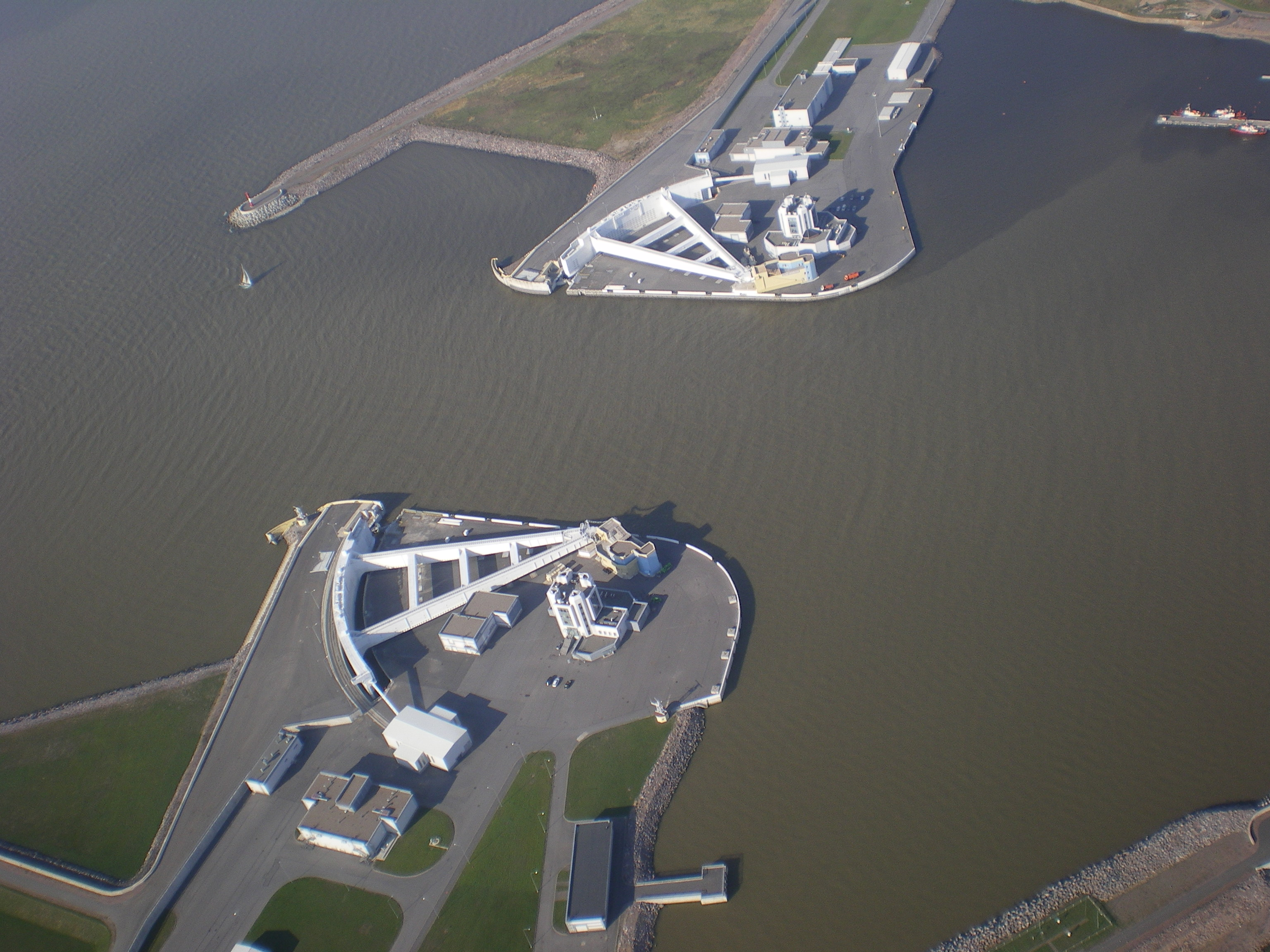
Overall view, September 2014.

The Navigation Pass S-1 of Saint Petersburg Dam is a storm surge barrier in the eastern part of the Finnish Gulf to the south of the island of Kotlin, Russia. It is part of a waterway from the Baltic Sea to Saint Petersburg located at eastern end of Neva Bay. The scheme of S-1 is similar to the Maeslantkering barrier in the Netherlands and consists of two submersible caissons with dimensions 125×22 metres, which are used to close the navigable channel and thus stop storm tides from proliferating into Neva Bay. The channel is 200 metres wide and 16 metres deep. The Saint Petersburg Ring Road crosses it via an underwater tunnel.

The construction of the S-1 began in 1984. The S-1 gates were commissioned for exploitation in the middle of 2011. Their first use for the city protection against storm surges happened on 27 November of the same year.

== Gallery ==
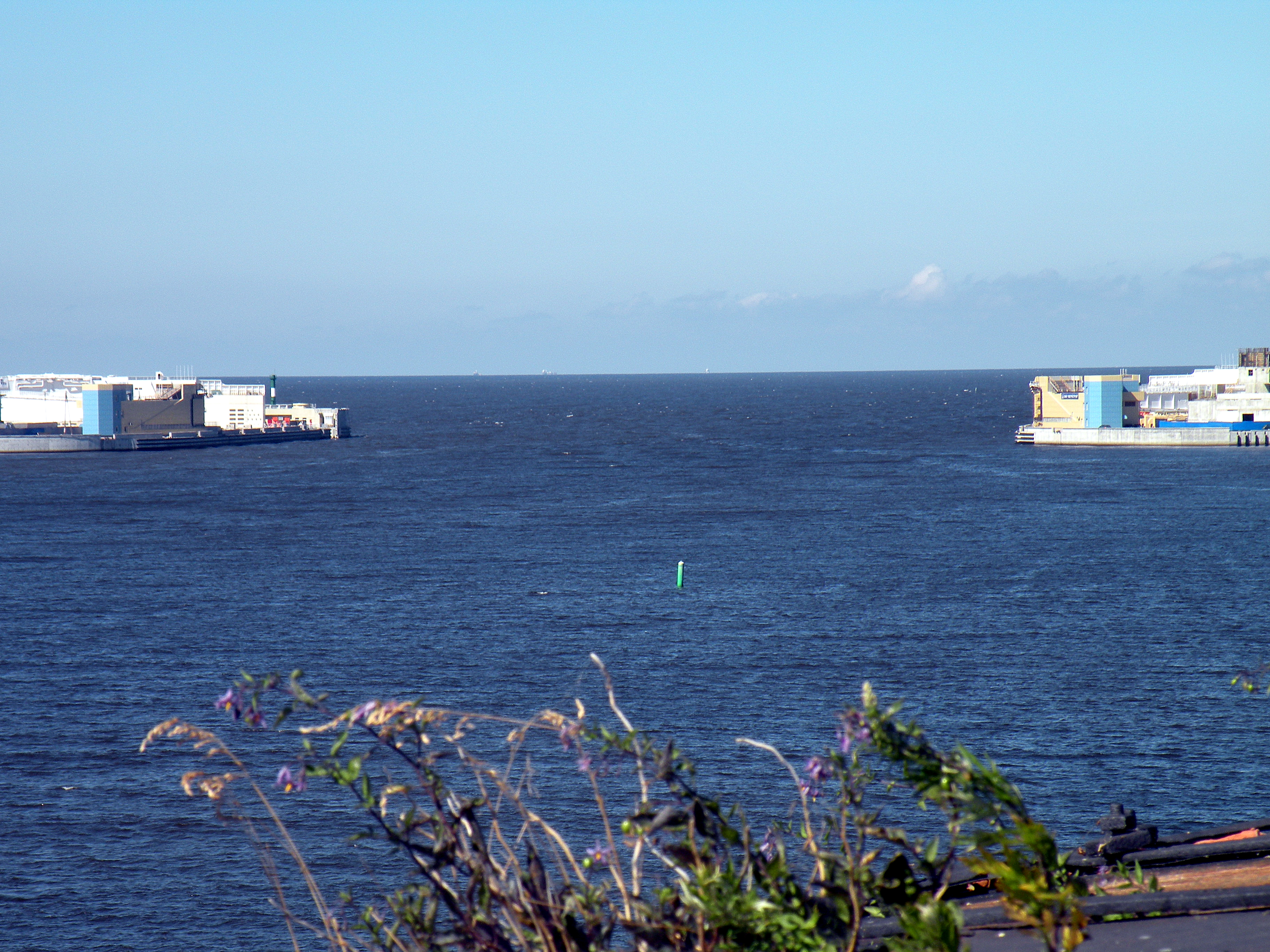
The view of the barrier from the east in June 2011.

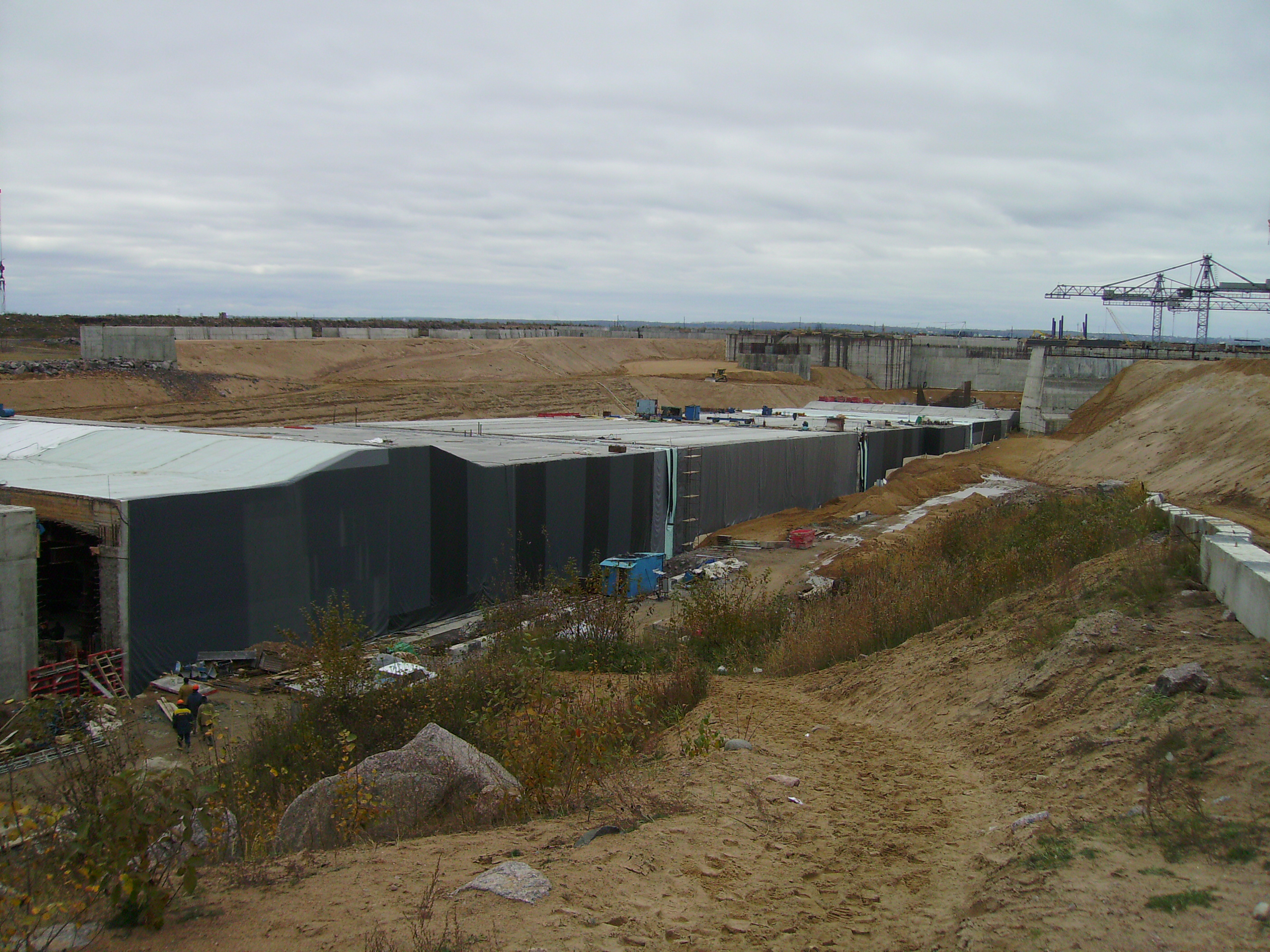
Construction of the auto tunnel. 14.10.2007

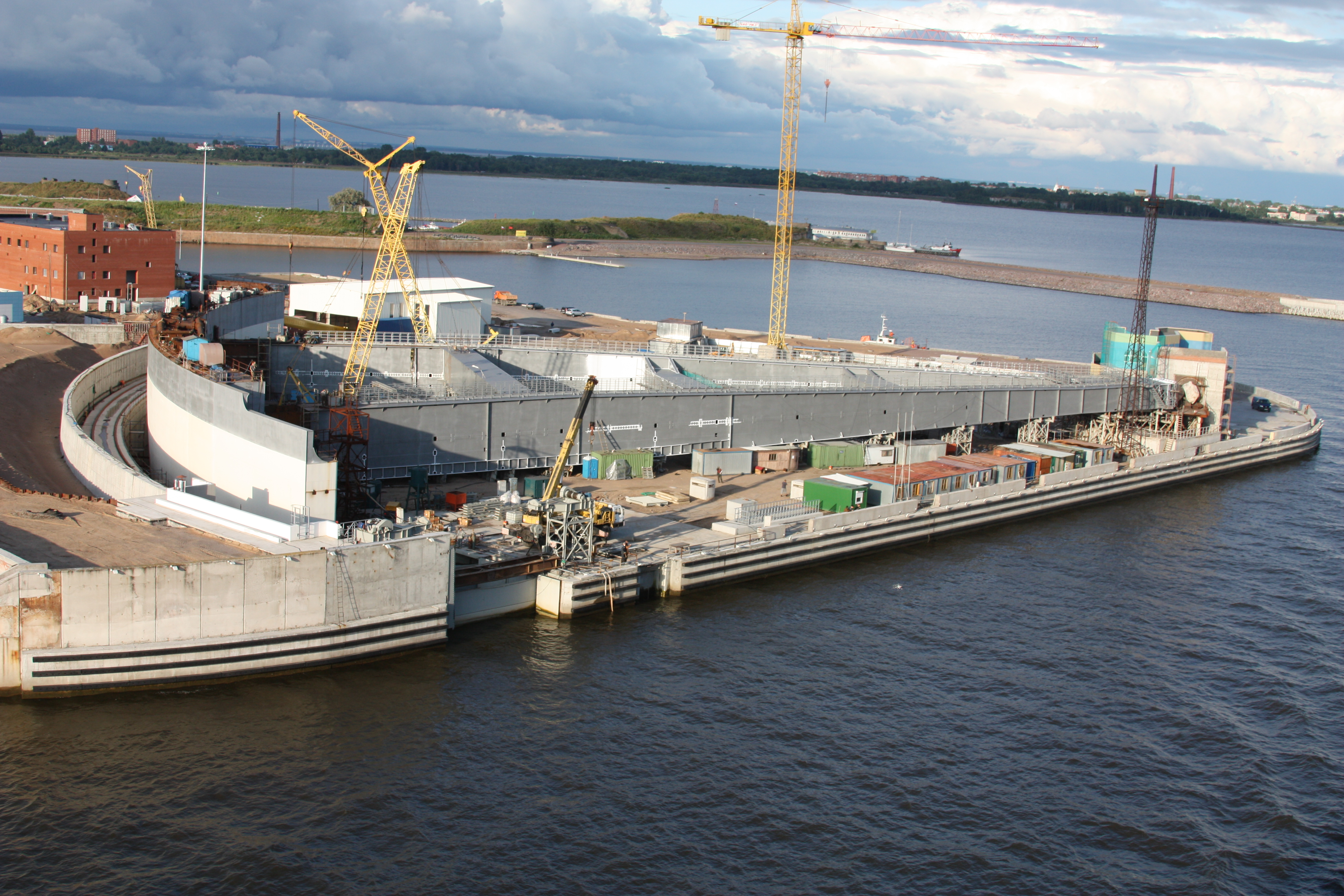
The view on S-1 gate in 2009, two years before their completion.

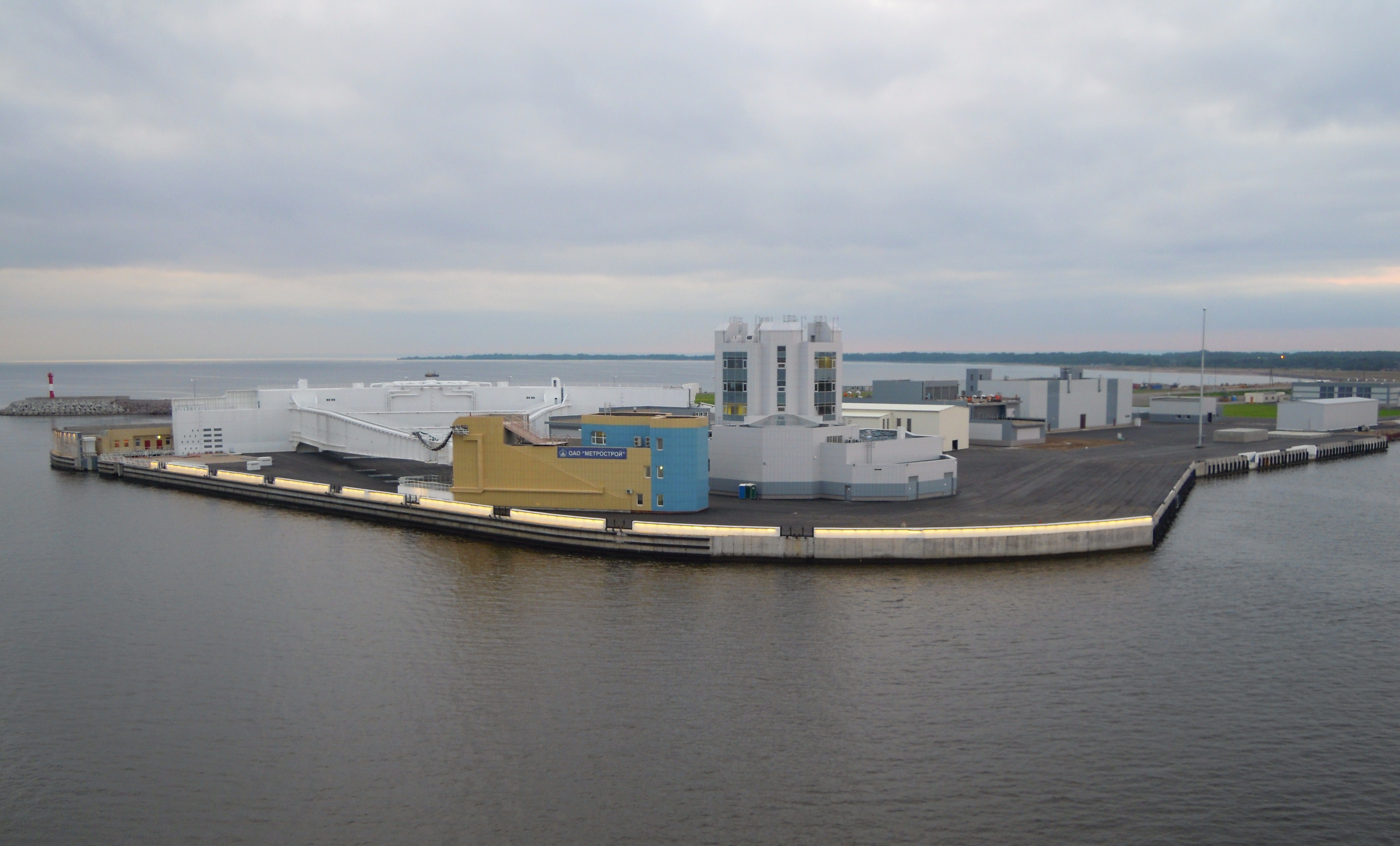
Side view

== See also ==
- Maeslantkering
