= Floods in Saint Petersburg =

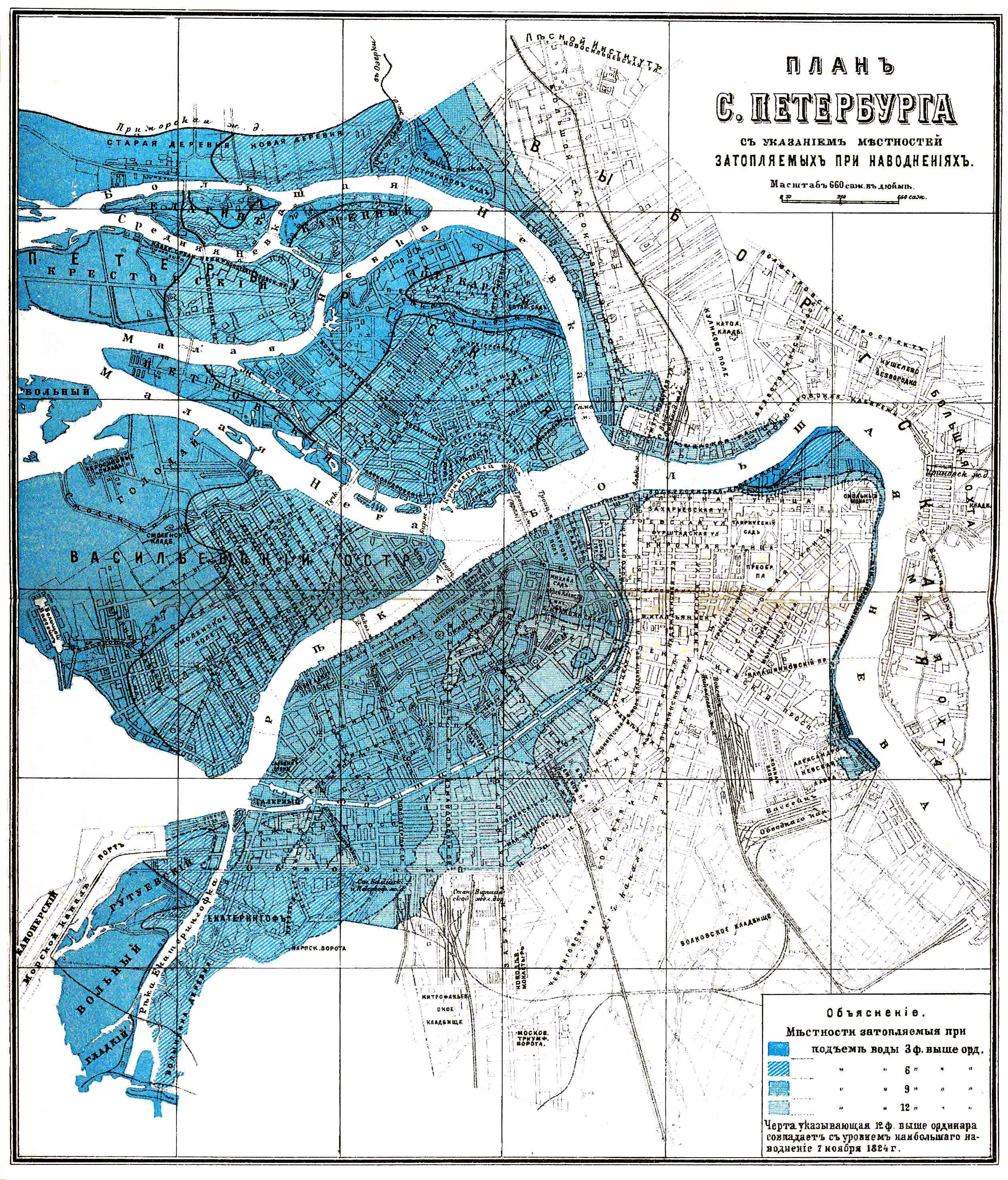
A map of easily flooded areas of St. Petersburg from Brockhaus and Efron Encyclopedic Dictionary of 1907.

Floods in Saint Petersburg refer to a rise of water on the territory of St. Petersburg, a major city in Russia and its former capital. They are usually caused by the overflow of the delta of Neva River and surging water in the eastern part of Neva Bay but sometimes caused by melting snow. Floods are registered when the water rises above 160 cm with respect to a gauge at the Saint Petersburg Mining Institute. More than 300 floods have occurred since the city was founded in 1703.

The construction of Saint Petersburg Dam, started in 1978 and completed in 2011, is expected to protect the city from devastating floods. The dam is the last completed part of the Saint Petersburg Ring Road. Its first use to hold back the incoming Baltic water into Neva bay took place 28 November 2011 and had resulted in decrease of water rise to 1.3 MASL, that is below flood level equal to 1.6 masl, which prevented the 309th flood in the history of the city and saved some 1.3 billion roubles of possible damage.

== Causes ==
Floods in St. Petersburg are caused by several factors. Cyclones, originating in the Baltic Sea with a prevalence of west winds, induce a "slow" matched Kelvin wave to rise and move towards the delta of Neva River where it meets the natural river flow moving in the opposite direction. The water level rises because of the shallowness of Neva Bay, flatness of its bottom and the narrowing of the Gulf of Finland near the delta. Seiches, onsets and another factors also contribute to the floods. Besides flooding as a result of storm surges, in 1903, 1921 and 1956 floods were caused by the melting of snow.

== History ==
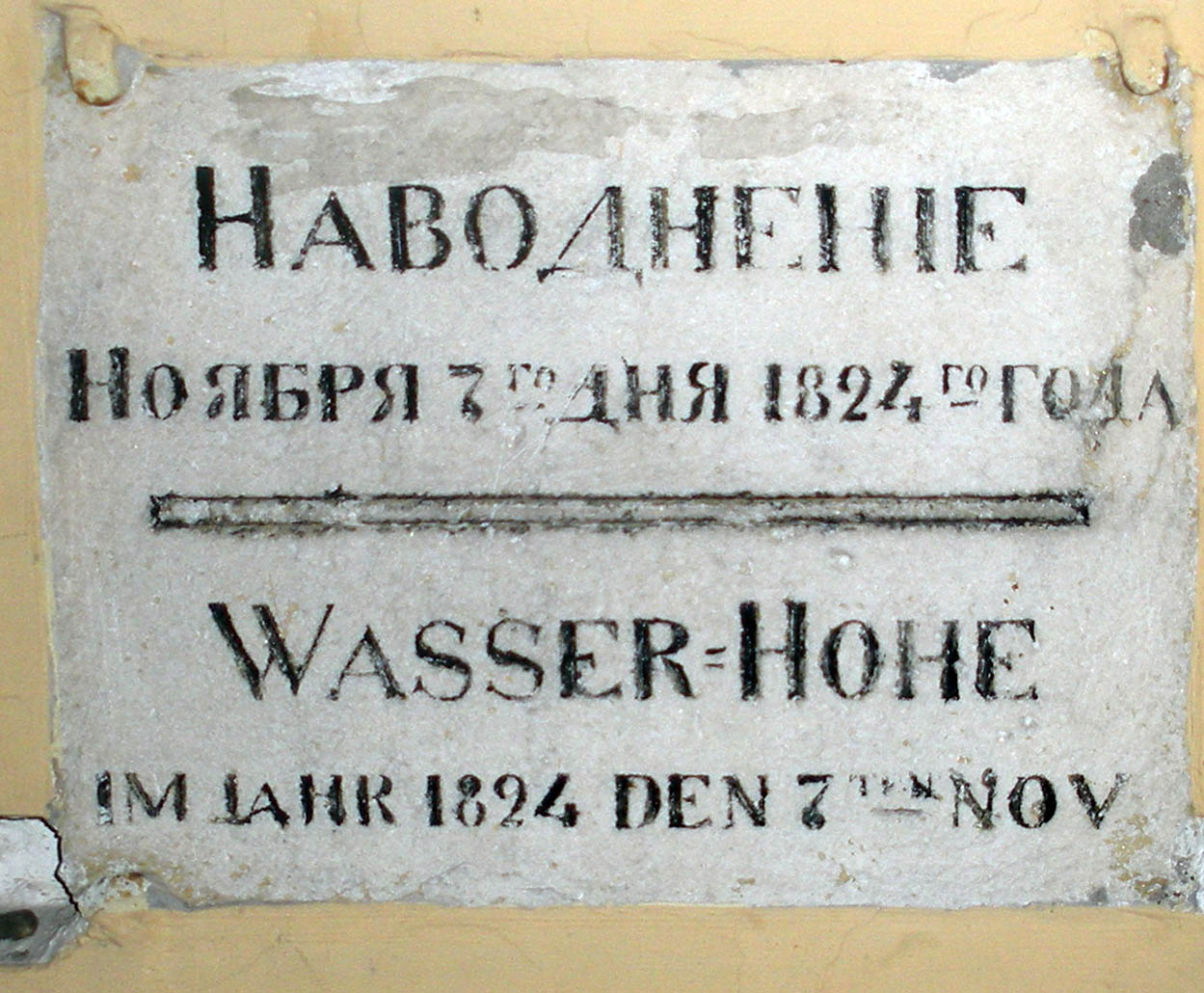
A sign of the heaviest flood in St. Petersburg (1824) at the intersection of the Cadet line and the Bolshoi Prospekt of Vasilievsky Island

Prior to the founding of St. Petersburg in 1703, the largest flood occurred in 1691. Swedish annals report that the water covered the entire area of the present St. Petersburg by 25 feet (7.6 meters). Knowing about frequent floods from the locals, the Swedes laid the fortress Nyenschantz and the city of Nyen away from the delta upstream of the Neva River, at the confluence of the river Ohta to Neva.

The first flood in St. Petersburg city occurred 3 months after its founding, on the night of 19 to 20 August 1703. The water rose more than 2 meters. The water rose much higher on 20 September 1706, which in his letter to Alexander Menshikov, Peter I described as "the west-south-west wind brought the flood undescribed before. In my offices, it stood 21 inches above the floor, and people traveled by boats through the city streets. Yet it did not last long, less than 3 hours. And it was amusing to see people on the roofs and trees... Water was high, but didn't cause much harm ".

Engineering measures were instituted in the early 18th century, and the central part of the city was flooded by only 130–150 cm. Floods are registered in St. Petersburg when water rises above 160 cm at the level gauge at the Saint Petersburg Mining Institute; floods up to 210 cm are considered dangerous, up to 299 cm very dangerous and above 300 cm catastrophic. Of the 324 floods in the history of St. Petersburg, three were catastrophic.

Most floods occur in between September and December. Between 1703 and 2003, 324 floods were recorded with the height above 160 cm, of which 210 were higher than 210 cm. Some years have had several floods (five in 1752), and there are periods in which no flooding occurred (e.g. 1744–1752).

== Largest floods ==
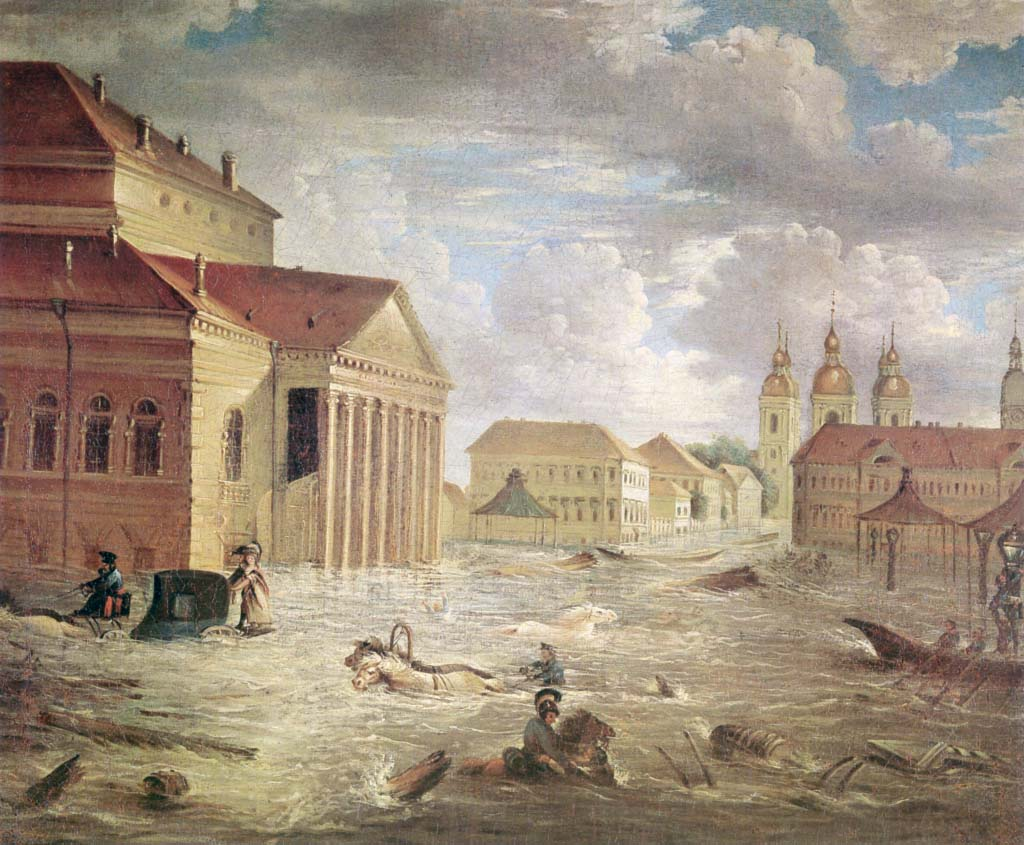
19 November 1824, in front of Bolshoi Theatre

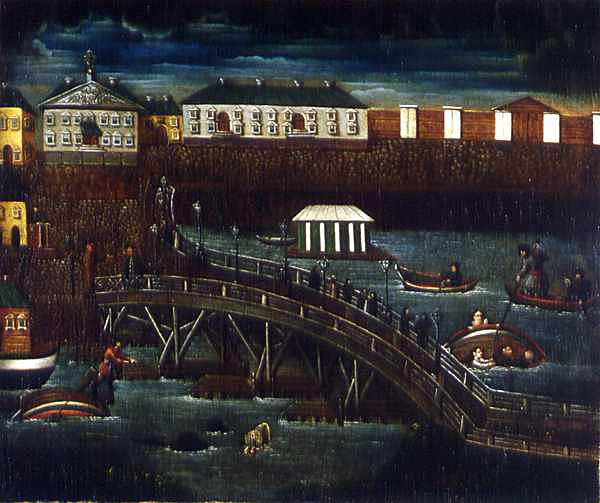
19 November 1824

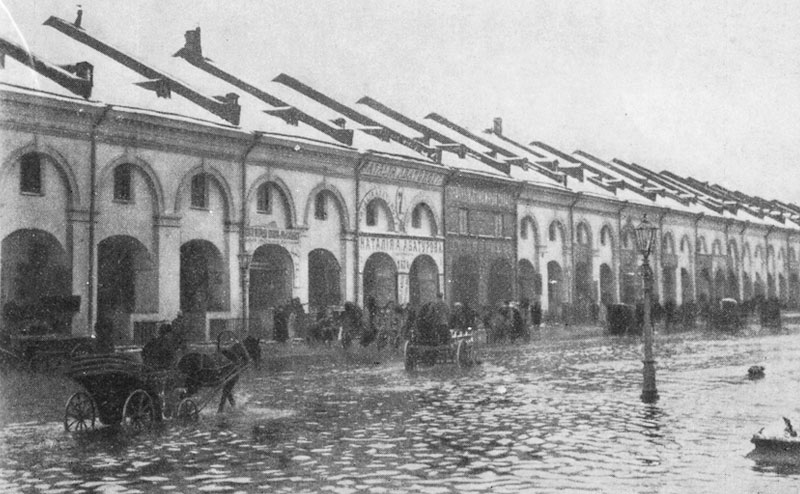
Sadovaya Street near the former Nikolsky Market, 15 November 1903

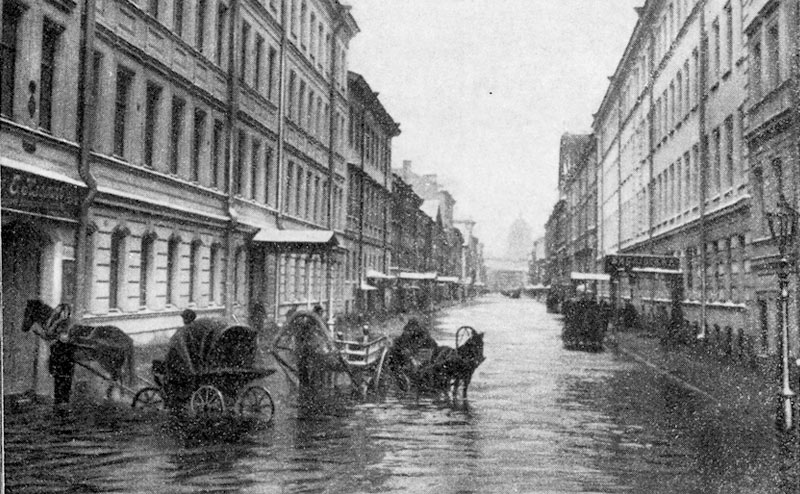
Bolshaya Podyacheskaya Street, 25 November 1903

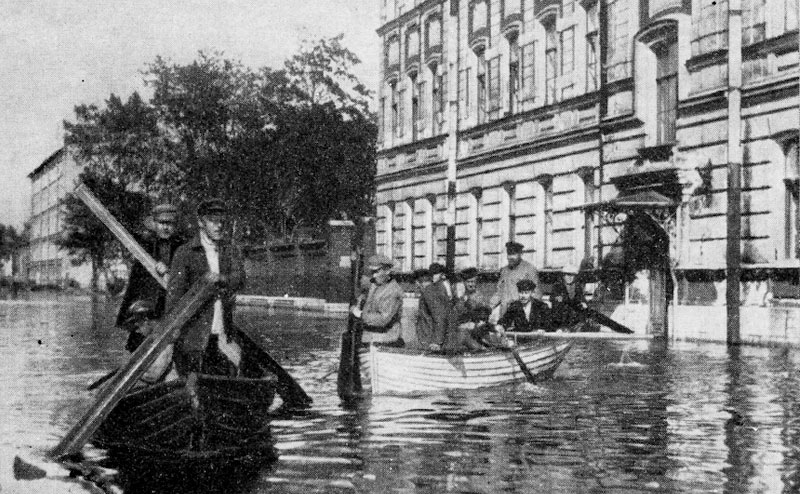
Boat transportation over Vasilievsky Island during the flood of 23 September 1924

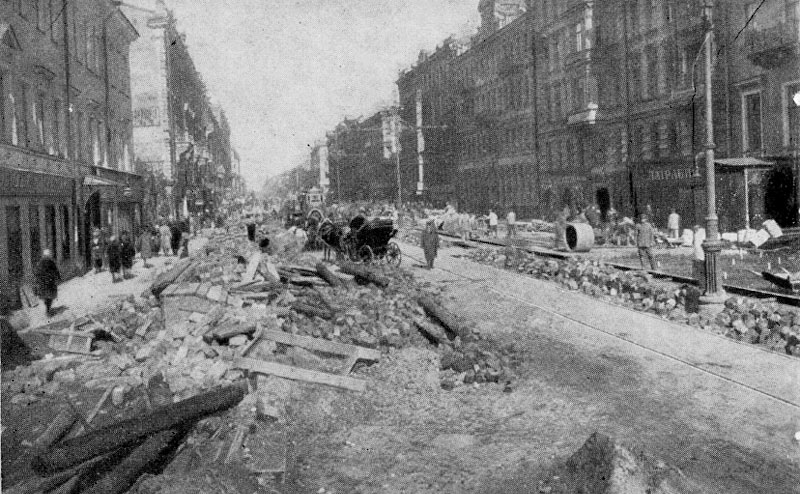
Vladimirsky Avenue after the flood of 1924

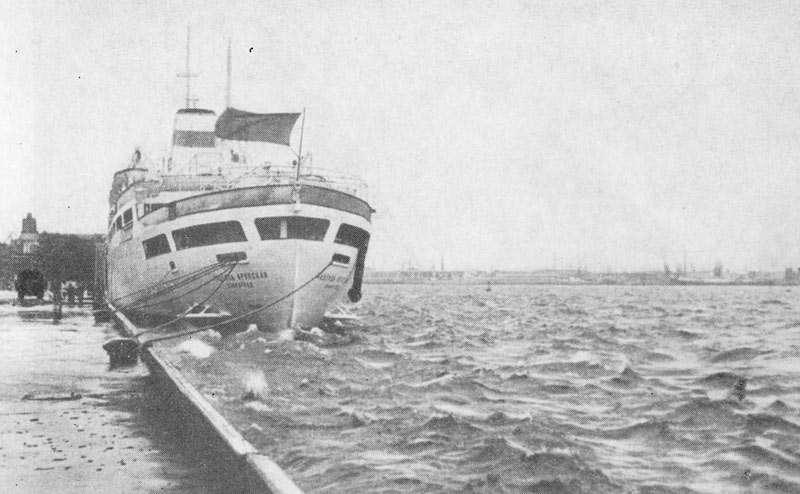
A pier during the flood of 18 October 1967

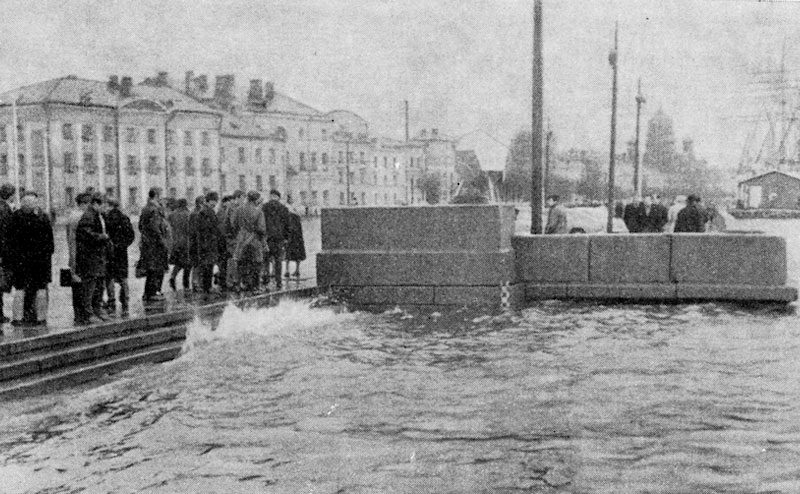
Near the Mining Institute on 18 October 1967

The following table lists the 50 largest floods since 1703. The largest flood occurred in 1824 and killed several hundred people. This flood inspired the poem The Bronze Horseman by Alexander Pushkin.

A recent large flood (239 cm) occurred on 8–9 January 2005 caused by the cyclone Erwin. Six metro stations were closed. There were three floods in 2008, all below 200 centimeters.

	Chronological No.	Date (New style)	Water level cm	Peak hour
1	84	19 November 1824	421	14:00
2	210	23 September 1924	380	19:15
3	71	9 September 1777	321	morning
4	244	15 October 1955	293	20:45
5	264	29 September 1975	281	4:00
6	39	22 October 1752	280	10:00
7	9	2 October 1723	272	–
8	14	1 November 1726	270	–
9	183	13 November 1903	269	9:00
10	7	5 November 1721	265	daytime
11	86	20 August 1831	264	night
12	3	9 September 1706	262	daytime
13	319	30 November 1999	262	4:35
14	25	10 September 1736	261	
15	298	6 December 1986	260	13:30
16	215	15 October 1929	258	17:15
18	83	24 January 1822	254	night
19	144	29 October 1874	252	4:00
20	55	20 November 1764	244	–
21	201	17 November 1917	244	6:50
22	254	18 October 1967	244	13:30
23	45	29 September 1756	242	
24	136	20 October 1873	242	–
25	175	4 November 1897	242	12:00
26	261	17 November 1974	242	1:00
27	177	26 November 1898	240	23:30
28	260	20 December 1973	240	7:15
29	219	8 January 1932	239	3:00
30	225	8 October 1935	239	5:50
31	18	12 October 1729	237	10:00
32	76	29 September 1788	237	–
33	145	26 November 1874	237	4:00
34	171	2 November 1895	237	3:00
35	227	9 September 1937	236	5:30
36	37	17 October 1744	234	–
37	41	26 October 1752	234	12:00
38	43	11 December 1752	234	night
39	228	14 September 1938	233	2:25
40	269	7 September 1977	231	16:50
41	292	1 January 1984	231	21:20
42	125	19 January 1866	229	10:00
43	208	24 November 1922	228	19:15
44	315	12 October 1994	228	13:50
45	116	8 October 1863	227	2:00
46	211	3 January 1925	225	21:30
47	81	6 September 1802	224	daytime
48	122	19 May 1865	224	9:10
49	202	24 August 1918	224	9:10
50	242	14 October 1954	222	21:00
	320	9 January 2005	239	

== Protective dam ==
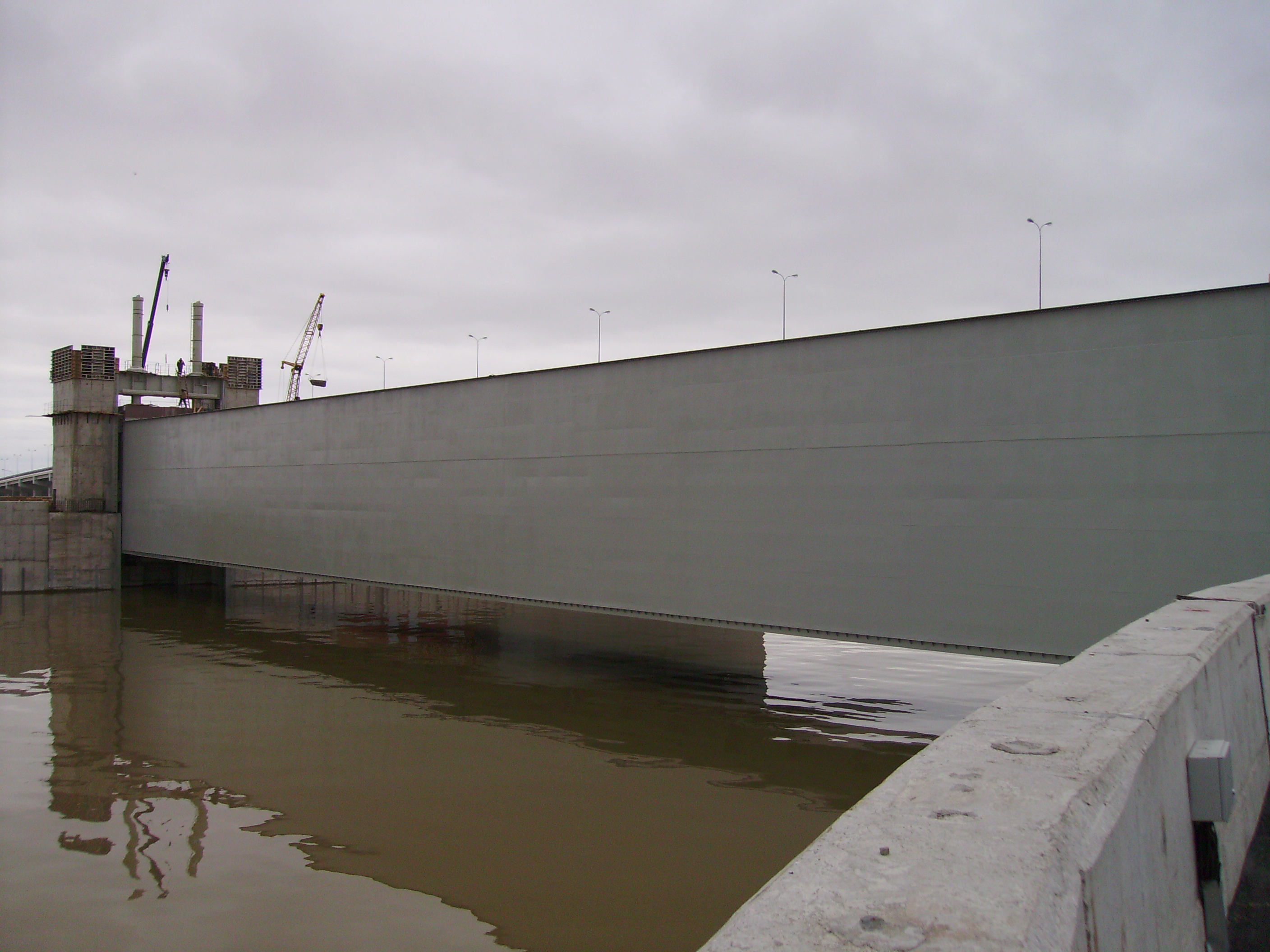
A giant lock of the Saint Petersburg Dam.

Construction of a complex of dams protecting St. Petersburg from the floods began in 1979 but was halted in the 1990s when 60% was completed. The construction was resumed in 2005 and the completed dam was inaugurated on 12 August 2011. The dam is also the last completed part of the Saint Petersburg Ring Road, providing direct roadway access from mainland to the Kotlin Island and Kronshtadt.

The first use of the dam to hold back the incoming Baltic water into Neva bay took place 28 November 2011, when a major storm came from Scandinavia and caused a surge wave. Closing the dam had resulted in decrease of water rise to 1.3 masl, that is below flood level equal to 1.6 masl, which prevented the flood and saved some 1.3 billion roubles of possible damage. Though the 309th flood in the history of the city happened a month later at 27—28 December 2011, when despite closing the dam gates heavy cyclone forced the water to rise up to 1.7 masl which couldn't make serious damage to the city. Specialists suppose that if there were no dam, there could have been level up to 2.3 masl with serious consequences.

== See also ==
- Geography of Saint Petersburg
- History of Saint Petersburg
