= Saint Petersburg Dam =

Flood control dam complex near Saint Petersburg, Russia

Coordinates: 59°59′32″N 29°41′46″E

External videos
- Video on YouTube demonstrating closed S-1 gates in the time of storm in 27–28 December 2011

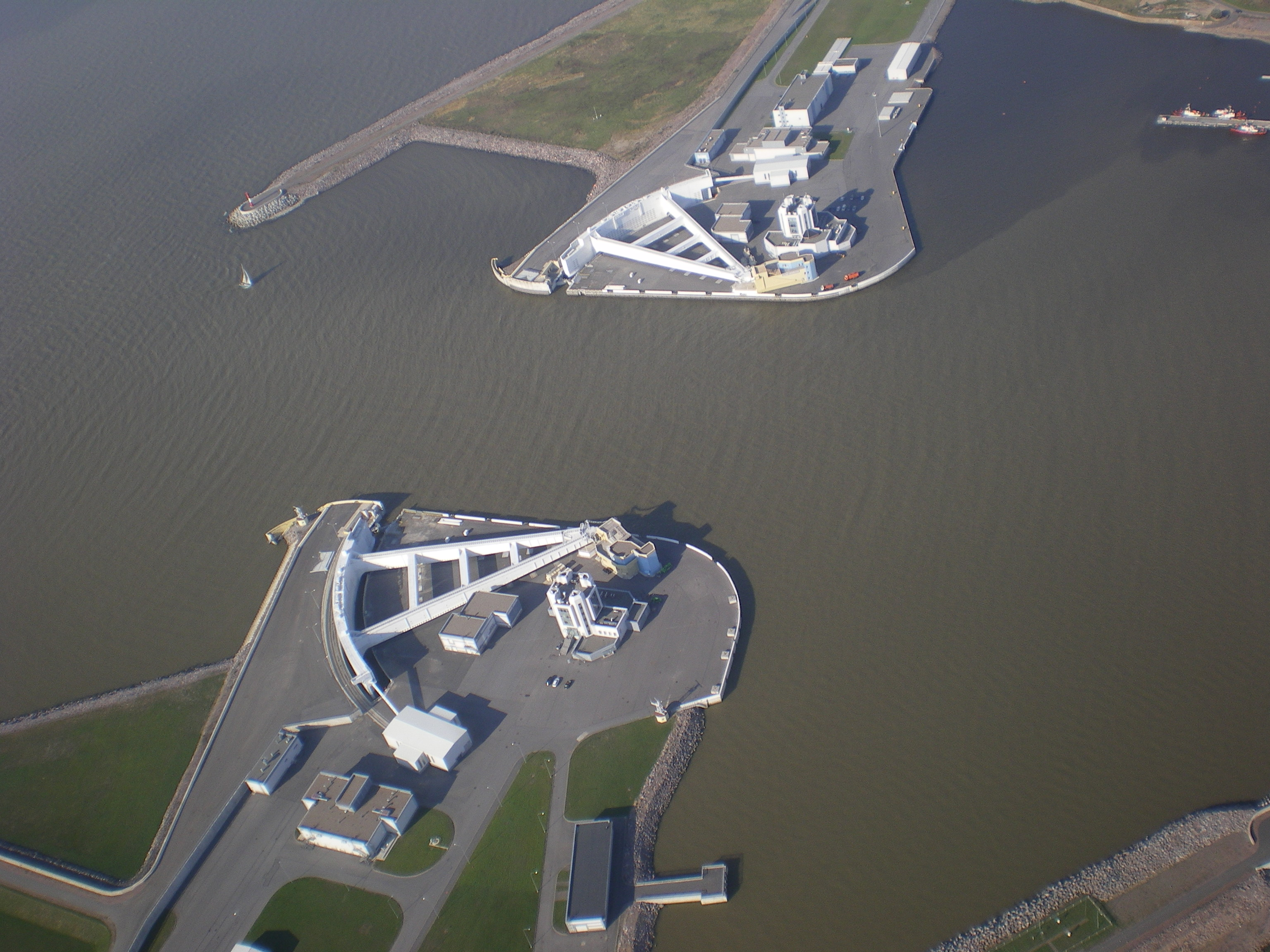
Navigation Pass S-1

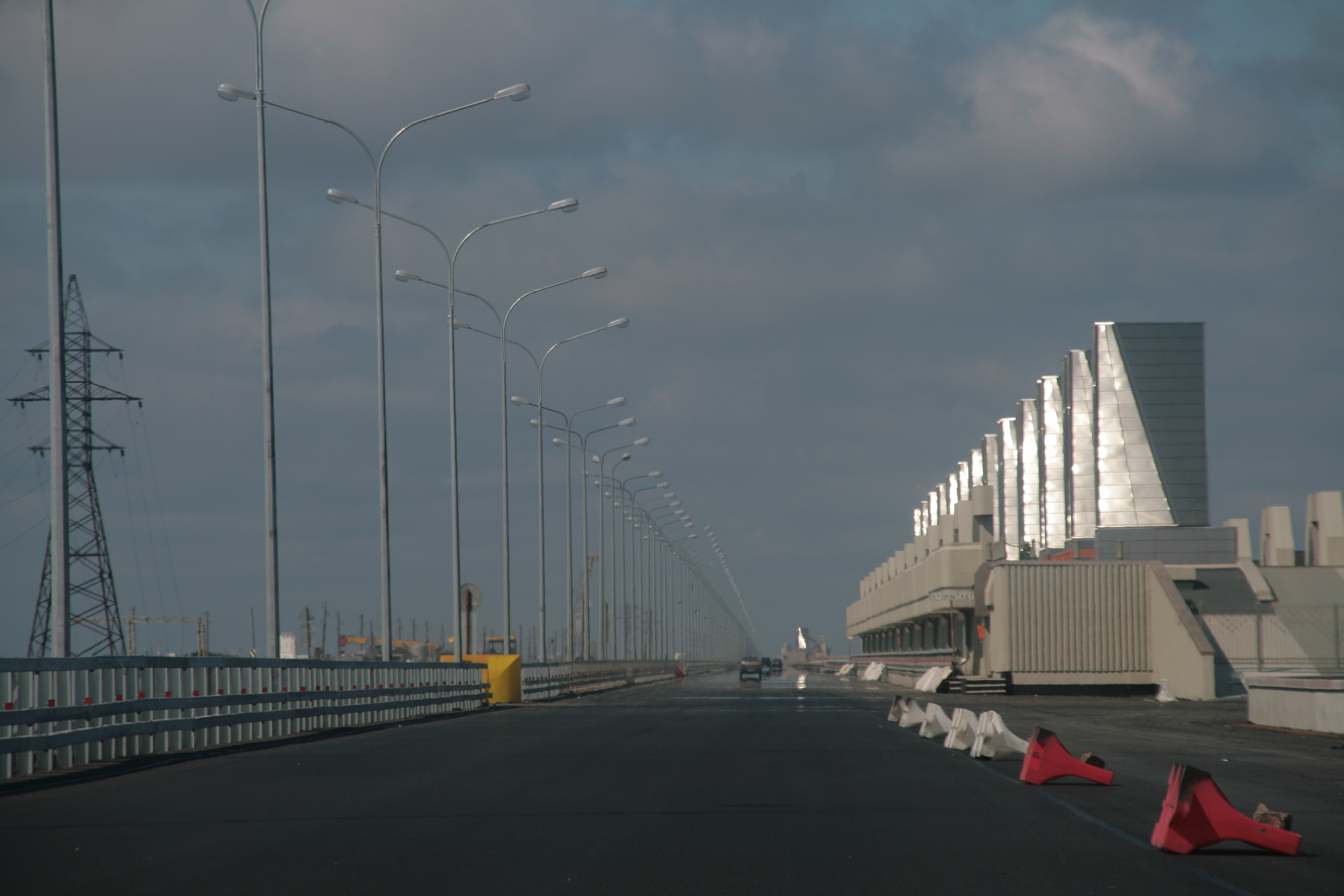
A part of the Saint Petersburg Ring Road over the dam

The Saint Petersburg Flood Prevention Facility Complex (Note: Before 2003 when construction resumed after a 15-year pause, the dam was officially called the "Leningrad Flood Prevention Facility Complex") (Russian: Ко́мплекс защи́тных сооруже́ний Санкт-Петербу́рга от наводне́ний, romanized: kómpleks zashchítnykh sooruzhéniy Sankt-Peterbúrga ot navodnéniy), unofficially the Saint Petersburg Dam, is a 25 km (16 mi) long complex of dams for flood control near Saint Petersburg, Russia. The dam extends from Lomonosov northward to Kotlin Island (and the city of Kronstadt), then turns east toward Cape Lisiy Nos near Sestroretsk.

The complex is intended to protect Saint Petersburg from storm surges by separating the Neva Bay from the rest of the Gulf of Finland. The dam's tunnel also serves as the final leg of the Saint Petersburg Ring Road. The northern and southern parts of the dam act like two giant bridges, providing access from the mainland to Kotlin Island and Kronstadt.

Historically, storm surges from the gulf have caused over 300 floods of varying severity within the city, some with devastating effects. The dam has the capability to protect the city from water rising up to 5 m (16 ft). Its first use to hold back the incoming Baltic water into Neva Bay on 28 November 2011 resulted in a water rise of 1.3 meters above sea level (masl), below the flood level of 1.6 masl according to the Baltic system of coordinates. This prevented what would have been the 309th flood in the recorded history of the city, saving some 1.3 billion roubles of projected damage.

The construction of the flood prevention complex started in 1978 and became one of the longest construction projects in Russia. After a protracted halt in the 1990s and early 2000s, construction was resumed in 2005 due to the intervention of Russia's President Vladimir Putin, a native of Saint Petersburg. Putin finally inaugurated the finished complex in 2011, when all the facilities at the southern part of the dam were completed, along with the 1.2 km (0.75 mi) long underwater roadway tunnel below the main southern lock, the longest undersea tunnel in Russia.

Over 30 water purification installations are placed around the dam, part of a larger program to clean the water in the Neva Bay.

== Specifications ==
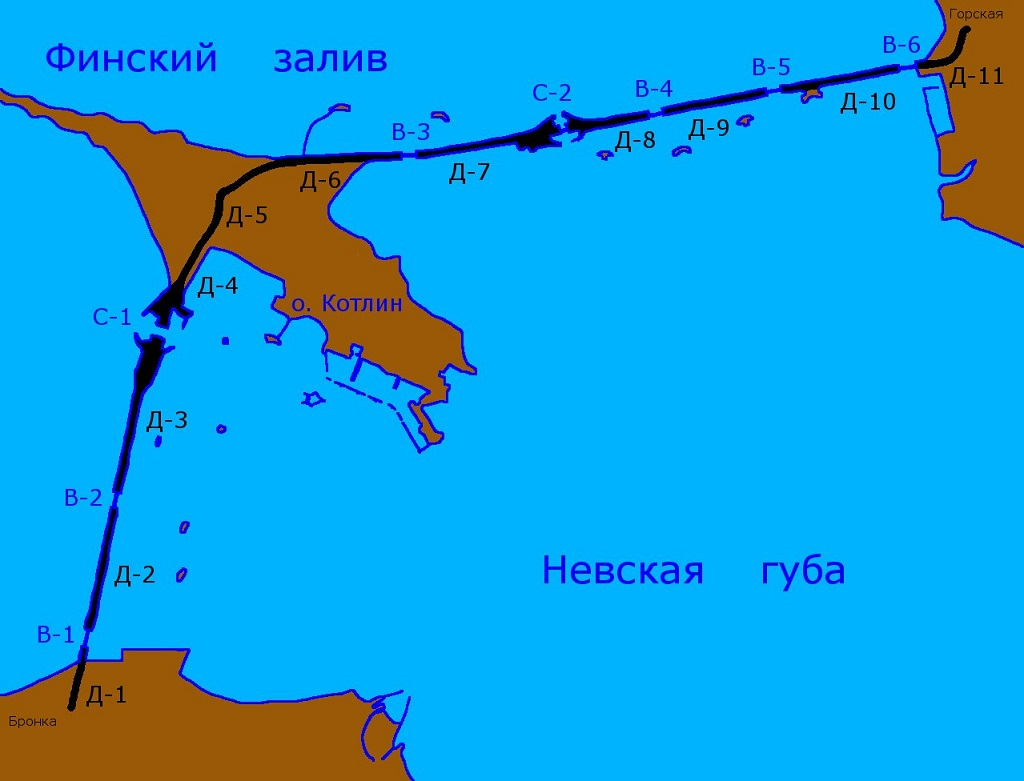
Plan of the Saint-Petersburg dam

The dam spans the Gulf of Finland, with the island of Kotlin (Kronstadt) at its centre. It extends for 25.4 km (15.8 mi) and stands 8 m (26 ft) above sea level. It incorporates two large openings for shipping, which can be closed when floods threaten. Construction began in 1979 but stalled in the Russian political and economic upheavals of the 1990s; it resumed many years later and finally ended in 2011. The main benefit that most people cite is not flood control but rather improved traffic flow, as the dam completes the Saint Petersburg Ring Road.

== Floods on the Neva ==
Saint Petersburg suffers from frequent floods (more than 340 in recorded history), some being natural disasters. It is situated on drained marshlands, isles and lowlands in the estuary of the Neva River, where flooding is common. Flow from Lake Ladoga is significant and the Neva's current is rapid, but flooding is generally caused by water backing up the Neva from its outlet, the Gulf of Finland. Most rivers flood in periods of exceptionally high flow, but the Neva typically floods in late autumn.

In the early literature, high winds from the Gulf of Finland were often cited as the cause of Neva flooding, but scientists now understand the more complex hydrometeorological chain of events behind it. A low-pressure region in the North Atlantic moves onshore, giving rise to cyclonic lows on the Baltic Sea. The low pressure of the cyclone draws greater-than-normal quantities of water into the virtually landlocked Baltic. As the cyclone continues inland, long low-frequency (Note: Waves with wavelengths up to several hundred kilometers.) seiche waves are established in the Baltic. When the waves reach the narrow and shallow Neva Bay, they become much higher, ultimately breaching the Neva embankments. (Note: This is similar to a tidal bore, where incoming tides are funneled into a shallow, narrowing river via a broad bay. The funnel-like shape increases the height of the tide above normal, and the flood appears as a relatively rapid increase in the water level.)

The worst such flood occurred on 19 November 1824, when the water level rose 4.21 m (13.8 ft) above normal. The playwright Alexander Griboyedov wrote, "The embankments of the various canals had disappeared and all the canals had united into one. Hundred-year-old trees in the Summer Garden were ripped from the ground and lying in rows, roots upward." When the waters receded 569 people were dead, with thousands more injured or made ill – more than 300 buildings had been washed away. The 1824 inundation is the setting for Alexander Pushkin's famous poem, The Bronze Horseman (1834). Other disastrous floods took place in 1777 and 1924. One of the most recent floods occurred on 18–19 October 1998, when the water level rose to 2.2 m (7.2 ft).

== Project ==
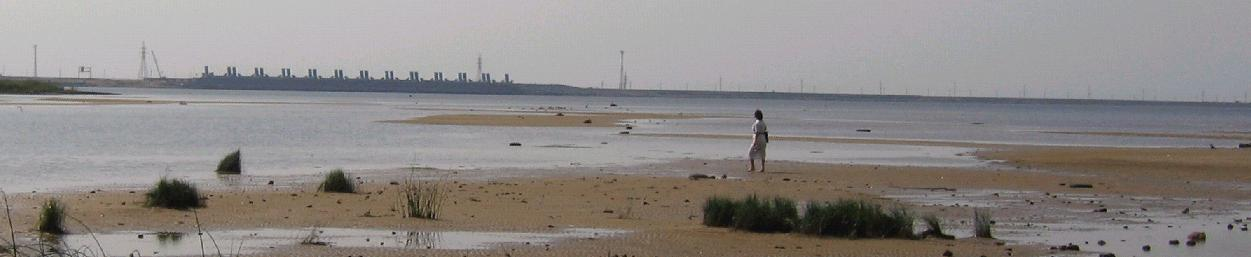
The dam seen from the north (2005)

For years, prominent scientists and statesmen of imperial Russia developed various plans for flood protection, and the Soviet Union implemented the idea. The flood of 1955 finally made it clear that the city needed a protective dam. Many options were considered before the Soviet government decided on a 25.4 km (15.8 mi) complex of 11 dams, including a six-lane highway on the top.

The project was begun in 1979, and construction continued through 1995, at which point the dam was around 70% complete, when due to difficulties obtaining financing after the fall of the Soviet Union the project was suspended until 2005, when President Vladimir Putin ordered its resumption. Construction was completed in 2011, and the formal opening of the complex was on 12 August 2011.

The entire project cost roughly 109 billion rubles ($3.85 billion), and resulted in a series of eleven separate dams measuring 25 kilometres (16 mi) across the Gulf of Finland. Built into the structure are two openings to allow ships to pass through, six gates that can be closed to hold back water, and about 30 facilities for purifying water flowing into the gulf. It took 42 hm^{3} (55,000,000 yd^{3}) of stone and soil, 2 hm^{3} (2,600,000 yd^{3}) of reinforced concrete and about 100,000 tonnes (110,000 short tons) of steel structures and other materials to build the dam. The project was designed and implemented by over 100 scientific and design institutions, construction companies and suppliers of materials and equipment.

== Criticism ==
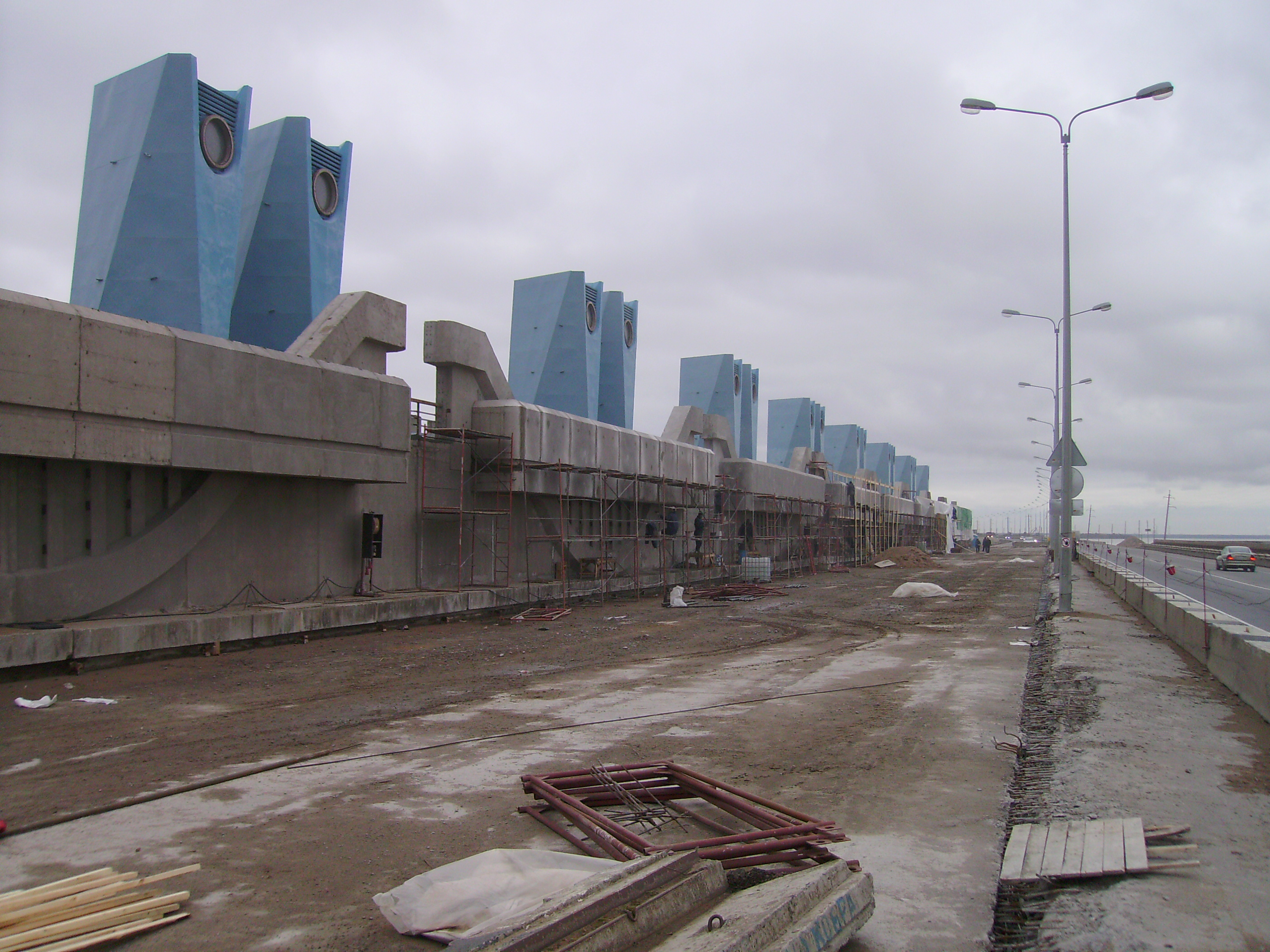
The dam during construction

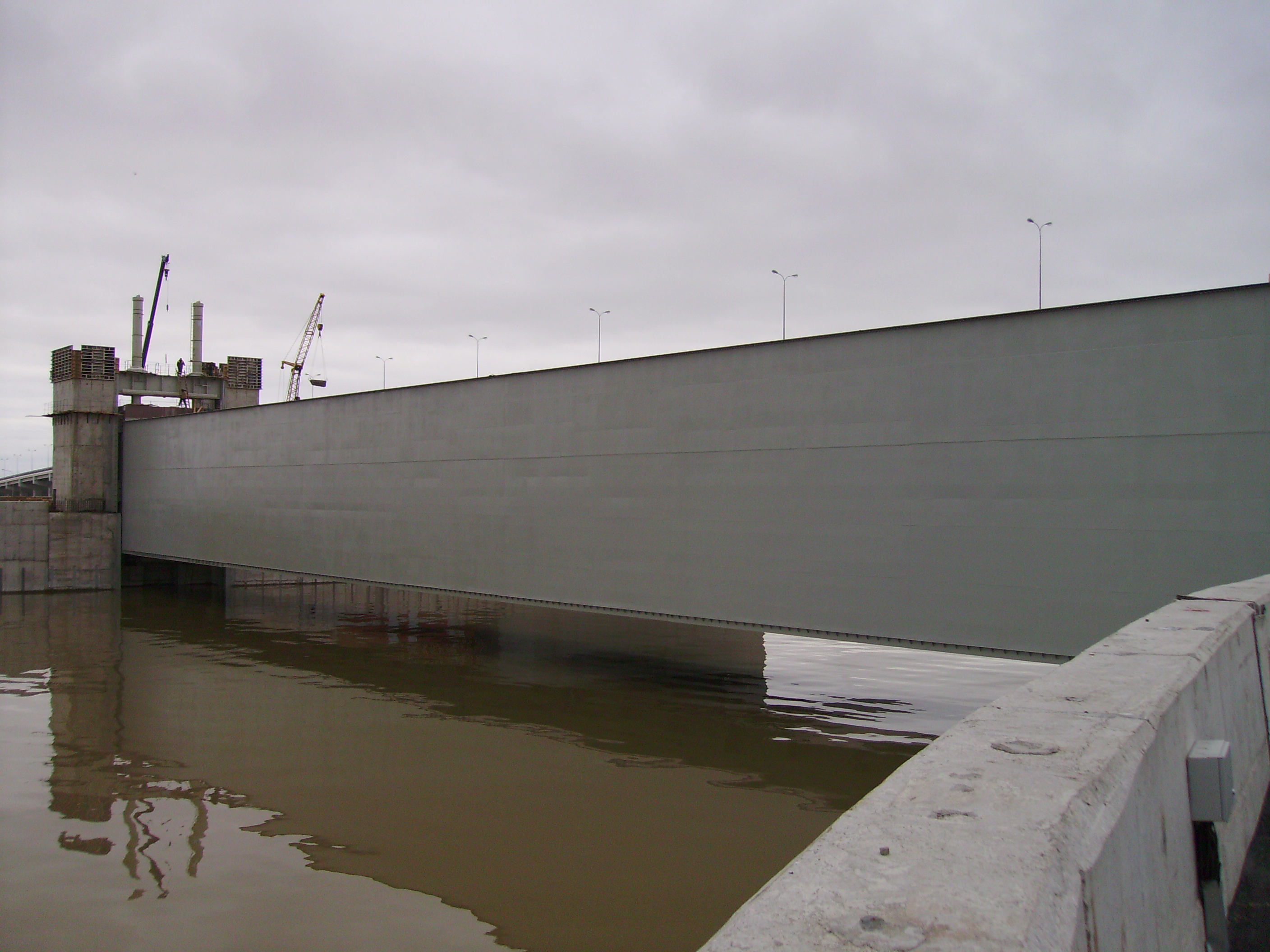
Lock No. 2 of the Saint Petersburg Dam

Opponents raised concerns and staged demonstrations during construction of the dam. The main concerns relate to water quality and impact on historically significant sites.

=== Water quality ===
The dam's opponents fear that the dam will constrain water flow, accumulating polluted water inside the dam. Damming an estuary and altering its flow pattern generates a number of physical and biological impacts; the disruption of the normal flow obstructs natural current and affects the water's habitat. The 60 canals and rivers that flow through Saint Petersburg will all discharge into the dammed area. Currently the Neva's water is good enough to serve as a source for drinking water.

To address the problem of water pollution, the city's government adopted a plan to upgrade the city's sewage system to limit the amount of untreated wastewater release to less than 0.1%. The measures being taken seem to be quite efficient – after the launch of the modern long-awaited South-West Wastewater Treatment Plant in 2006 the amount of biological and phosphate waste is expected to be lowered by 60% and 25%, respectively. Over 30 water purification installations are placed around the dam complex, as part of a larger effort to clean the water in Neva Bay.

=== World Heritage Site impacts ===
The dam passes through the historic Northern Forts of Kronstadt, which is a World Heritage Site.

== See also ==
- Geography of Saint Petersburg

== Sources ==
- No longer flows the Neva – Leningrad grapples with a crisis in water quality, by Peter Riggs, In the Whole Earth Review, Spring ed. 1990.
- The Neva Project : Ecology and Cultural History in an Urban River, In honour of Saint Petersburg's Tricentennial, 1703–2003.
- "Pressure On Dam Finally Threatens Break through". The Saint Petersburg Times. 1 November 2005. Archived 30 September 2007 at the Wayback Machine.
- "St. Petersburg's Dam Gets Funding Inflow". The Moscow Times. 8 November 2005.
- Dmitry Generalnicky (21 December 2005). "Saint Petersburg's way of fighting floods" – via eJournal.
- "Saint Petersburg and Related Groups of Monuments". Unesco World Heritage.
