= The Bronze Horseman (poem) =

1837 poem by Alexander Pushkin

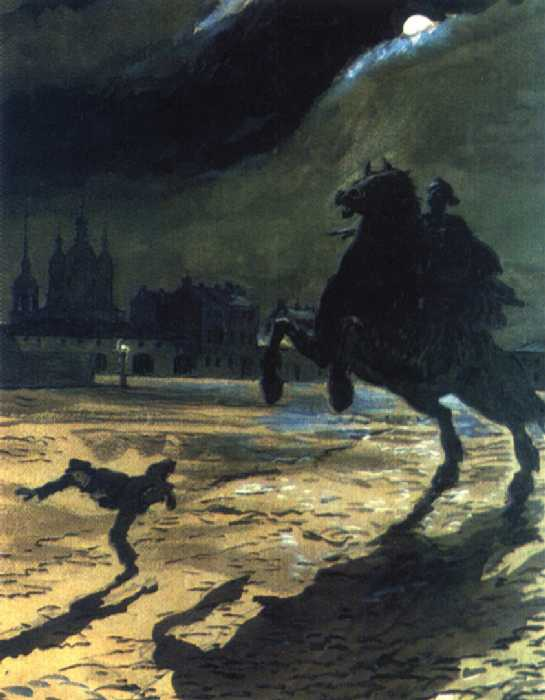
- Alexandre Benois's illustration to the poem (1904)
- Author: Alexander Pushkin
- Original title: Медный Всадник [Mednyi Vsadnik]
- Translator: C. E. Turner
- Language: Russian
- Genre: Narrative poem
- Publisher: Sovremennik
- Publication date: 1837
- Publication place: Russia
- English publication date: 1882

The Bronze Horseman: A Petersburg Tale (Russian: Медный всадник: Петербургская повесть, romanized: Mednyy vsadnik: Peterburgskaya povest) is a narrative poem written by Alexander Pushkin in 1833 about the equestrian statue of Peter the Great in Saint Petersburg and the great flood of 1824. While the poem was written in 1833, it was not published in its entirety until after Pushkin's death, as his work was under censorship due to the political nature of his other writings. Widely considered to be Pushkin's most successful narrative poem, The Bronze Horseman has had a lasting impact on Russian literature. The Pushkin critic A. D. P. Briggs praises the poem "as the best in the Russian language, and even the best poem written anywhere in the nineteenth century". It is considered one of the most influential works in Russian literature and is one of the reasons Pushkin is often called the "founder of modern Russian literature".

The statue became known as The Bronze Horseman due to the great influence of the poem.

== Plot summary ==
The poem is divided into three sections: a shorter introduction (90 lines) and two longer parts (164 and 222 lines). The introduction opens with a mythologized history of the establishment of the city of Saint Petersburg in 1703. In the first two stanzas, Peter the Great stands at the edge of the River Neva and conceives the idea for a city which will threaten the Swedes and open a "window to Europe". The poem describes the area as almost uninhabited: Peter can only see one boat and a handful of dark houses inhabited by Finnish peasants. Saint Petersburg was in fact constructed on territory newly regained from the Swedes in the Great Northern War, and Peter himself chose the site for the founding of a major city because it provided Russia with a corner of access to the Baltic Sea, and thus to the Atlantic and Europe.

The rest of the introduction is in the first person and reads as an ode to the city of Petersburg. The poet-narrator describes how he loves Petersburg, including the city's "stern, muscular appearance" (l. 44), its landmarks such as the Admiralty (ll. 50–58), and its harsh winters and long summer evenings (ll. 59 – ll. 84). He encourages the city to retain its beauty and strength and stand firm against the waves of the Neva (ll. 85–91).

Part I opens with an image of the Neva growing rough in a storm: the river is "tossing and turning like a sick man in his troubled bed" (ll. 5–6). Against this backdrop, a young poor man in the city, Evgenii, is contemplating his love for a young woman, Parasha, and planning to spend the rest of his life with her (ll. 49–62). Evgenii falls asleep, and the narrative then turns back to the Neva, with a description of how the river floods and destroys much of the city (ll. 72–104). The frightened and desperate Evgenii is left sitting alone on top of two marble lions on Peter's Square, surrounded by water and with the Bronze Horseman statue looking down on him (ll. 125–164).

In Part II, Evgenii finds a ferryman and commands him to row to where Parasha's home used to be (ll. 26 – ll. 56). However, he discovers that her home has been destroyed (ll. 57–60), and falls into a crazed delirium and breaks into laughter (ll. 61–65). For a year, he roams the street as a madman (ll. 89–130), but the following autumn, he is reminded of the night of the storm (ll. 132–133) and the source of his troubles. In a fit of rage, he curses the statue of Peter (ll. 177–179), which brings the statue to life, and Peter begins pursuing Evgenii (ll. 180–196). The narrator does not describe Evgenii's death directly, but the poem closes with the discovery of his corpse in a ruined hut floating on the water (ll. 219–222).

== Genre ==
Formally, the poem is an unusual mix of genres: the sections dealing with Tsar Peter are written in a solemn, odic, 18th-century style, while the Evgenii sections are prosaic, playful and, in the latter stages, filled with pathos. This mix of genres is anticipated by the title: "The Bronze Horseman" suggested a grandiose ode, but the subtitle "A Petersburg Tale" leads one to expect an unheroic protagonist. Metrically, the entire poem is written using the four-foot iamb, one of Pushkin's preferred meters, a versatile form which is able to adapt to the changing mood of the poem. The poem has a varied rhyme scheme and stanzas of varying length.

The critic Michael Wachtel has suggested that Pushkin intended to produce a national epic in this poem, arguing that the Peter sections have many of the typical features of epic poetry. He points to Pushkin's extensive use of Old Testament language and allusions when describing both the founding of St Petersburg and the flood and argues that they draw heavily on the Book of Genesis. Further evidence for the categorization of Pushkin's poem as an epic can be seen in its rhyme scheme and stanza structure which allow the work to convey its meaning in a very concise yet artistic manner. Another parallel to the classical epic tradition can be drawn in the final scenes of Evgenii's burial, described as "for God's sake." In Russian, this phrase is not one of "chafing impatience, but of the kind of appeal to Christian sentiment which a beggar might make" according to Newman. Therefore, it is a lack of empathy and charity in Petersburg that ultimately causes Evgenii's death. The requirement that civilization must have a moral order is a theme also found in the writings of Virgil. However, Wachtel adds that the Evgenii plot runs counter to the epic mode, and praises Pushkin for his "remarkable ability to synthesize diverse materials, styles and genres". What is particularly unusual is that Pushkin focuses on a protagonist who is of humble background, as well as one who is ostensibly great. There are more questions than answers in this new type of epic, where "an agnostic irony can easily find a place" while "the unbiased reader would be forced to recognize as concerned with the profoundest issues which confront humanity". He concludes that if the poem is to be labeled a national epic, it is a "highly idiosyncratic" one.

== Historical and cultural context ==
Several critics have suggested that the immediate inspiration for The Bronze Horseman was the work of the Polish poet Adam Mickiewicz. Before beginning work on The Bronze Horseman, Pushkin had read Mickiewicz's Forefathers' Eve (1823–1832), which contains a poem entitled "To My Muscovite Friends", a thinly veiled attack on Pushkin and Vasily Zhukovsky for their failure to join the radical Decembrist revolt of 1825. Forefather's Eve contains poems where Peter I is described as a despot who created the city because of autocratic whim, and a poem mocks the Falconet statue as looking as though he is about to jump off a precipice. Pushkin's poem can be read in part as a retort to Mickiewicz, although most critics agree that its concerns are much broader than answering a political enemy.

There are distinct similarities between Pushkin's protagonist in The Bronze Horseman, and that of his other work Eugene Onegin. Originally, Pushkin wanted to continue Eugene Onegin in this narrative, but instead chose to make a new Evgenii, with a different family name but who was still a "caricature of Pushkin's own character". Both were descendants of the old regime of Boyars that now found itself socially insignificant in a society where family heritage was not esteemed.

=== The statue ===
The Bronze Horseman of the title was sculpted by Étienne Maurice Falconet and completed in 1782. Catherine the Great, a German princess who married into the Romanov family, commissioned the construction of the statue to legitimize her rule and claim to the throne to the Russian people; she had actually come to power through an illegal palace coup. She had the statue inscribed with the phrase "To Peter the first, from Catherine the second" in both Latin and Russian, meaning to show reverence to the ruler and indicate where she saw her place among Russia's rulers.

The statue took 12 years to make. It depicts Peter the Great astride his horse, his outstretched arm reaching toward the Neva River in the western part of the country. The statue is lauded for its ambiguity; in a book about Petersburg in 1821, the French statesman Joseph de Maistre commented that he did not know "whether Peter's bronze hand protects or threatens". It is said that Pushkin felt the ambiguous message of the statue and was inspired to pen the poem.

=== The city of St. Petersburg ===
St. Petersburg was built by Peter the Great at the beginning of the 18th century, on the swampy shores and islands of the Neva. The difficulties of construction were numerous, but Peter was unperturbed by the expenditure of human life required to fulfil his vision of a city on the coast. Of the artisans whom he compelled to come north to lay the foundations of the city, thousands died of hardship and disease; and the city, in its unnatural location, was at the mercy of terrible floods caused by the breaking-up of the ice of Lake Ladoga just to the east – as on the occasion described in the poem – by the west wind blowing back the Neva. There had been one such devastating flood in 1777 and again in 1824, during Pushkin's time and the flood modeled in the poem, and they continued until the Saint Petersburg Dam, completed in 2011, was built.

== Themes ==
=== Statue vs. Evgenii ===
The conflict between Tsar and subject, or empire and individual, is a key theme of The Bronze Horseman. Critics differ as to whether Pushkin ultimately sides with Evgenii—the little man—or Peter and historical necessity. The radical 19th-century critic Vissarion Belinsky considered the poem a vindication of Peter's policies, while the writer Dmitri Merezhkovsky thought it a poem of individual protest.

Another interpretation of the poem suggests that the statue does not actually come to life, but that Evgenii loses his sanity. Pushkin makes Evgenii go mad to create "a terrifying dimension to even the most humdrum personality and at the same time show the abyss hidden in the most apparently common-place human soul". In this regard, Evgenii is seen to become a disinherited man of the time in much the same vein as a traditional epic hero.

Perhaps Evgenii is not Peter's enemy at all. According to Newman, "[Evgenii] is too small for that." Instead, the heroic conflict of the poem is between Peter the Great and the elements while Evgenii is merely its "impotent victim." As Evgenii becomes more and more distressed at the disappearance of his fiancée, his increasing anxiety is juxtaposed with the indifference of the ferryman who rows him across the river. Newman thus calls into question whether or not Evgenii is justified in these feelings and how these feelings reflect his non-threatening position in relation to the statue.

=== Man's position in relation to nature ===
In the very act of conceiving and creating his city in the northern swamps, Peter has imposed order on the primeval natural scene depicted at the beginning of the poem. The city itself, "graceful yet austere" in its classical design, is, as much as the Falconet statue, Peter's living monument, carrying on his struggle against the "wild, tumultuous" Finnish waves. Its granite banks may hold the unruly elements in check for most of the time, but even they are helpless against such a furious rebellion as the flood of 1824. The waves’ victory is, admittedly, short-lived: the flood soon recedes and the city returns to normal. Even so, it is clear that they can never be decisively defeated; they live to fight another day.

A psychoanalytical reading by Daniel Rancour-Laferriere suggests that there is an underlying concern with couvade syndrome or male birthing in the poem. He argues that the passages of the creation of Petersburg resemble the Greek myth of Zeus giving birth to Athena, and suggests that the flood corresponds to the frequent use of water as a metaphor for birth in many cultures. He suggests that the imagery describing Peter and the Neva is gendered: Peter is male and the Neva female.

=== Immortality ===
Higher authority is represented most clearly by Peter. What is more, he represents it in a way which sets him apart from the mass of humanity and even (so Pushkin hints, as we shall see) from such run-of-the-mill autocrats as Alexander I. Only in the first twenty lines of the poem does Peter appear as a living person. The action then shifts forward abruptly by a hundred years, and the rest of the poem is set in a time when Peter is obviously long since dead. Yet despite this we have a sense throughout of Peter's living presence, as if he had managed to avoid death in a quite unmortal way. The section evoking contemporary St Petersburg—Peter's youthful creation, in which his spirit lives on—insinuates the first slight suggestion of this. Then comes a more explicit hint, as Pushkin voices the hope that the Finnish waves will not 'disturb great Peter's ageless sleep'. Peter, we must conclude, is not dead after all: he will awake from his sleep if danger should at any time threaten his capital city, the heart of the nation. Peter appears not as an ordinary human being but as an elemental force: he is an agent in the historical process, and even beyond this he participates in a wider cosmic struggle between order and disorder. Evgenii is accorded equal status with Peter in purely human terms, and his rebellion against state power is shown to be as admirable and significant in its way as that of the Decembrists. Yet turning now to the question of Evgenii's role in the wider scheme of things, we have to admit that he seems an insignificant third factor in the equation when viewed against the backdrop of the titanic struggle taking place between Peter and the elements. Evgenii is utterly and completely helpless against both. The flood sweeps away all his dreams of happiness, and it is in the river that he meets his death. Peter's statue, which at their first "encounter" during the flood had its back turned to Evgenii as if ignoring him, late hounds him mercilessly when he dares to protest at Peter's role in his suffering. The vast, impersonal forces of order and chaos, locked in an unending struggle—these, Pushkin seems to be saying, are the reality: these are the millstones of destiny or of the historical process to which Evgenii and his kind are but so much grist.

== Symbolism ==
=== The river ===
Peter the Great chose the river and all of its elemental forces as an entity worth combating. Peter "harnesses it, dresses it up, and transforms it into the centerpiece of his imperium." However, the river cannot be tamed for long. It brings floods to Peter's orderly city as "It seethes up from below, manifesting itself in uncontrolled passion, illness, and violence. It rebels against order and tradition. It wanders from its natural course." "Before Peter, the river lived in an uneventful but primeval existence" and though Peter tries to impose order, the river symbolizes what is natural and tries to return to its original state. "The river resembles Evgenii not as an initiator of violence but as a reactant. Peter has imposed his will on the people (Evgenii) and nature (the Neva) as a means of realizing his imperialistic ambitions" and both Evgenii and the river try to break away from the social order and world that Peter has constructed.

=== The Bronze Horseman ===
The Bronze Horseman symbolizes "Tsar Peter, the city of St Petersburg, and the uncanny reach of autocracy over the lives of ordinary people." When Evgenii threatens the statue, he is threatening "everything distilled in the idea of Petersburg." At first, Evgenii was just a lowly clerk who the Bronze Horseman could not deign to recognize because Evgenii was so far beneath him. However, when Evgenii challenges him, "Peter engages the world of Evgenii" as a response to Evgenii's arrogance. The "statue stirs in response to his challenge" and gallops after him to crush his rebellion. Before, Evgenii was just a little man that the Bronze Horseman would not bother to respond to. Upon Evgenii's challenge, however, he becomes an equal and a rival that the Bronze Horseman must crush in order to protect the accomplishments he stands for.

== Soviet analysis ==
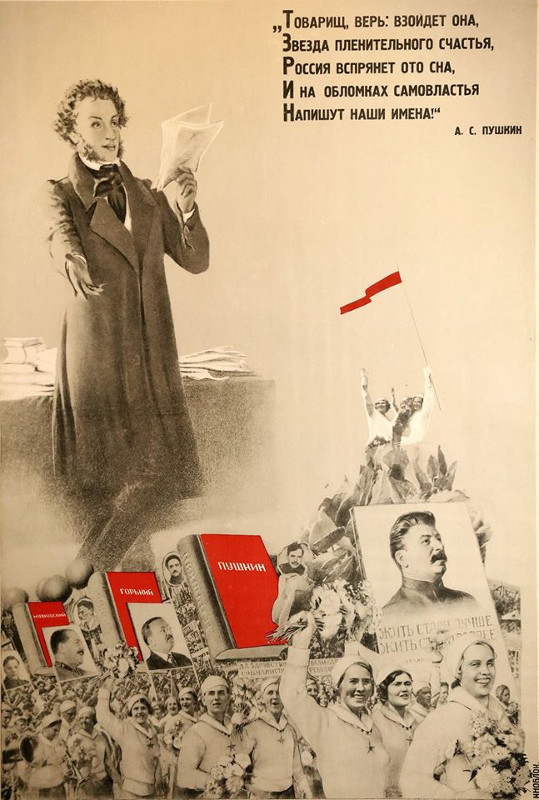
Alexander Pushkin on Soviet poster

Pushkin's poem became particularly significant during the Soviet era. Pushkin depicted Peter as a strong leader, so allowing Soviet citizens to praise their own Peter, Joseph Stalin. Stalin himself was said to be "most willingly compared" to Peter the Great. A poll in Literaturnyi sovremennik in March 1936 reported praise for Pushkin's portrayal of Peter, with comments in favour of how The Bronze Horseman depicted the resolution of the conflict between the personal and the public in favour of the public. This was in keeping with the Stalinist emphasis of how the achievements of Soviet society as a whole were to be extolled over the sufferings of the individual. Soviet thinkers also read deeper meanings into Pushkin's works. Andrei Platonov wrote two essays to commemorate the centenary of Pushkin's death, both published in Literaturnyi kritik. In Pushkin, Our Comrade, Platonov expanded upon his view of Pushkin as a prophet of the later rise of socialism. Pushkin not only 'divined the secret of the people', wrote Platonov, he depicted it in The Bronze Horseman, where the collision between Peter the Great's ruthless quest to build an empire, as expressed in the construction of Saint Petersburg, and Evgenii's quest for personal happiness will eventually come together and be reconciled by the advent of socialism. Josef Brodsky's A Guide to a Renamed City "shows both Lenin and the Horseman to be equally heartless arbiters of other's fates," connecting the work to another great Soviet leader.

Soviet literary critics could, however, use the poem to subvert those same ideals. In 1937 the Red Archive published a biographical account of Pushkin, written by E. N. Cherniavsky. In it Cherniavsky explained how The Bronze Horseman could be seen as Pushkin's attack on the repressive nature of the autocracy under Tsar Nicholas I. Having opposed the government and suffered his ruin, Evgenii challenges the symbol of Tsarist authority but is destroyed by its terrible, merciless power. Cherniavsky was perhaps also using the analysis to attack the Soviet system under Stalin. By 1937 the Soviet intelligentsia was faced with many of the same issues that Pushkin's society had struggled with under Nicholas I. Cherniavsky set out how Evgenii was a symbol for the downtrodden masses throughout Russia. By challenging the statue, Evgenii was challenging the right of the autocracy to rule over the people. Whilst in keeping with Soviet historiography of the late Tsarist period, Cherniavsky subtly hinted at opposition to the supreme power presently ruling Russia. He assessed the resolution of the conflict between the personal and the public with praise for the triumph of socialism, but couched it in terms that left his work open to the interpretation that, while openly praising Soviet advances, he was using Pushkin's poem to criticise the methods by which they were achieved.

== Legacy and adaptations ==
The work has had enormous influence in Russian culture. The setting of Evgenii's defiance, Senate Square, was coincidentally also the scene of the Decembrist revolt of 1825. Within the literary realm, Dostoevsky's The Double: A Petersburg Poem (1846) directly engages with The Bronze Horseman, treating Evgenii's madness as parody. The theme of madness parallels many of Gogol's works and became characteristic of 19th- and 20th-century Russian literature. Andrei Bely's novel Petersburg (1913; 1922) uses the Bronze Horseman as a metaphor for the centre of power in the city of Petersburg, which is itself a living entity and the main character of Bely's novel. The bronze horseman, representing Peter the Great, chases the novel's protagonist, Nikolai Ableukhov. He is thus forced to flee the statue just like Evgenii. In this context, Bely implies that Peter the Great was responsible for Russia's national identity, torn between Western and Eastern influences.

Other literary references to the poem include Anna Akmatova's "Poem Without a Hero", which mentions the Bronze Horseman "first as the thudding of unseen hooves". Later on, the epilogue describes her escape from the pursuing Horseman. In Valerii Briusov's work "To the Bronze Horseman" published in 1906, the author suggests that the monument is a "representation of eternity, as indifferent to battles and slaughter as it was to Evgenii's curses".

Nikolai Myaskovsky's 10th Symphony (1926–7) was inspired by the poem.

In 1949 composer Reinhold Glière and choreographer Rostislav Zakharov adapted the poem into a ballet premiered at the Kirov Opera and Ballet Theatre in Leningrad. This production was restored, with some changes, by Yuri Smekalov's ballet (2016) at what was now named the Mariinsky Theatre in what was now named Saint Petersburg. The ballet has recovered its place in the Mariinsky repertoire.

== Sources ==
- Basker, Michael (ed.), The Bronze Horseman. Bristol Classical Press, 2000
- Binyon, T. J. Pushkin: A Biography. Harper Collins, 2002
- Briggs, A. D. P. Aleksandr Pushkin: A Critical Study. Barnes and Noble, 1982
- Debreczany, Paul (1993). ""Zhitie Aleksandra Boldinskogo": Pushkin's Elevation to Sainthood in Soviet Culture". In Lahusen, Thomas; Kuperman, Gene (eds.). Late Soviet Culture: From Perestroika to Novostroika. Duke University Press. ISBN 0-8223-1324-3., 1993
- Kahn, Andrew (ed.), The Cambridge Companion to Pushkin. Cambridge University Press, 2006
- Kahn, Andrew, Pushkin's "Bronze Horseman": Critical Studies in Russian Literature. Bristol Classical Press, 1998
- Little, T. E. (ed.), The Bronze Horseman. Bradda Books, 1974
- Newman, John Kevin. "Pushkin's Bronze Horseman and the Epic Tradition." Comparative Literature Studies 9.2 (1972): JSTOR. Penn State University Press
- Petrone, Karen (2000). Life Has Become More Joyous, Comrades: Celebrations in the Time of Stalin. Indiana University Press. ISBN 0-253-33768-2., 2000
- Rancour-Laferriere, Daniel. "The Couvade of Peter the Great: A Psychoanalytic Aspect of The Bronze Horseman", D. Bethea (ed.). Pushkin Today, Indiana University Press, Bloomington
- Rosenshield, Gary. Pushkin and the Genres of Madness: The Masterpieces of 1833. Madison, WI: University of Wisconsin, 2003.
- Schenker, Alexander M. The Bronze Horseman: Falconet's Monument to Peter the Great. New Haven: Yale University Press, 2003
- Wachtel, Michael. "Pushkin's long poems and the epic impulse". In Andrew Kahn (ed.), The Cambridge Companion to Puskhin, Cambridge: Cambridge University Press, 2006
- Weinstock, Jeffrey Andrew. "The Bronze Horseman." The Ashgate Encyclopedia of Literary and Cinematic Monsters: Central Michigan University, 2014
- Wilson, Edmund. The Triple Thinkers; Ten Essays on Literature. New York: Harcourt, Brace, 1938.
