= Kotlin Island =

Russian island in the Gulf of Finland

Остров Котлин
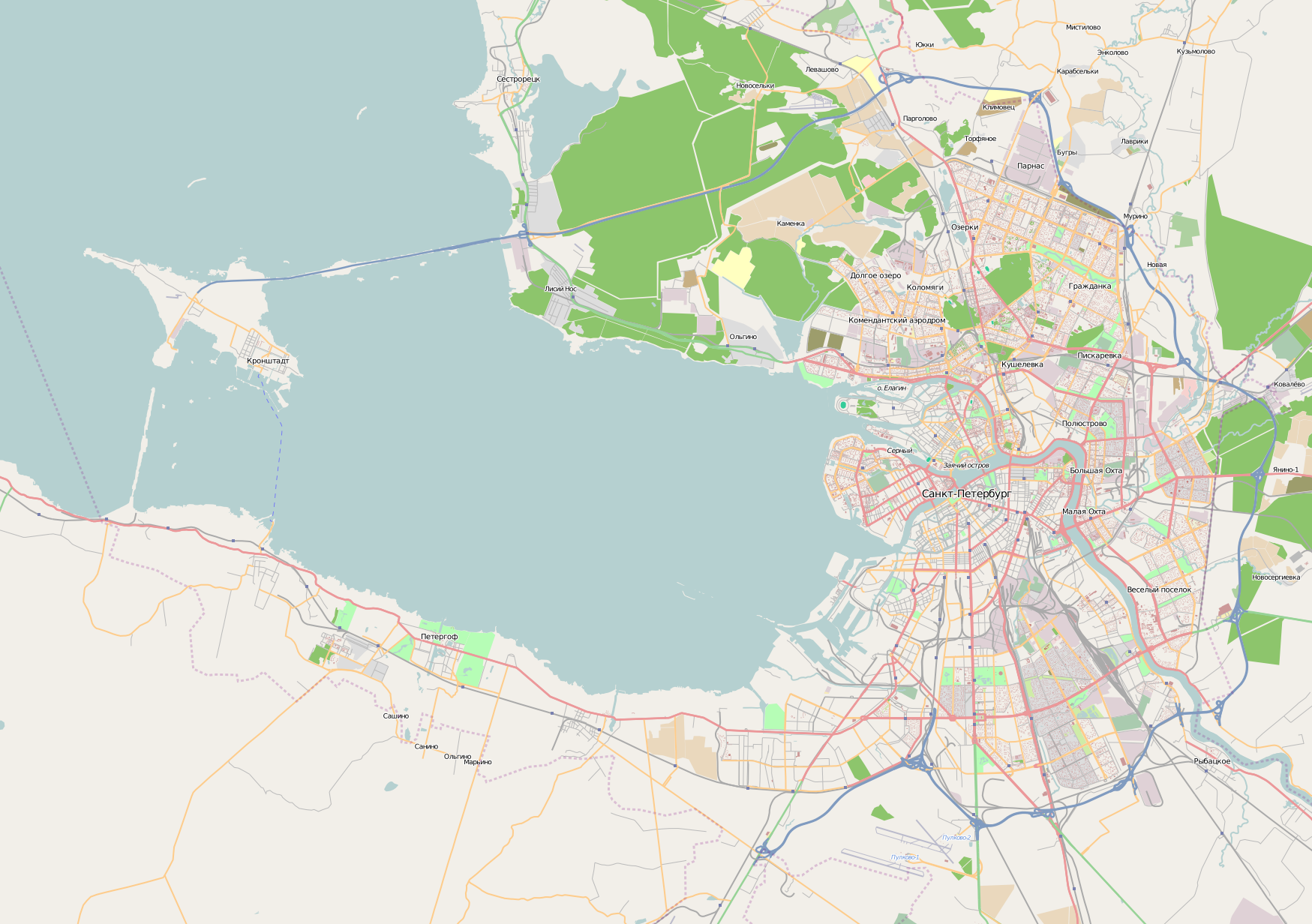
- Map of Kronstadt bay with Kotlin Island in the upper left corner

- Location within Saint Petersburg Location within European Russia Location within Europe

Geography
- Location: Gulf of Finland
- Coordinates: 60°00′45″N 29°44′01″E
- Area: 15 km^{2} (5.8 sq mi)
- Length: 10.2 km (6.34 mi)
- Width: 3.7 km (2.3 mi)
- Highest elevation: 17 m (56 ft)

Administration
- Russian Federation
- Region: Saint Petersburg

Demographics
- Population: 43,005 (2010)
- Pop. density: 2,867/km^{2} (7425/sq mi)

Kotlin (Russian: Ко́тлин; Swedish: Reitskär; Finnish: Retusaari) is a Russian island, located near the head of the Gulf of Finland, 32 kilometres (20 mi) west of Saint Petersburg in the Baltic Sea. Kotlin separates the Neva Bay from the rest of the gulf. The fortified city of Kronstadt is located on the island and forms part of a World Heritage Site that is Saint Petersburg and Related Groups of Monuments. The island serves as a gateway to Saint Petersburg and as such has been the site of several military engagements.

== History ==
The island is mentioned in the 13th century treaty of Novgorod with Hanseatic League and Gotland, once as "Kotlign" and twice as "Kotling". The city of Kronstadt was founded on Kotlin island by Peter the Great, who took it from the Swedes in 1703. In March 1921, Kotlin was the site of the Kronstadt rebellion, which resulted in over 11,000 casualties.

Off Kronstadt is Fort Alexander, an artificial island that housed a research laboratory on plague and other bacterial diseases, from 1898 to 1917.

== Geography ==
In general outline, the island forms an elongated triangle; 12.1 km (7.5 mi) long by about 1.6 km (1.0 mi) broad, with its base towards St Petersburg. The eastern or broad end is occupied by the city of Kronstadt, and shoals extend for 2.4 km (1.5 mi) from the western point of the island to the rock on which the Tolbaaken lighthouse is built.

The island thus divides the seaward approach to St Petersburg into two channels; that on the northern side is obstructed by shoals which extend across it from Kotlin to Lisiy Nos; the southern channel, the highway to the former capital, is narrowed by a spit which projects from opposite Lomonosov on the Russian mainland, and, lying close to Kronstadt, has been historically strongly guarded by batteries.

The naval approach to Saint Petersburg was greatly facilitated by the construction in 1875–85 of a canal, 7 m (23 ft) deep, through the shallows, whereas cars can travel overland to the island by using the Saint Petersburg Dam from the north and south shores of the Gulf of Finland. Started in 1980, but delayed by political upheaval in the 1990s, the dam project was completed in 2010 and officially commissioned in 2011.

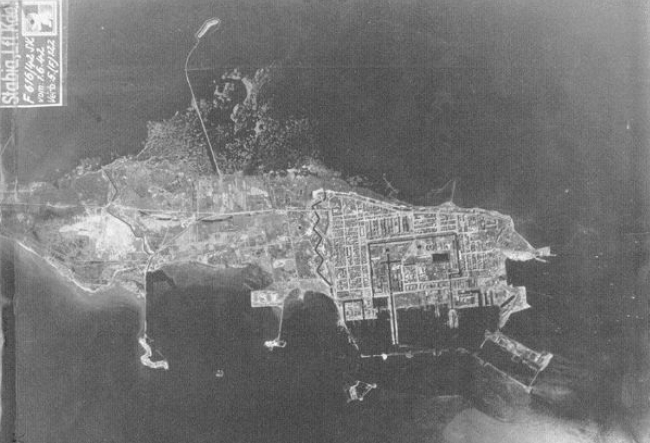
Luftwaffe aerial reconnaissance photo of Kotlin Island, 1 June 1942

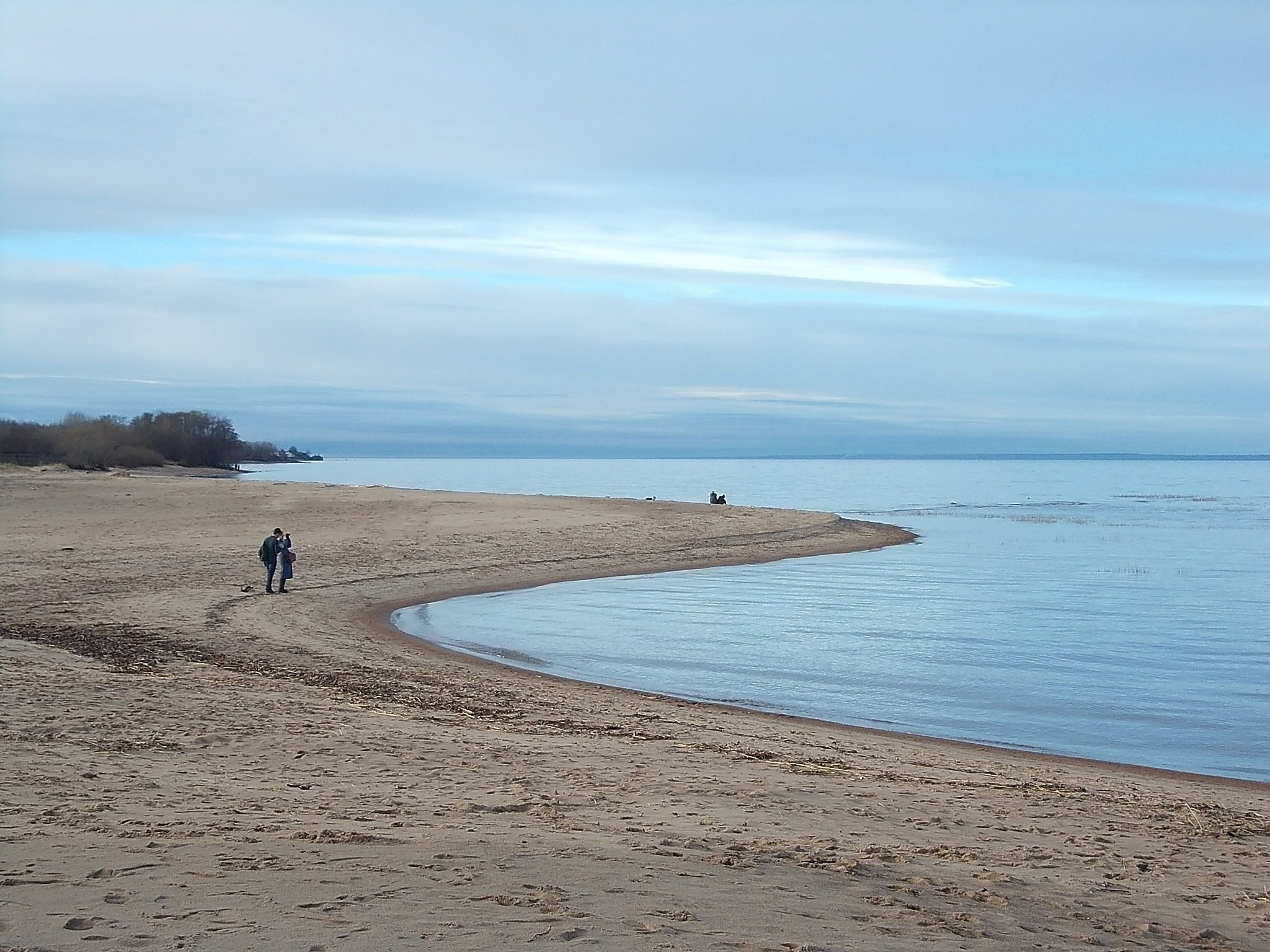
Beach in west Kotlin Island

== Transportation ==
The low water depth in Neva Bay was an incentive to build a Sea Canal to accommodate large vessels, this canal allows the movement of vessels with a draft of 11 metres (to fresh water), a length of 320 metres and a width of 42 metres.
