= Neva Bay =

Easternmost part of the Gulf of Finland

Coordinates: 59°57′N 30°00′E

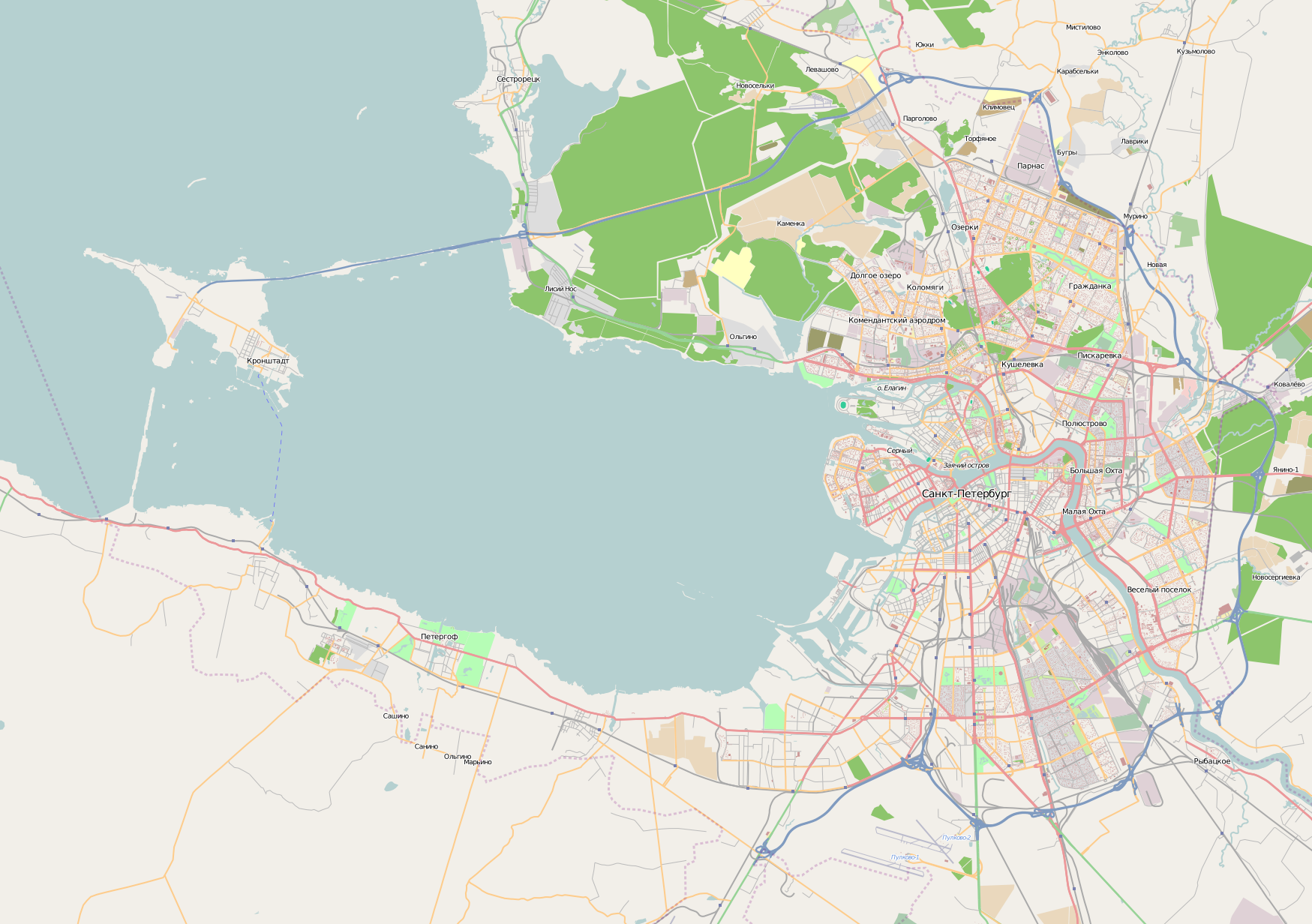
Map of the Neva Bay

The Neva Bay (Russian: Невская губа, romanized: Nevskaya guba), also known as the Gulf of Kronstadt, is the easternmost part of the Gulf of Finland between Kotlin Island and the Neva River estuary where Saint Petersburg city centre is located. It has a surface area of 329 km^{2} (127 sq mi). The entire bay has been separated from the Gulf of Finland by the 25 km long Saint Petersburg Dam. The area of water separated by the dam is 380 km^{2} (150 sq mi). The entire coastline is designated part of St. Petersburg rather than of Leningrad Oblast. (six parts per thousand), the gulf freezes over for three to five months in winter. It receives the Neva and Narva rivers and the Saimaa Canal.

The bay is also informally known as "the Marquis' Puddle" after Jean Baptiste, marquis de Traversay, the Russian naval minister who regarded the shallow waters of the bay as an ideal place for holding naval exercises. The Saint Petersburg Dam separates the bay from the Baltic Sea.
