= Lipsky =

The Lipski family is a noble family from Poland. The surname of Lipsky or Lipski may refer to:

- Ariane Lipski, Brazilian mixed martial artist
- David Lipsky (author), American author
- David Lipsky (born 1988), American golfer
- Donald Lipski, American sculptor
- Eleazar Lipsky, American lawyer, novelist, playwright, president of the Jewish Telegraphic Agency
- Elizabeth Lipski, American author, professor, and clinical nutritionist
- Israel Lipski, convicted murderer in Victorian London
- Jan Lipski, bishop of Chełmno
- Jan Józef Lipski, Polish politician and literary critic
- Jed Lipsky, American politician
- John Lipsky, American Director of the IMF (May 15, 2011), previously vice-chairman of JPMorgan
- John Lipski, American football player
- John M. Lipski, American linguist
- Josef Lipski, Polish diplomat
- Mark Lipsky, American producer
- Michael Lipsky, professor
- Oldřich Lipský, Czech filmmaker
- Pat Lipsky, American painter
- Patryk Lipski, Polish footballer
- Sam Lipski, Australian journalist
- Seth Lipsky, American founder and editor of the New York Sun
- Scott Lipsky (born 1981), American tennis player
- Vladimir Lipsky, Ukrainian botanist
- A possible name of the pipe smoker, a man witnessed by Israel Schwartz shortly before the murder of Elizabeth Stride

Fictional

- Doctor Drakken (Drew Theodore P. Lipsky)
- Motor Ed (Eddy Lipsky)

== See also ==
- Lipnitsky
- Lipe, Greater Poland Voivodeship
- Lipsko County (powiat lipski), an administrative division in eastern Poland
