= Jacobi mine =

- Type: Mine
- Place of origin: Russian Empire

Service history
- In service: Russian Navy
- Used by: Russian Empire

Production history
- Designer: Moritz von Jacobi
- Designed: 1853
- Manufacturer: 1853

Specifications
- Warhead: Black Powder
- Warhead weight: 14 kilograms (31 lb)

The Jacobi mine was an early naval mine designed in 1853 by German born, Russian engineer Moritz von Jacobi. It was employed by Russia, in the Baltic Campaign of the Crimean War.

== Mine ==
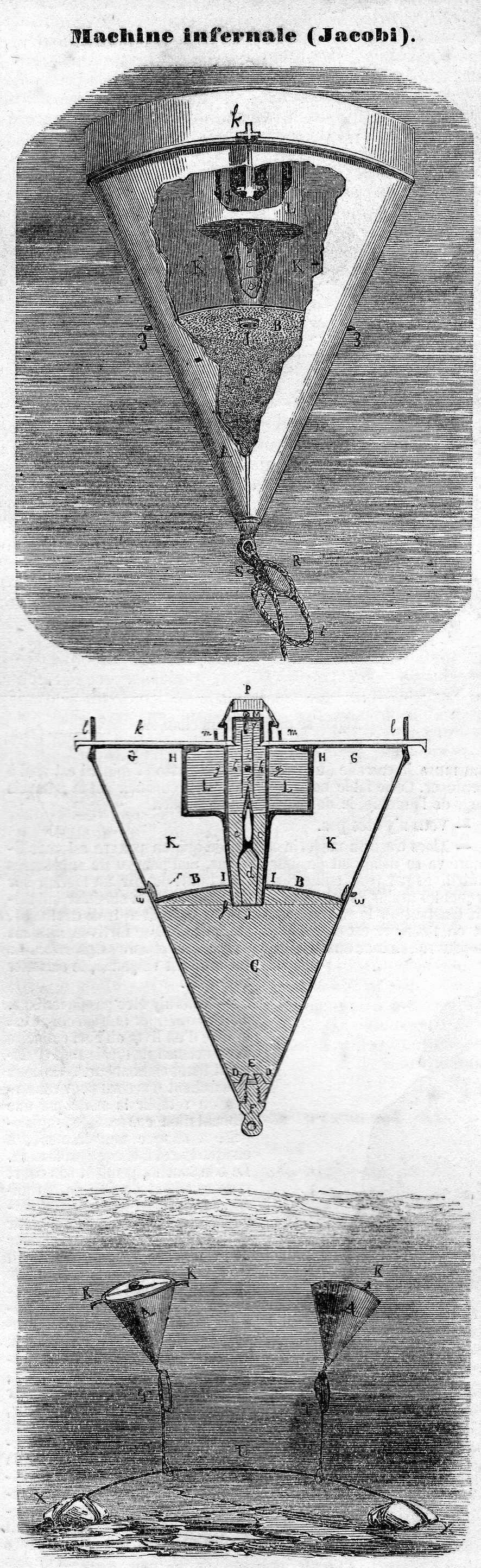
Jacobi naval mine

The German-born Russian engineer Moritz von Jacobi designed the Jacobi naval mine in 1853. An anchor tied the mine to the seabed; a cable connected it to a galvanic cell which powered it from the shore, the power of its explosive charge equated to 14 kilograms (31 lb) of black powder.

In the summer of 1853 the Committee for Mines of the Ministry of War of the Russian Empire approved the production of the Jacobi mine. What became the Crimean War formally started between the Russian Empire and the Ottoman Empire in October 1853. France and Great Britain declared war on Russia in March 1854. In 1854 the Russians laid 60 Jacobi mines in the vicinity of the Forts Pavel and Alexander (Kronstadt), in order to deter the British Baltic Fleet and its allied French fleet from attacking them. (The Royal Navy arrived in the Baltic in April 1854; the French force in June 1854.) The Jacobi mines gradually phased out their direct competitors, the Nobel mines, on the insistence of admiral Fyodor Litke.

The Russians bought their Nobel mines from the Russia-based Swedish industrialist Immanuel Nobel, who had entered into collusion with Russian Minister of the Navy, Prince Alexander Sergeyevich Menshikov. Despite their high cost (100 Russian rubles), the Nobel mines proved fault-prone, exploding during the laying process, failing to explode, or detaching from their wires and drifting uncontrollably; the British subsequently disarmed at least 70 of them.

In 1855 Russia laid 301 more Jacobi mines around Kronstadt and Lisy Nos; British ships did not dare to approach them.

== Notes ==
Citations
