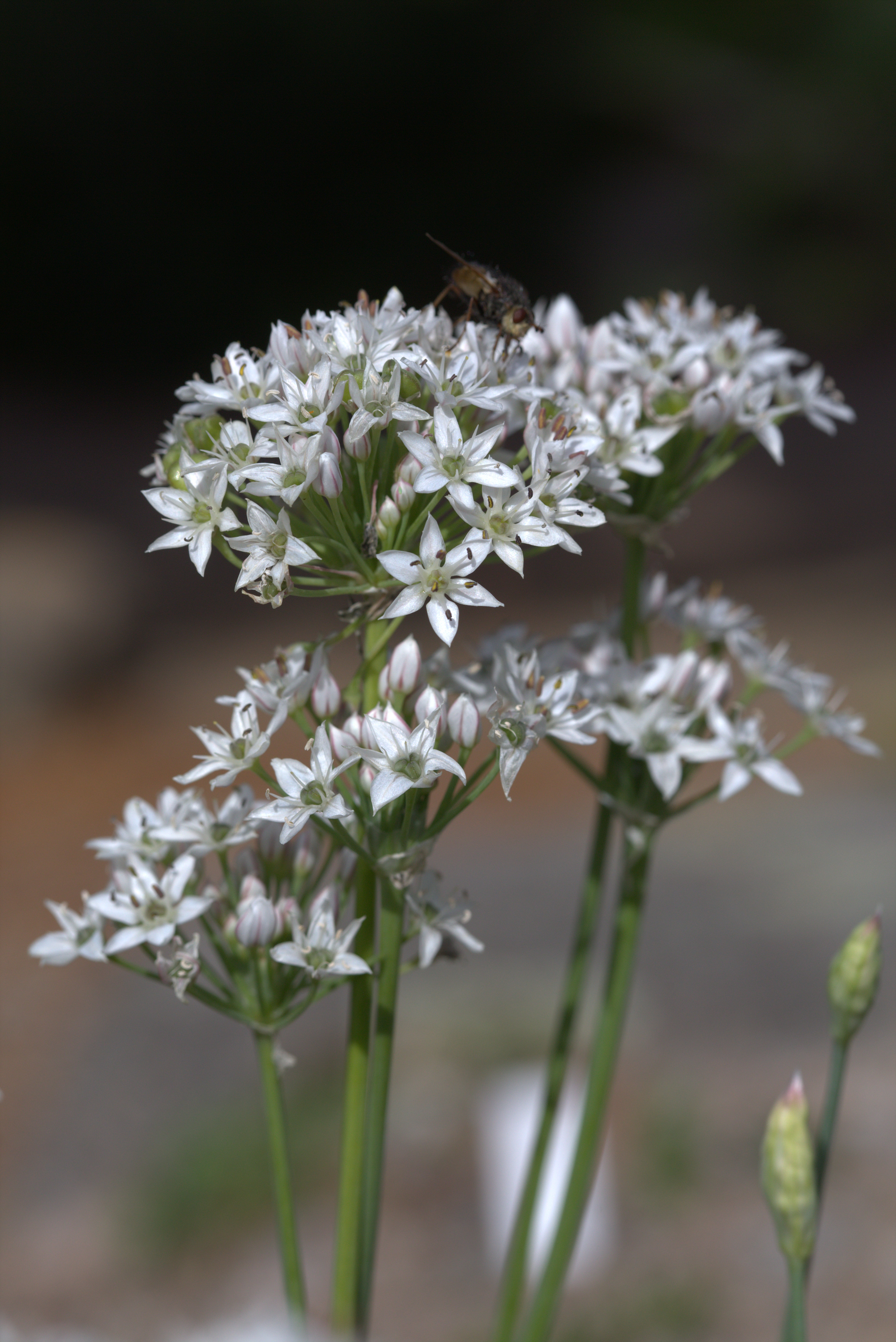

Scientific classification
- Kingdom: Plantae
- Clade: Tracheophytes
- Clade: Angiosperms
- Clade: Monocots
- Order: Asparagales
- Family: Amaryllidaceae
- Subfamily: Allioideae
- Genus: Allium
- Subgenus: A. subg. Reticulatobulbosa
- Species: A. barsczewskii

Binomial name
- Allium barsczewskii Lipsky

Synonyms
- Allium barsczewskii f. niveum Krassovsk.; Allium barsczewskii f. violaceum Krassovsk.

= Allium barsczewskii =

Species of flowering plant

Allium barsczewskii is a plant species native to Kazakhstan, Kyrgyzstan, Uzbekistan, Tajikistan, Iran, Afghanistan and Pakistan. It is about 50 cm tall with pink flowers.
