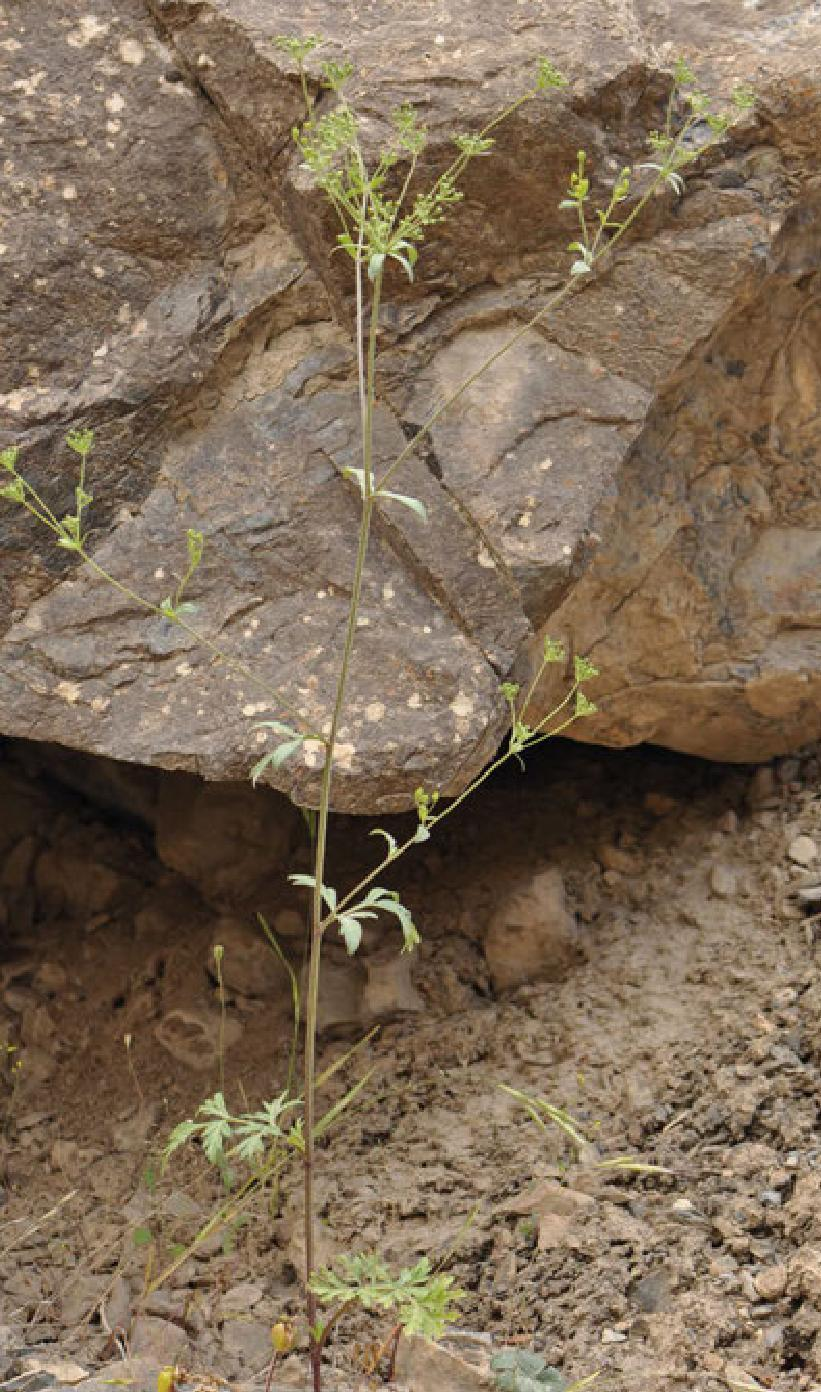

Scientific classification
- Kingdom: Plantae
- Clade: Tracheophytes
- Clade: Angiosperms
- Clade: Eudicots
- Clade: Asterids
- Order: Apiales
- Family: Apiaceae
- Subfamily: Apioideae
- Tribe: Pleurospermeae
- Genus: Korshinskia; Lipsky

= Korshinskia =

Genus of plants

Korshinskia is a genus of flowering plants belonging to the family Apiaceae. It is also in the Tribe Pleurospermeae.

Its native range is Central Asia and Afghanistan. It is found in the countries of Afghanistan, Iran, Iraq, Kyrgyzstan, Tajikistan, Turkmenistan and Uzbekistan.

The genus name of Korshinskia is in honour of Sergéi Korzhinski (1861–1900), a Russian botanist who studied plant distribution, professor at the university in Tomsk and then he later worked at a botanical garden and botanical museum in Saint Petersburg. It was first described and published in Trudy Imp. S.-Peterburgsk. Bot. Sada Vol.18 on page 59 in 1900.

== Species ==
According to Kew;

- Korshinskia assyriaca (Freyn & Bornm.) Pimenov & Kljuykov
- Korshinskia kopetdaghensis (Korovin) Pimenov & Kljuykov
- Korshinskia olgae (Regel & Schmalh.) Lipsky
- Korshinskia rapifera (Gilli) Podlech & Rech.f.
