= Kronstadt Fortress =

- Кронштадтская крепость
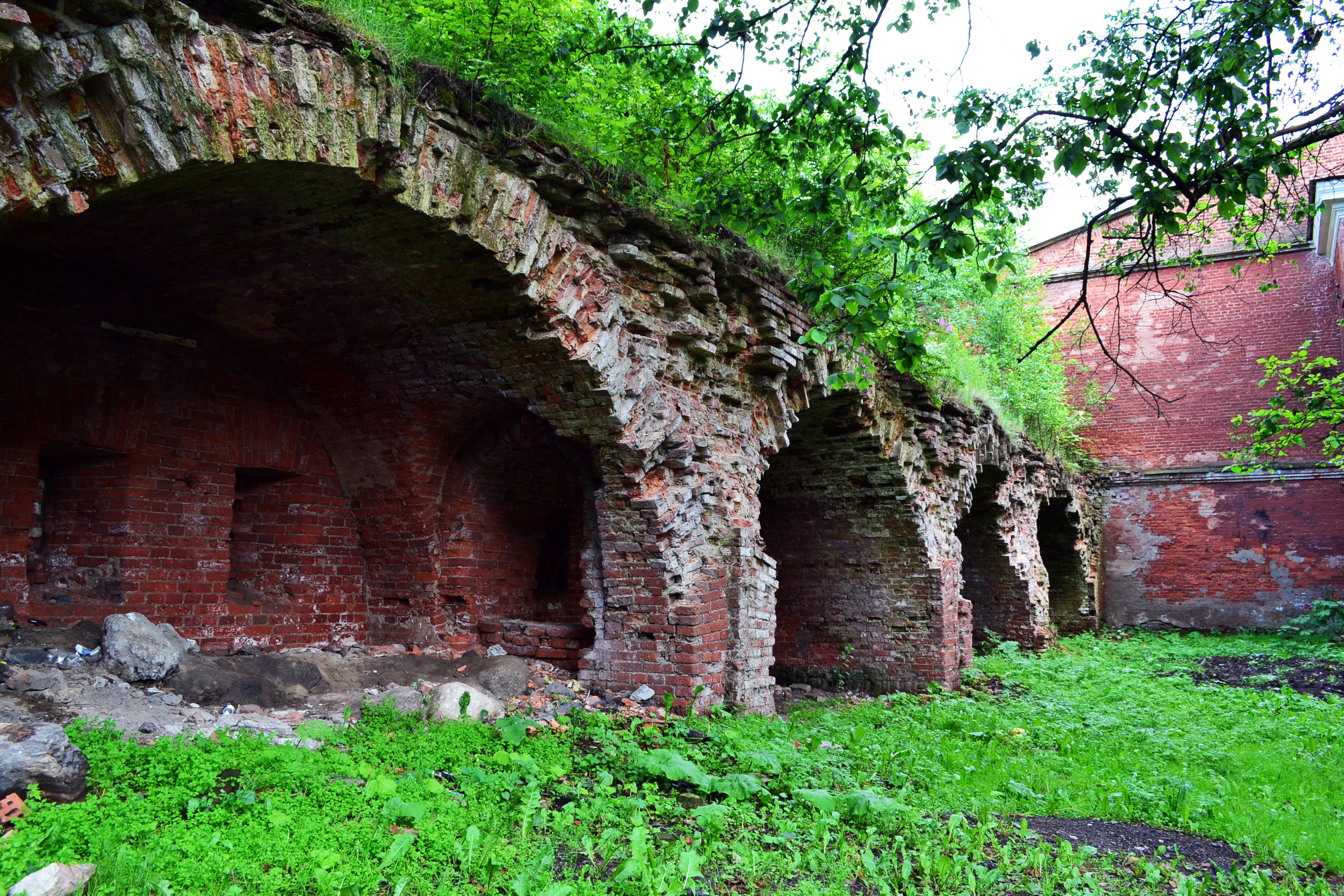
- Defensive wall of the Kronstadt Fortress
- Interactive map of Kronstadt Fortress
- Location: Russia, Kronstadt City, Vosstaniya Street, Zosimov Street, Leningradskaya Street, Manuilsky Street
- Coordinates: 59°59′37″N 29°47′20″E
- Designer: Peter I (Founder)
- Type: Monument of history and architecture. Citadel Object of Cultural Heritage of the Peoples of the Russian Federation of Federal Significance. Registration No. 781721018710006 (Unified State Register of Cultural Heritage Objects). Object No. 7810260000 (Wikigid Database) World Heritage Site; Historic Centre of Saint Petersburg and Related Groups of Monuments. Defensive Installations of the Fortress of Kronstadt; No. 540–003 in the list of World Heritage Sites; Criteria: I, II, IV, VI; Region: Europe and North America; Inclusion: 1990 (14th Session)
- Beginning date: 1723, 1825–1839 (Construction)

The Kronstadt Fortress is an architectural and historical monument of the 18th–19th centuries in Saint Petersburg, Russia. Only the Northern Wall of the fortress, located in the center of Kronstadt along Vosstaniya Street, which was built in the 19th century along the already existing, but not long before, rebuilt fortress, has survived in good condition.

== History ==
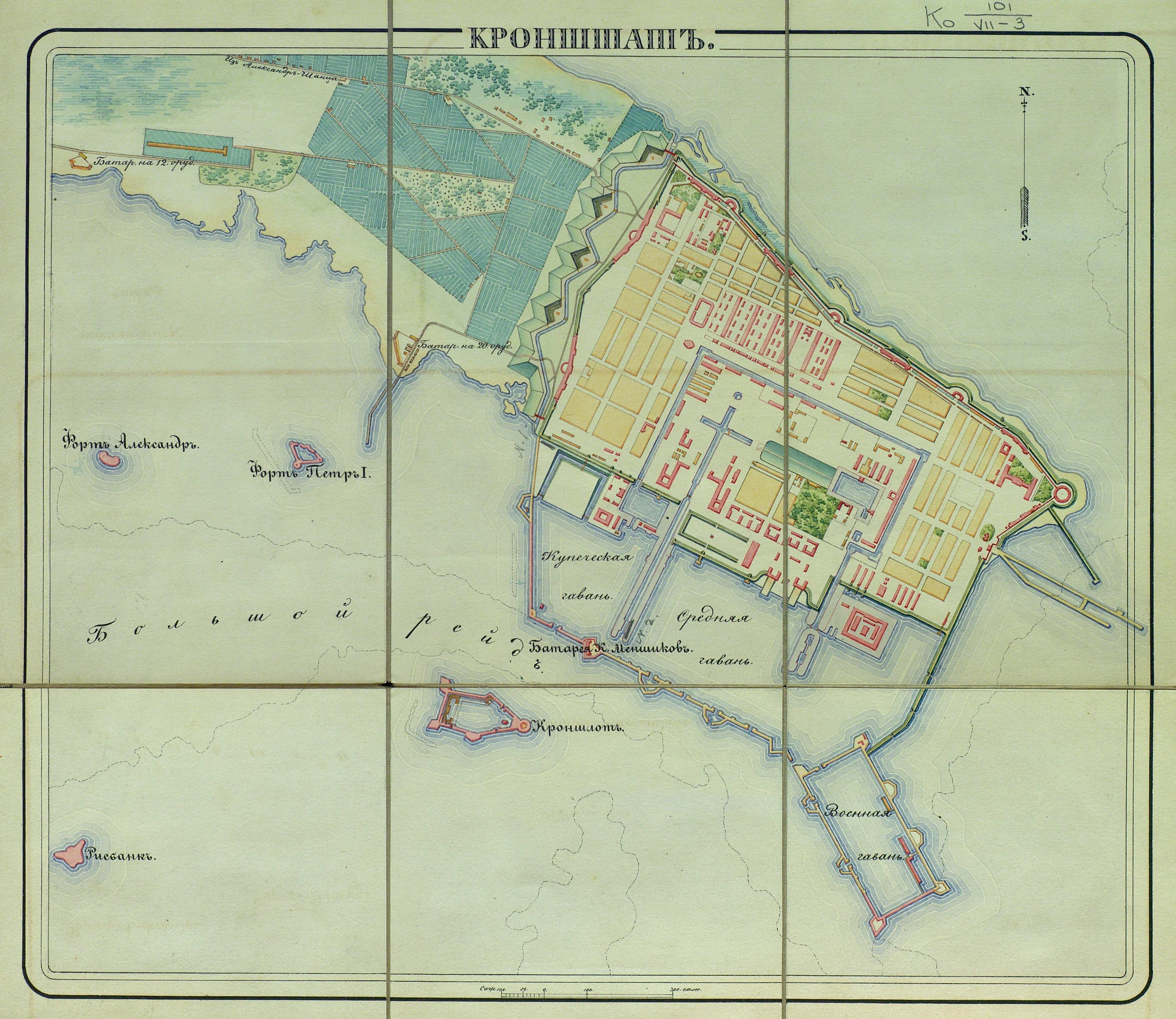
Atlas of Fortresses of the Russian Empire (About 1830)

=== Wooden Fortress ===
In November 1703, the first foreign ship of the Dutch skipper Vybes came to Saint Petersburg, delivering salt and wine. The skipper received the prize announced by Peter I – 500 gold. And on 22 June 1715, Peter I solemnly met 45 Dutch and English merchant ships at once. The need for the construction of spacious and convenient harbors for anchorage and unloading of ships became obvious. To speed up the matter, Peter I appointed the governors personally responsible for carrying out work in the areas allocated to them, for which he summoned them to Kronstadt. In March 1719, the construction of the Merchant Harbor was completed.

The construction of the fortress began twenty years after the construction of the Kronstadt forts began, and ended at the end of the 19th century.

The general plan of construction on the island, which included a plan for the development of the city, was approved by Peter I in 1721. The city was to be surrounded by a fortress fence with a bastion outline from the west, north and east. On the south side, the city was to be protected by harbor walls.

On 18 October 1723, Peter personally laid the foundation stone of the fortress, which was named Kronstadt. The fronts of the fortress fence were located according to the Kegorn system (under Peter II, it was proposed to build these fronts according to the simple bastion scheme of Vauban). The soil for the embankment on which the construction was carried out was mined by hand on the mainland. Extensive fortification works were carried out on top of the embankment: a wall was built, cannons were placed, barracks and towers were created. The fortress was armed with 358 cannons, 11 howitzers and 19 mortars, of which 257 guns defended the fairway. The garrison numbered 71 officers and 2664 lower ranks.

To facilitate the transport of goods within the city, canals and docks were built, after which the city turned into a first–class shipyard. For residential buildings, plots were allocated – for ordinary citizens an area of 6 acres (32x12 meters), for noble ones – the same length, but a width chosen at will.

Soon after the death of Peter I, almost all work in the fortress came under the control of Field Marshal Burkhard Minich (until his resignation in 1740). Since 1727, this "Oberdirector Over the Fortifications of the Russian Empire" was directly subordinate to the Military Collegium. He developed a new state of Russian fortresses, where special attention was paid to Kronstadt.

In 1734, as an experiment, work began on replacing the wooden harbor fences with stone ones. However, due to a shortage of masons and the outbreak of war with Turkey, these works were curtailed three years later. The October storm of 1757 again caused significant damage to the fortifications. Again, the question arose about the beginning of stone construction, but the calculation of the costs showed that restoration work using wood has a 20 times lower cost, which delayed work in stone for a quarter of a century.

=== Stone Fortress ===
On 5 April 1784, Admiral Greig signed a plan for the arrangement of the Admiralty in Kronstadt. At the direction of Catherine II, an authoritative commission reviewed it, and on 29 January 1785, the empress signed a rescript instructing Greig to begin the transfer of the Admiralty from Saint Petersburg to Kronstadt. The plan drawn up by Greig largely determined the development of the city with office and residential buildings, warehouses and hospitals.

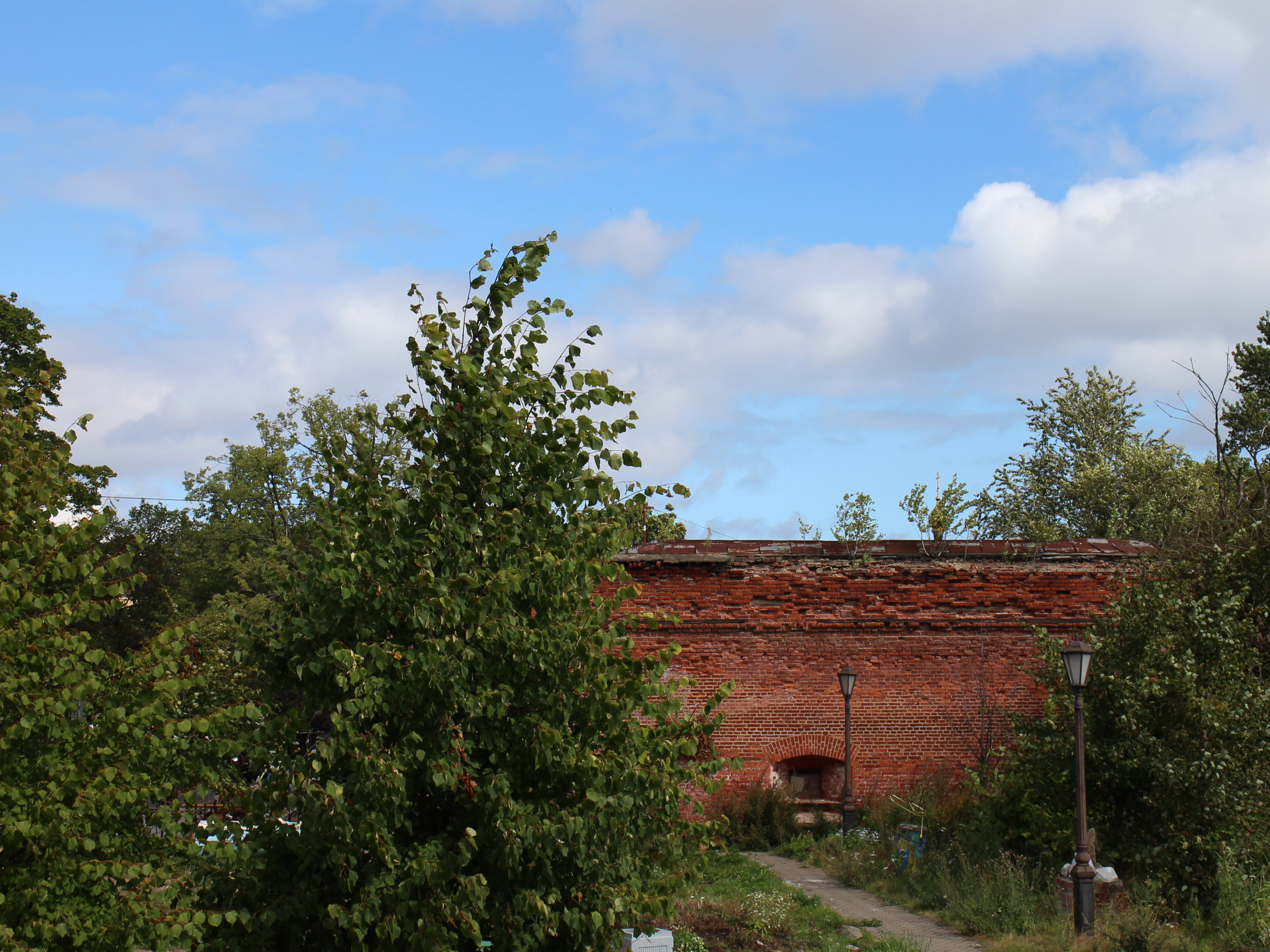
Fortress Wall at the Saint Petersburg Gate

At last, stone construction began in the fortress. The harbor was also dredged, and prisoners were used as labor.

=== Flood of 1824. Restoration of the Fortress ===
During the catastrophic flood in November 1824, almost the entire surface of the island, with the exception of a few hills outside the city, was under water. By the evening of 7 November, the Kronstadt Fortress practically ceased to exist. The fortifications were destroyed, the weapons were washed away by the waves. The disaster struck suddenly, as a result, many soldiers who were not removed from their posts were killed.

Count Sukhtelen, inspector of the Engineering Department, creator of the General Staff of the Russian Armed Forces, urgently created a project for city stone fortifications. Under the leadership of engineer–lieutenant colonel Lvov, urgent restoration work began, which was carried out around the clock. Most of the work was completed by the summer of 1826.

In 1827, the city plan was re-approved, not much different from the old one.

== Description of the fortress ==
After the completion of work on strengthening the city's defenses, it began to resemble an irregular quadrangle. On the land side of Kotlin Island, it was protected by a wall with towers and escarpment.

From the west, the city was covered by an escarpment wall, which was partially replaced by the walls of the 1st Western (Citadel) defensive barracks with a half–tower (built in 1826–1828, rebuilt in 1903–1906), as well as the 2nd Western (Kronstadt) defensive barracks (built in 1826–1829 and rebuilt in the same years as the first). In front of the escarpment wall, the Kronverksky canal was dug, covered by a batardo from the north and south.

The northern city defenses were formed by four Northern Defensive Barracks, built at different times from 1831 to 1871, some of which were equipped with semi–towers. To the east was the fifth, the Eastern Defense Barracks.

From the side of the sea, the city was protected by breakwaters with platforms intended for placing cannons, as well as by the Knyaz Menshikov battery protecting the entrance to Srednaya and Kupecheskaya harbors.

Lunettes were located to the west of the kronverk: the Den lunette (named after General Den) east of the modern city cemetery and the lunette in the area of the former torpedo boat base – Litke Base, next to which a container terminal is currently being created.

Until now, a number of barracks and the Northern Wall of the fortress have survived along Vosstaniya Street and partly along Zosimov Street to the Kronstadt Gate.

=== Complex of mortar batteries ===
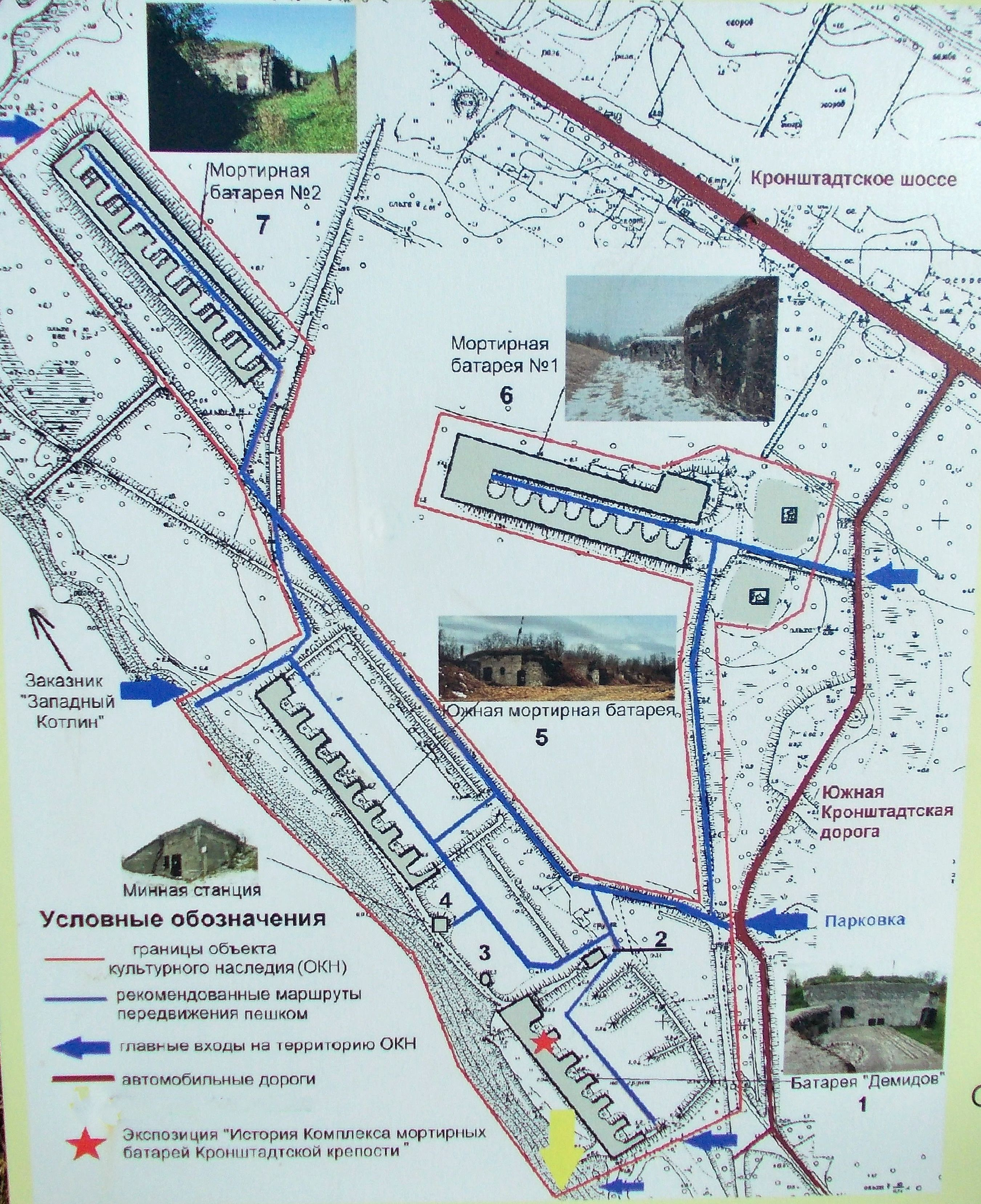
Map of the mortar battery complex

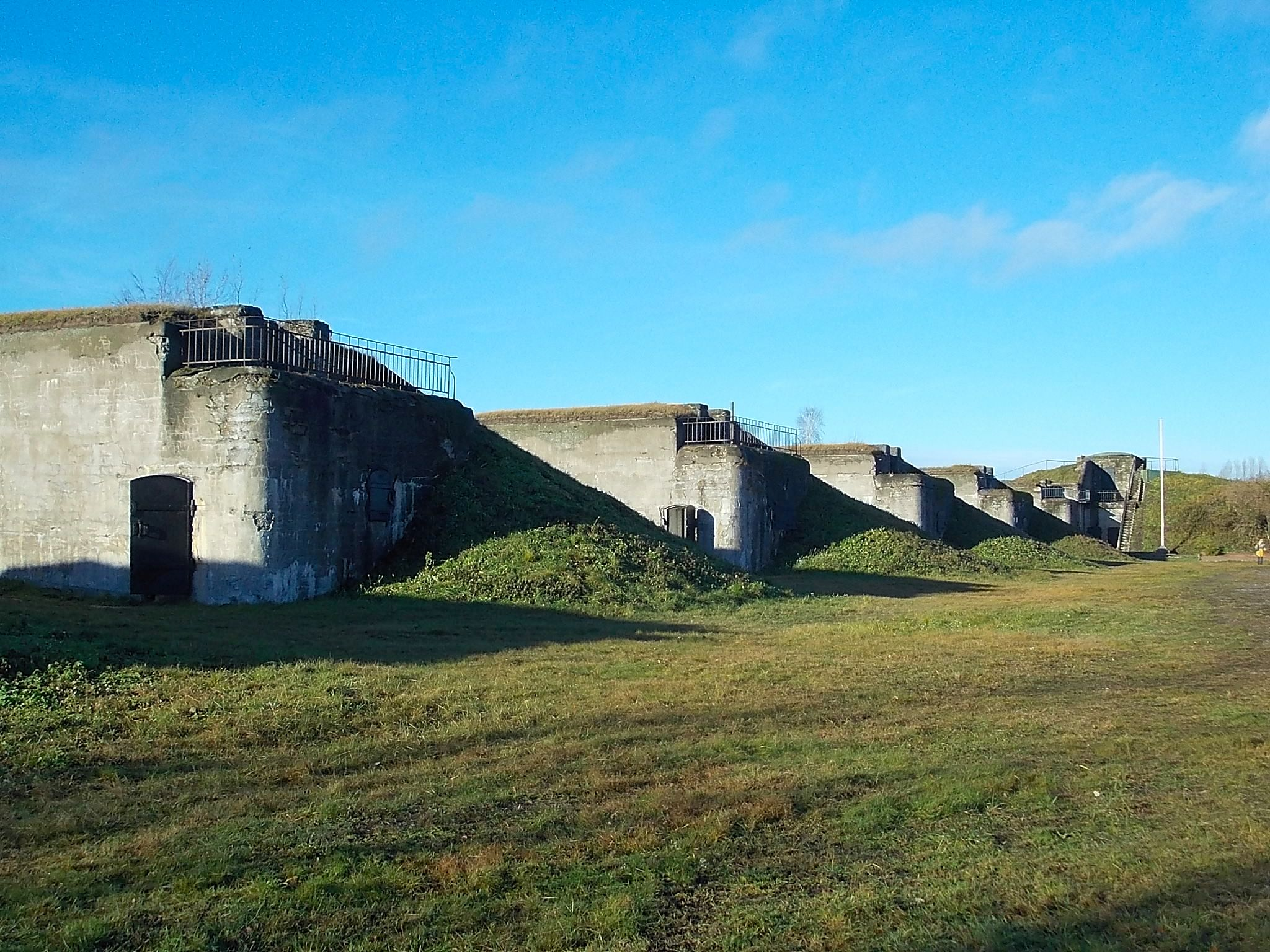
Demidov Battery

The complex of mortar batteries of the Kronstadt Fortress is a cultural heritage site and is located in the western part of Kotlin Island. The complex includes:

- Demidov battery with a casemate for a kerosene engine and a rangefinder pavilion. 1902–1905. Engineer Nikolay Baranov;
- Southern mortar battery. 1902–1905. Engineer Nikolay Baranov;
- Mortar battery No. 1 with rangefinder pavilions. 1893–1902. Engineers Vladimir Kukharsky, Leonid Kapitsa;
- Mortar battery No. 2. 1902–1906. Engineers V. F. Walter, N. P. Yudenich.

== Current state ==
The list of monuments of history and architecture protected by the state includes the following structures:

- Defensive wall on Vosstaniya street;
- Northern defensive barracks No. 1–5 on Vosstaniya Street;
- Northern semi–towers No. 1–3 on Vosstaniya Street;
- Western defensive barracks No. 1–2 on Zosimov Street;
- Protective dam No. 1;
- An earthen rampart, a defensive ditch, a scarp wall, a southern and northern batardo on Zosimov Street near the Kronverksky Canal;
- Eastern defensive barracks and northeastern tower on Manuilsky street;
- Guardhouse building on Leningradskaya Street.

== Transport ==
Buses No. 2, 3, 175. Suburban buses No. 101, 215 also go through the Kronstadt Gate to the Kronstadt highway.

== Sea forts ==
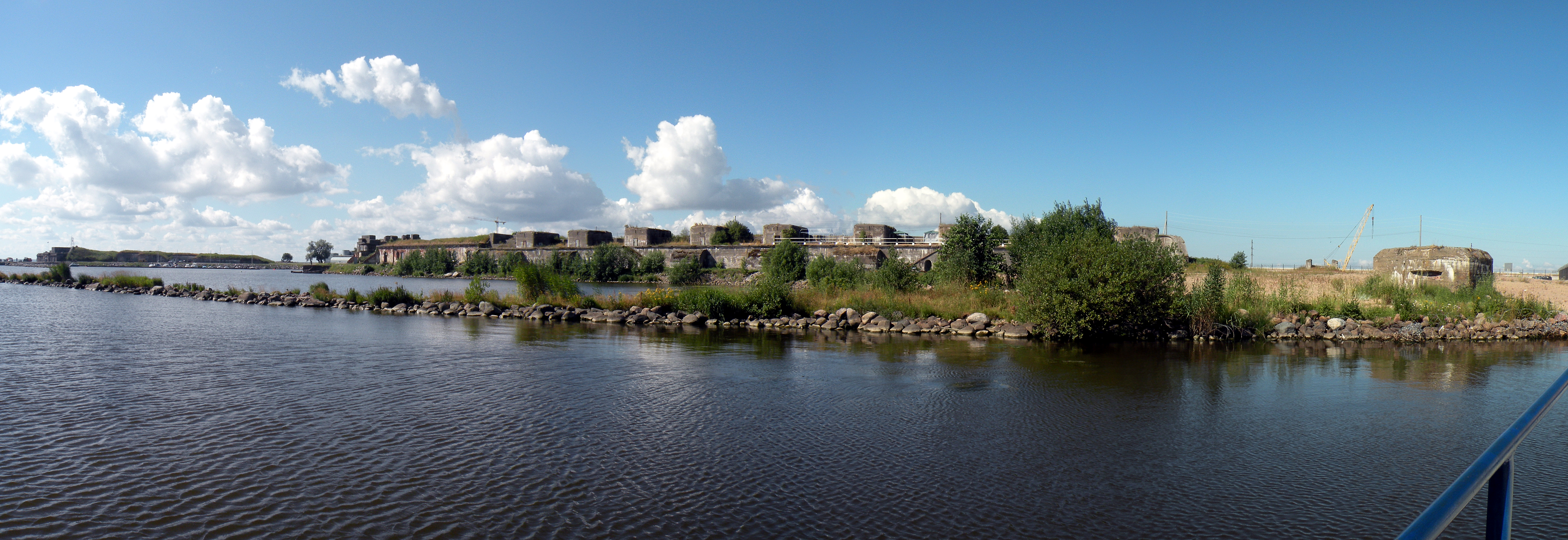
Fort Konstantin

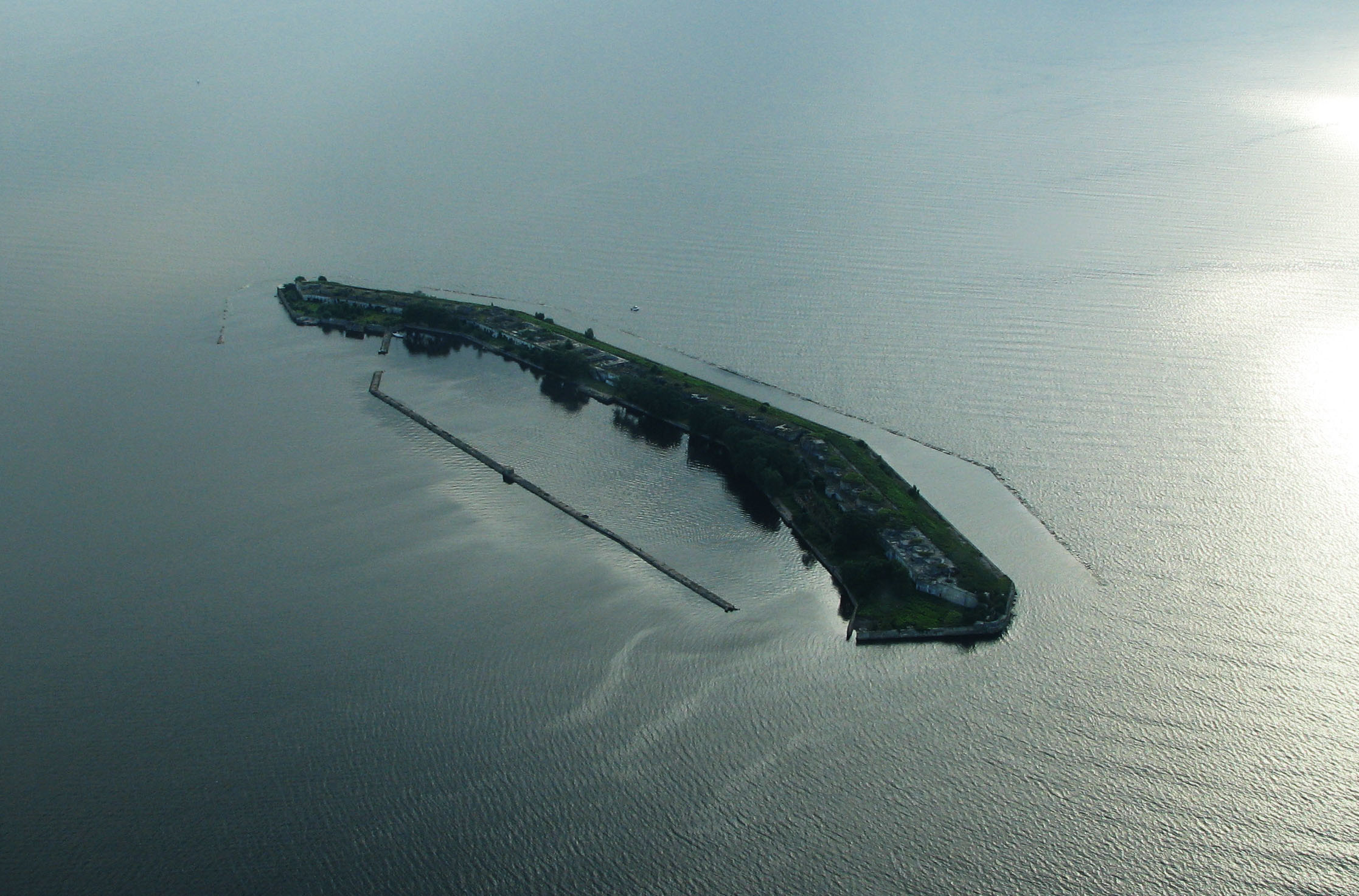
Fort Totleben

The Kronstadt Fortress sea forts comprise a historic chain of 19 fortifications built on artificial islands. Key sea forts:

- Kronshlot: The oldest fort, founded in May 1704 on a wooden-frame caisson filled with stones to guard the main southern shipping channel.
- Fort Alexander I (Plague Fort): A striking three-tier oval granite structure built in the 1840s, later used as a plague research laboratory in the late 19th and early 20th centuries.
- Fort Konstantin: One of the largest southern defense works, now partially restored and accessible via land with a yacht club and exhibits.
- Fort Totleben and Fort Obruchev: Massive, highly advanced early 20th-century artillery complexes protecting the northern fairway.
- Fort Peter I: An early key companion to Kronshlot sitting in the middle of the southern roadstead.

== Sources ==
- City Names Today and Yesterday: Petersburg Toponymy / Compilers Svetlana Alekseeva, Alexey Vladimirovich, Alexey Erofeev and Others – 2nd Edition, Revised and Enlarged – Saint Petersburg: Lik, 1997 – 288 Pages – (Three Centuries of Northern Palmyra) – ISBN 5-86038-023-2
- Kirill Gorbachevich, Evgeny Khablo. Why Are They Named So? About the Origin of the Names of Streets, Squares, Islands, Rivers and Bridges of Saint Petersburg – Saint Petersburg: Norint, 2002 – 353 Pages – ISBN 5-7711-0019-6
- Architects of Saint Petersburg. 20th Century / Compiled by Valery Isachenko; Editors Yu. Artemyeva, S. Prokhvatilova – Saint Petersburg: Lenizdat, 2000 – 720 Pages – ISBN 5-289-01928-6
