= Moritz von Jacobi =

German-Russian electrical engineer and physicist (1801–1874)

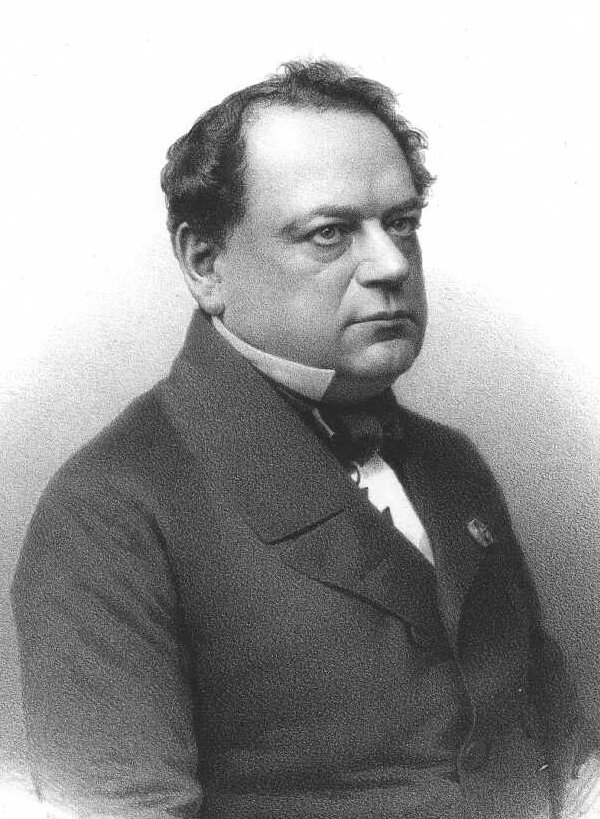
- Jacobi in 1856
- Born: Moritz Hermann von Jacobi; 21 September 1801; Potsdam, Margraviate of Brandenburg, Kingdom of Prussia, Holy Roman Empire
- Died: 10 March 1874 (aged 72); Saint Petersburg, Russian Empire
- Known for: Advancing the electric motor; Advancing electroplating; Formulating maximum power transfer theorem; Inventing the electric boat; Inventing electrotyping; Inventing the Jacobi mine
- Relatives: Carl Gustav Jacob Jacobi (brother)
- Awards: Demidov Prize (1840)
- Scientific career
- Fields: Physics
- Workplaces: Russian Academy of Sciences

Moritz Hermann von Jacobi (German: [ˈmoːʁɪts fɔn jaˈkoːbi]; 21 September 1801 – 10 March 1874), also known as Boris Semyonovich Yakobi (Russian: Борис Семёнович Якоби), was a German-Russian electrical engineer and physicist.

== Motors ==
Jacobi began to study magnetic motors in 1834. In 1835 moved to Dorpat (now Tartu, Estonia) to lecture at Dorpat University. He moved to Saint Petersburg in 1837 to research the usage of electromagnetic forces for moving machines at the Russian Academy of Sciences. He investigated the power of an electromagnet in motors and generators. While studying the transfer of power from a battery to an electric motor, he deduced the maximum power theorem. Jacobi tested the output of motors by determining the amount of zinc consumed by the battery. With the financial assistance of Tsar Nicholas I, in 1839 Jacobi constructed a 28-foot electric motor boat powered by battery cells, which carried 14 passengers on the Neva river against the current at three miles per hour.

== Jacobi's law ==
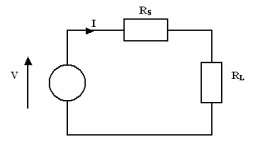
Circuit Diagram

Power is being transferred from the source,
with voltage V and resistance R_{S},
to a load with resistance R_{L},
resulting in a current I. I is simply
the source voltage divided by the total

circuit resistance

The law known as the maximum power theorem states:

Maximum power is transferred when the internal resistance of the source equals the resistance of the load, when the external resistance can be varied, and the internal resistance is constant.

The transfer of maximum power from a source with a fixed internal resistance to a load, the resistance of the load must be the same as that of the source. This law is of use when driving a load such as an electric motor from a battery.

== Electrotyping and telegraphy ==
In 1838 he discovered galvanoplastics, or electrotyping, a method of making printing plates by electroplating. The way this works is analogous to a battery acting in reverse. The stereotype was an impression taken from a form of movable lead type and used for printing instead of the original type. This technique is used in relief printing.

He also worked on the development of the electric telegraph. In 1842-1845 he built a telegraph line between Saint Petersburg and Tsarskoe Selo using an underground cable. In 1867 he was a Russian delegate to the Commission on Measurement Units at the Paris World's Fair. He was a strong proponent of the metric system.

== Naval mine ==
In 1853 Jacobi developed the Jacobi naval mine.

The mine was tied to the sea bottom by an anchor, a cable connected it to a galvanic cell which powered it from the shore. The power of its explosive charge was equal to 14 kilograms (31 lb) of black powder. Its production was approved by the Committee for Mines of the Ministry of War of the Russian Empire.

In 1854 60 Jacobi mines were laid in the vicinity of the Forts Pavel and Alexander (Kronstadt).

== Family ==
Von Jacobi's brother was the mathematician Carl Gustav Jacob Jacobi.

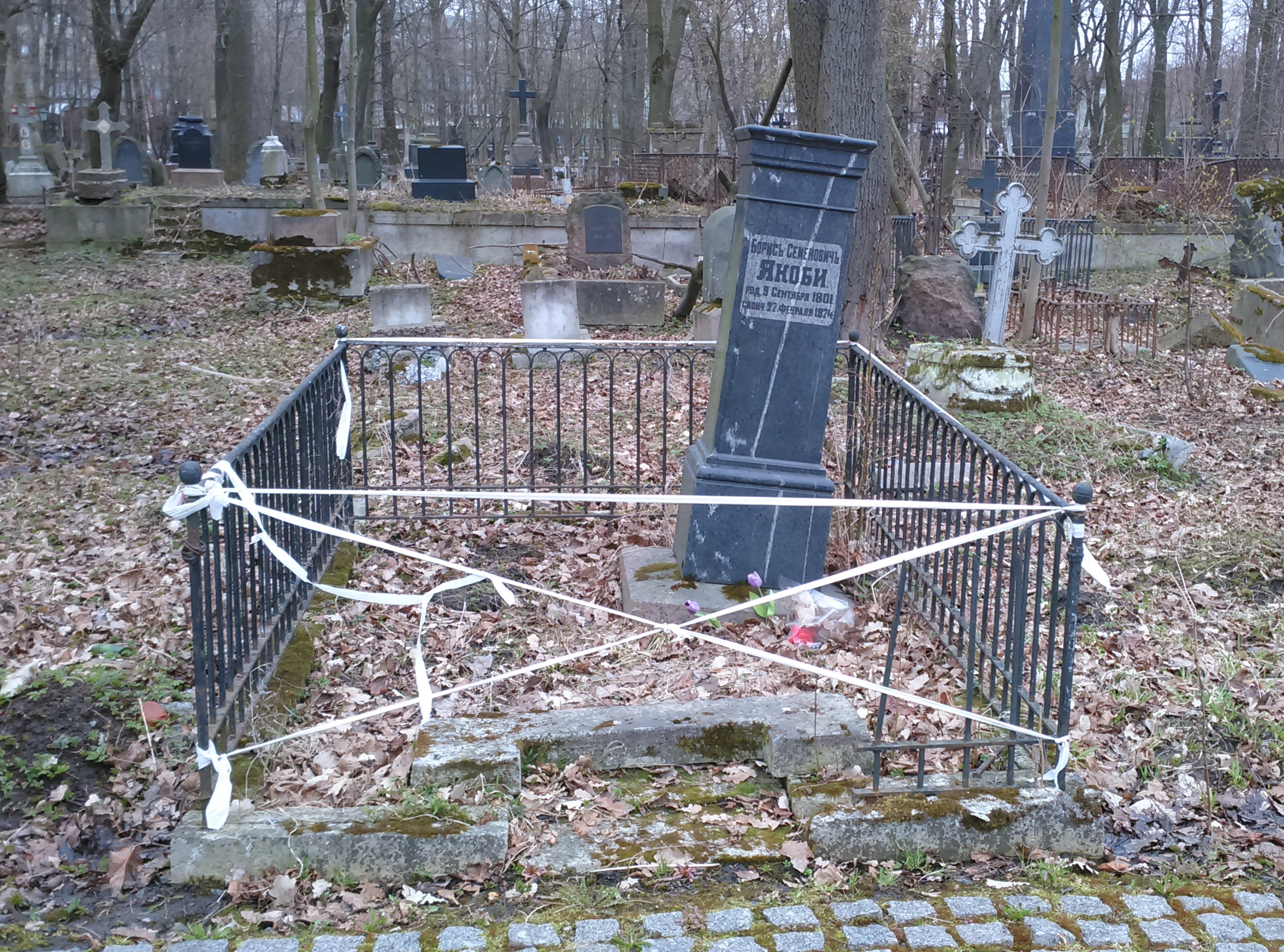
Von Jacobi's tomb, from wife and children

Jacobi was born into an Ashkenazi Jewish family.

== Sources ==
- "Якоби, Мориц-Герман" . Brockhaus and Efron Encyclopedic Dictionary (in Russian). 1906.
