= Ladyginia =

Scientific classification
- Kingdom: Plantae
- Clade: Tracheophytes
- Clade: Angiosperms
- Clade: Eudicots
- Clade: Asterids
- Order: Apiales
- Family: Apiaceae
- Genus: Ladyginia; Lipsky

Synonyms
- Spongiosyndesmus Gilli

Genus of plants

Ladyginia is a genus of flowering plants belonging to the family Apiaceae.

It is native to parts of Central Asia. It is found in Afghanistan, Tajikistan, Turkmenistan and Uzbekistan.

The genus name of Ladyginia is in honour of Veniamin Fedorovich Ladygin (1860–1932), a Russian botanist who collected in East Asia. It was first described and published in Trudy Imp. S.-Peterburgsk. Bot. Sada Vol.23 on page 150 in 1904.

== Known species ==
According to Kew:

- Ladyginia afghanica (Gilli) Pimenov & Kljuykov
- Ladyginia bucharica Lipsky
- Ladyginia gigantea (Leute) Pimenov & Kljuykov
