= Lipnicki =

Lipnicki, feminine: Lipnicka is a Polish surname. Russian variant: Lipnitsky/Lipnitskaya. Notable people with the surname include:

- Anita Lipnicka (born 1975), Polish singer and songwriter
- Jonathan Lipnicki (born 1990), American actor
- Paweł Lipnicki (born 1964), Polish actor, vocalist, television presenter, screenwriter, playwright
- Tomasz Lipnicki (born 1969), Polish musician, composer, vocalist and songwriter
- Wojciech Lipnicki (c. 1577–1657), Polish bishop and statesman
