= Danylo Zabolotny =

Ukrainian and Soviet epidemiologist, President of AS of the USSR (1866–1929)

- Данило Заболотний
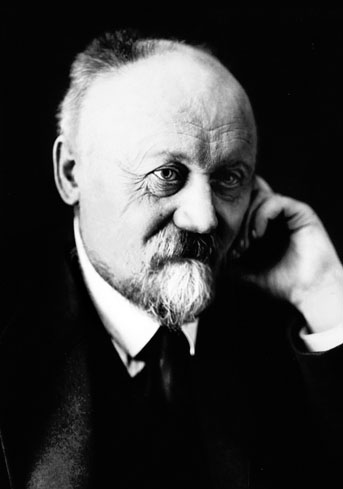
- Born: December 28, 1866; Chobotarka, Podolia Governorate, Russian Empire (now Zabolotne, Vinnytsia Oblast, Ukraine)
- Died: December 15, 1929 (aged 62); Kyiv, Ukrainian SSR, Soviet Union
- Resting place: Zabolotne
- Known for: Research in public health
- Scientific career
- Fields: Epidemiology

Danylo Kyrylovych Zabolotny (Ukrainian: Данило Кирилович Заболотний; 28 December 1866 – 15 December 1929) was a Ukrainian and Soviet epidemiologist and the founder of the world's first research department of epidemiology. In 1927, he published one of the first texts in his field, Fundamentals of Epidemiology.

== Biography ==
Zabolotny was born on 28 December 1866 in a small village to poor peasants who lived in a two-room house. His father, Kyrylo, was a former serf until the abolition of serfdom five years prior to his son being born, and was married to a woman named Yevheniia. When he was 11, his father died and his uncle took him to Rostov-on-Don, Russia. He was able to attend the gymnasium, and it became clear that he was intelligent and had a talent for the natural sciences. They came to Rostov-on-Don to stay with the brother of his mother, Makar Myronovych Sauliak, who taught natural science and geography in the city. The family then moved to Odesa in 1880, on the advice of Makar who told them to stay with another uncle named Vasyl Myronovych, where he studied at the Richelieu Lyceum.

Afterward he attended Novorossiya University, where he graduated in 1891. There, he was able to study under notable scientists such as Élie Metchnikoff, Ivan Sechenov, and Lev Tsenkovsky. He protested, as part of a student movement, against a Russian plan to do away with university autonomy, and spent three months in jail in 1883. During his imprisonment, he fell ill, which possibly saved him from expulsion from Odesa and distant exile. In 1894 he graduated from Bogomolets National Medical University. During his time at the university, he conducted research on human immunization against cholera and a sanitary evaluation of irrigation fields in Odesa. He worked as a doctor in the military hospital in Kyiv from 1895 to 1897. In 1987, he was invited to work in Paris by his former teacher Élie Metchnikoff, where he worked at the Pasteur Institute before returning to Russia in 1898. He also went to Bombay to do research in 1897 with V. Vysokovich and E. Redrov. In 1898, at the St. Petersburg Women's Medical Institute, he set up what is considered the first department specializing in bacteriology in Russia, a department he led until 1928.

During this period he also was one of three scientists (with Mikhail Gavrilovich Tartakovsky and Nikolai Mikhailovich Berestnev) who led the Special Laboratory set up in 1898 on Fort Alexander an artificial island in the Gulf of Finland near Kotlin Island, where plague vaccines and serums were produced and experiments with pathogens for the plague and cholera were done.

From 1919 to 1923 he was rector of the Odesa National Medical University, where he started what is considered the world's first Department of Epidemiology, in 1920. From 1924 to 1928 he was professor at the Military Medical Academy in Leningrad and in 1928 founded is now called the Zabolotny Institute of Microbiology and Virology, in Kyiv. In 1930, after the Soviet authorities had completed their political takeover of the National Academy of Sciences of Ukraine and pushed out Mykhailo Hrushevsky as candidate for the presidency, Zabolotny was instead given the presidency of the Academy, in 1930.

Zabolotny conducted groundbreaking research on a number of infectious diseases, including cholera, diphtheria, dysentery, plague, syphilis, and typhus, as well as on gangrene. In 1904, he in order to address sanitary issues in Russia, he wrote to Duke Peter Alexandrovich of Oldenburg criticizing the lack of sanitary laws in Russia. Zabolotny proved that the plague was indeed carried by rodents and helped develop vaccines and serums to cure the plague; his research included him drinking a living cholera culture after immunizing himself, thereby proving how effective immunization could be. He also led research missions during the third plague pandemic, in India, Arabia, Mongolia, and China. Having done extensive field work in Northern China, he was an "influential" delegate at the 1911 Mukden Conference where China, forced by the Manchurian plague that killed 60,000 people, "embrac[ed] a Western approach to medical care, with the intention of promoting public health during the first years of Chinese Republic".

He died on 15 December 1929 and was buried in the village where he was born.

Preceded by Vladimir Lipsky	President of NANU; 1928–1929	Succeeded by Oleksandr Bohomolets
