= Lipskya =

Scientific classification
- Kingdom: Plantae
- Clade: Tracheophytes
- Clade: Angiosperms
- Clade: Eudicots
- Clade: Asterids
- Order: Apiales
- Family: Apiaceae
- Subfamily: Apioideae
- Tribe: Pyramidoptereae
- Genus: Lipskya; Nevski
- Species: L. insignis

Binomial name
- Lipskya insignis (Lipsky) Nevski

Synonyms
- Anidrum insigne (Lipsky) Koso-Pol.; Hippomarathrum insignis (Lipsky) M.Hiroe; Schrenkia insignis Lipsky

Species of flowering plant

Lipskya is a monotypic genus of flowering plants belonging to the family Apiaceae. It only contains one known species, Lipskya insignis. It is also in tribe Pyramidoptereae.

Its native range is Central Asia. It is found in the countries of Tadzhikistan, Turkmenistan and Uzbekistan.

The genus name of Lipskya is in honour of Vladimir Lipsky (1863–1937), a Ukrainian scientist, botanist as well as a member of National Academy of Sciences of Ukraine (in 1922–1928, its President) and corresponding member of the USSR Academy of Sciences, and the Director of the Botanical Gardens of the Odessa University. The Latin specific epithet of insignis means significant. Both genus and species were first described and published in Trudy Bot. Inst. Akad. Nauk S.S.S.R., Series 1, Fl. Sist. Vyssh. Rast. Vol.4 on pages 271-272 in 1937.
