= Vladimir Lipsky =

Ukrainian botanist

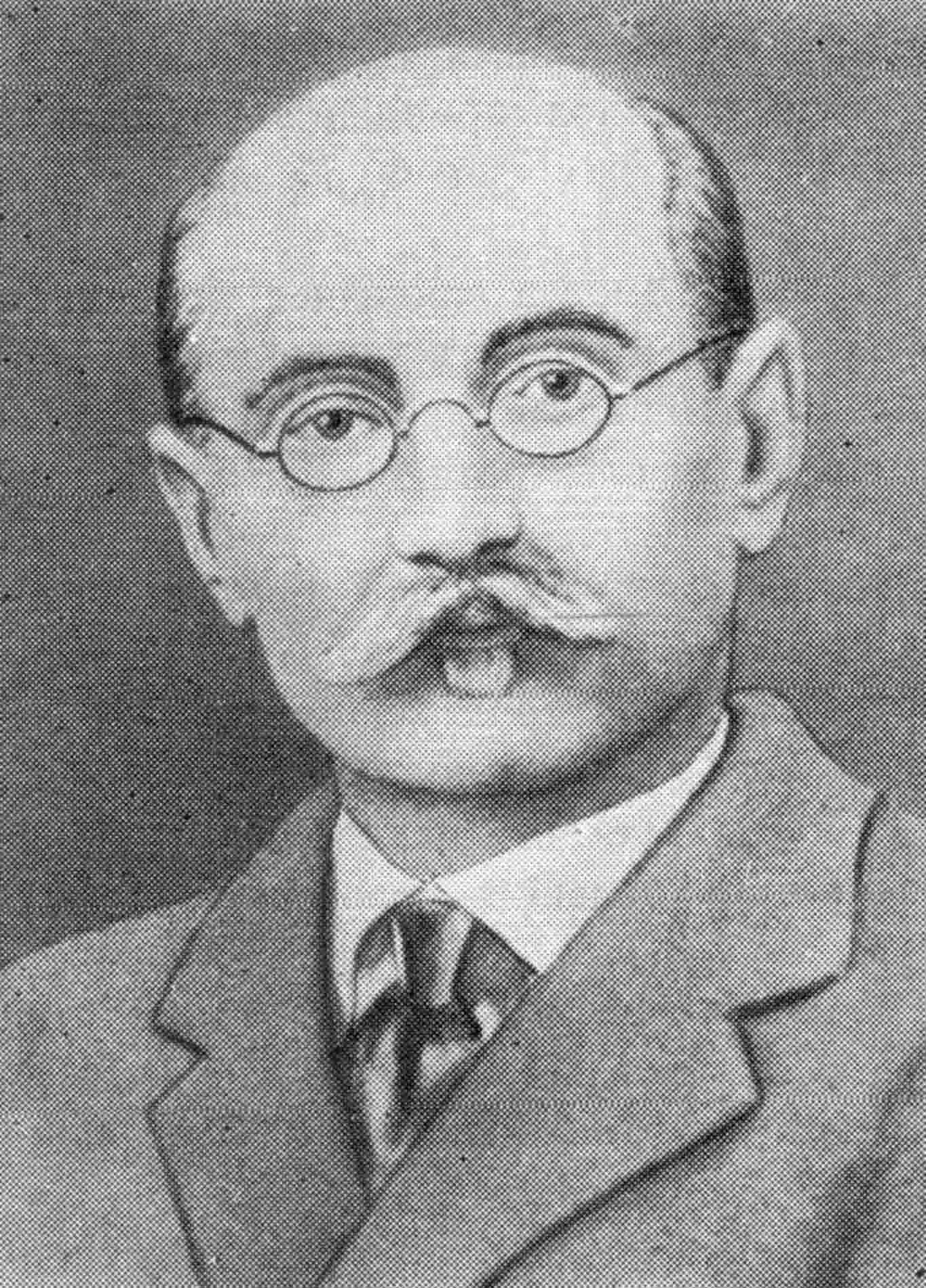
- Vladimir Lipsky
- Born: Vladimir Ippolitovich Lipsky; 11 March [O.S. ] 1863 village of Samostrely, Volyn Governorate, Russian Empire (now Rivne Oblast)
- Died: 24 February 1937 (aged 73); Odessa, Soviet Union
- Citizenship: Russian Empire, USSR
- Education: Kyiv University
- Known for: studies of plants of Central Asia and Caucasus; President of National Academy of Sciences of Ukraine (1922–1928)
- Scientific career
- Fields: botany
- Workplaces: Kyiv University, Saint Petersburg Botanical Garden, National Academy of Sciences of Ukraine, Botanical Garden of Odessa National University
- Doctoral advisor: Johannes Theodor Schmalhausen
- Doctoral students: Nikolai Grishko
- Author abbrev. (botany): Lipsky

Vladimir Ippolitovich Lipsky or Volodymyr Ipolytovych Lypsky (Russian: Владимир Ипполитович Липский; Ukrainian: Володимир Іполитович Липський; 11 March 1863 – 24 February 1937) was a Ukrainian scientist, botanist; a member of National Academy of Sciences of Ukraine (in 1922–1928, its president) and corresponding member of the USSR Academy of Sciences, and the director of the Botanical Gardens of the Odessa University.

== Birth and education ==
Vladimir was born on 11 March 1863 in the village of Samostrely (now Korets Raion of Rivne Oblast). His father, grandfather and great grandfather were clergymen.

The Lipsky family moved to Zhitomir in 1873. Vladimir studied at the Volhynian Gymnasium; he graduated from Pavlo Galagan Collegium (magna cum laude) in 1881, and Kyiv University in 1887. The formation of Vladimir Lipsky as a scientist was considerably influenced by Johannes Schmalhausen, who headed the chair of plant taxonomy and morphology.

== Career ==
From 1887 to 1894 Vladimir Lipsky worked with the Botanical Garden of Kyiv University first as conservator, then as assistant at the chair of botanics.

He took part in scientific expeditions to the Caucasus and Northern Iran from 1889.

Between 1894 and 1917, Lipsky worked with the Saint Petersburg Botanical Garden as junior and senior conservator of the herbarium, chief botanist, and eventually head of the Living Plants Department.

Lipsky participated in scientific expeditions to the Caucasus, Altai and Central Asia conducting detailed studies of the Alpine flora of the regions.

In 1917 he returned to Ukraine and actively participated in the creation of the National Academy of Sciences of Ukraine, holding the botany chair of the Ukrainian Academy of Sciences. He was the president of the academy from 1922 to 1928. Between 1928 and 1933 he was the director of the Botanical Gardens of the Odessa University in Odessa.

Lipsky conducted extensive botanical expeditions and travelled to nearly all continents except Australia and Antarctica.

== Research ==
Vladimir did research in the fields of floristics, plant taxonomy and phytogeography of plants, herbarium work, principles of organization of botanical gardens, history of botany. He became one of the first botanists to provide scientific descriptions of the flora of Indonesia, Tunisia, Algeria, and Central Asia. In particular, Vladimir Lipsky described 4 new genera, and 220 new species of plant, 45 of which are named after him. He also authored 82 printed works.

=== First Kyiv period ===
Upon graduation from the university, Vladimir participated in numerous scientific expeditions: Podolia, Bessarabia, Crimea, Caucasus and Central Asia. Lipsky's first academic work appeared in 1889: Research in Flora of Bessarabia (Russian: Исследование о флоре Бессарабии, Issledovaniye o flore Bessarabii), where, inter alia, a new species of plants was described: Valerianella bessarabica. Vladimir published a number of his reports on his expeditions at the Proceedings of Kyiv Society of Nature Researchers («Записки Київського товариства дослідників природи», Zapiski Kyivskogo Tovaristva Doslidnykiv Prirody).

Starting from 1889, Vladimir visited the Caucasus several times to research the plants of the region. The journeys resulted in the description of about 40 new species and subvarieties of plants. In order to identify distinctive character of Caucasian flora and to do comparative studies, he also visited Northern Iran. Lipsky published the results of the Caucasian flora studies in his treatise Flora of Caucasus. A Corpus of Information about Caucasian Flora for Bicentennial Period of its Research, starting from Tournefort and ending by the 19th Century («Флора Кавказа. Свод сведений о флоре Кавказа за двухсотлетний период её исследования, начиная от Турнефора и кончая XIX веком»). In particular, the book lists 4,500 species of plants and provides accurate data of their distribution. The botanist described three new genera of flowering plants: Beketowia, Orthorhiza and Schumannia. The following plants can be noted among new Caucasian plants described by Vladimir Lipsky: Dioscorea caucasica, Fagus orientalis, Levisticum caucasicum, Potentilla alexeenkoi, Tulipa caucasica, Hypericum ponticum, and many others.

=== St. Petersburg period ===
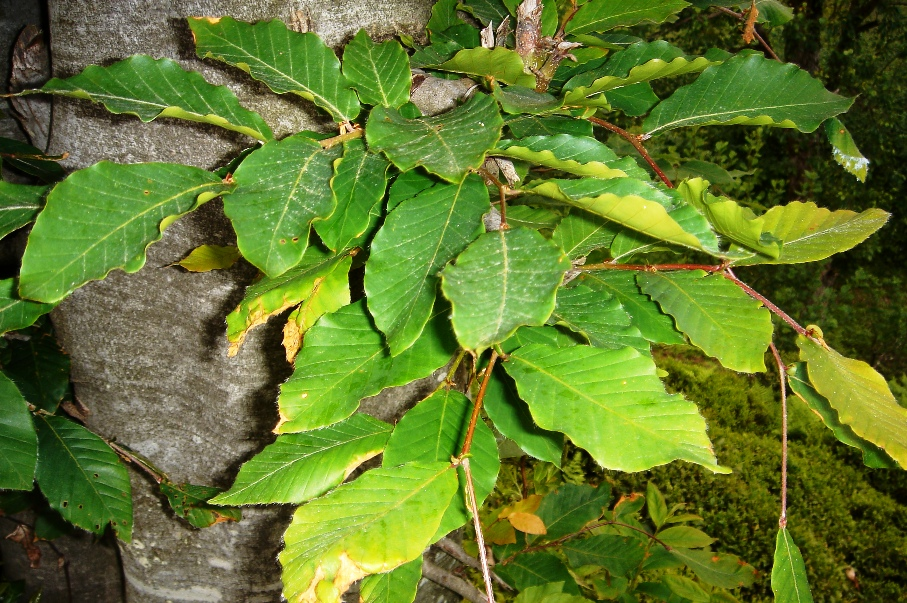
Oriental Beech (Fagus orientalis), a plant discovered and studied by Vladimir Lipsky

Starting from 1894 Lipsky worked at the botanical garden of St. Petersburg. From 1894 through 1896 he continued his studies of Caucasian plants commenced while in Kyiv. After 1896 he started researching alpine plants of Central Asia highlands. The botanist explored southern slopes of Gissar Range, Pamiro-Alai, Tian Shan, Dzungarian Alatau, Kopet Dag, Fergana Valley and Zeravshan Valley, becoming the first botanist visiting many of the areas. The expeditions resulted in more than thirty works and treatises, including:

- Materials for Flora of Central Asia («Материалы для флоры Средней Азии»);
- Flora of Central Asia, i.e. Russian Turkestan and Bukhara and Khiva Khanates («Флора Средней Азии, то есть Русского Туркестана и ханств Бухары и Хивы»);
- Mountainous Bukhara («Горная Бухара»).

In those treatises Lipsky revised botanical knowledge of the above areas, rectified errors of predecessors, and described about a hundred new species and four new genera: Korshinskia, Galagania, Koslovia, Ladyginia.

The botanist paid much attention to the history of the Petersburg Botanical Garden and its herbaria and collections. He published the results of his research in the following works:

- Herbarium of the Saint-Petersburg Botanical Garden by the End of 75th year of its Existence, 1823–1898 («Гербарий С.-Петербургского ботанического сада к концу его 75-летнего существования, 1823–1898»),
- Historical Overview of Saint-Petersburg Botanical Garden, 1713–1913 («Исторический очерк С.-Петербургского ботанического сада, 1713–1913»),
- Biographies and Literary Activities of Botanists and Persons Associated with the Botanical Garden («Биографии и литературная деятельность ботаников и лиц, соприкасавшихся с ботаническим садом»).

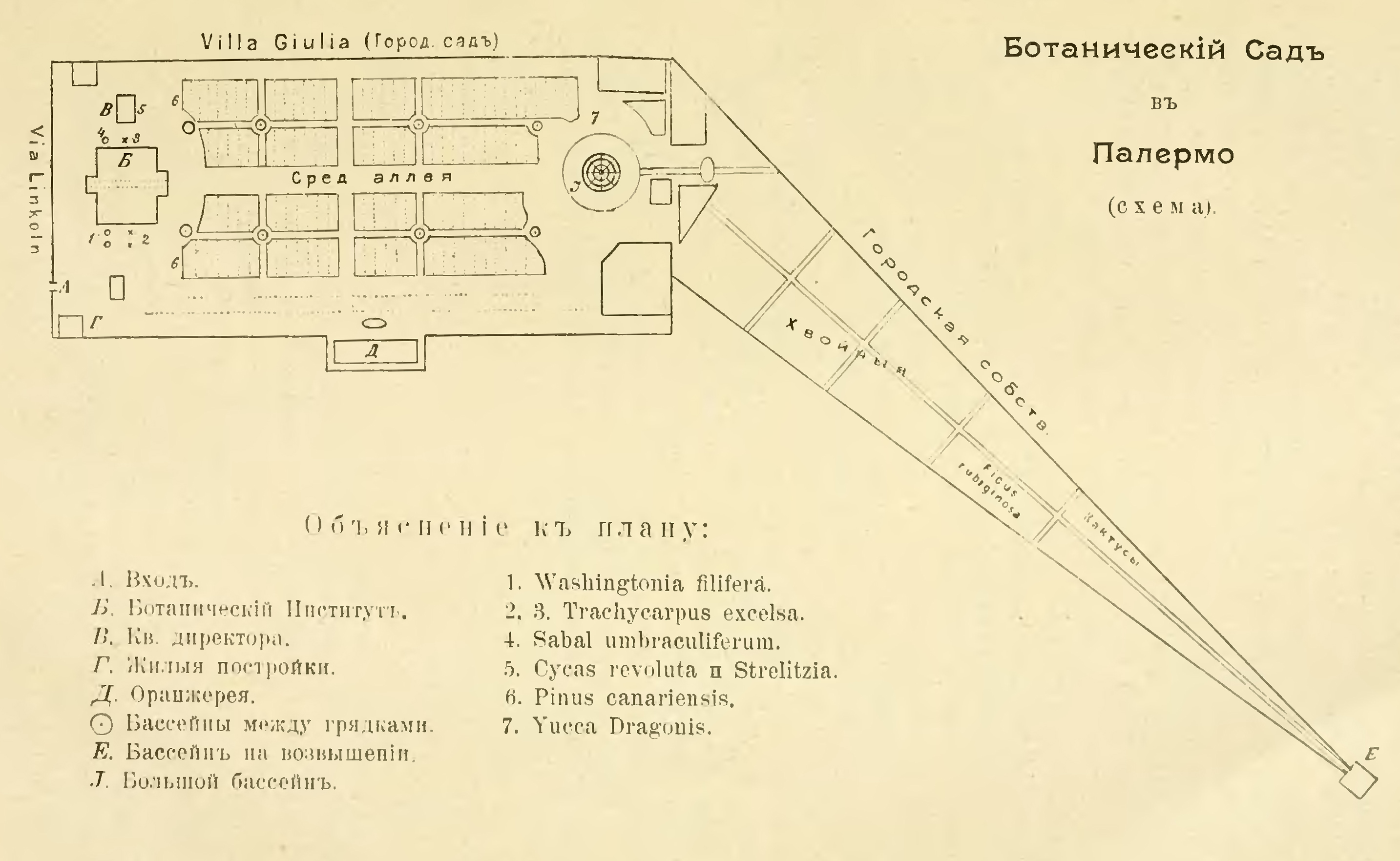
Map of the Botanical Garden in Palermo made by Vladimir Lipsky (1903)

Between 1900 and 1902 Vladimir Lipsky visited various countries studying herbaria and botanical gardens. In total, he succeeded in visiting all continents of the Earth, save for Australia and Antarctica.

=== Second Kyiv period ===
Upon recommendation of the first president of the Ukrainian Academy of Sciences (UAS) Vladimir Vernadsky, on 30 December 1918, at the meeting of the UAS 2nd Physics and Mathematics Department, elected Vladimir Lipsky a director of new botanical garden in Kyiv. In addition to managing the Botanical Garden, Vladimir also chaired Flower Plant Chair of the UAS and participated actively in creation of various academy structures, such as:

- UAS Committee for Studies of Natural Wealth of Ukraine (formed in March 1919),
- Committee for Studies of Ukrainian Fauna,
- Publishing Committee of the 2nd UAS department,
- Encyclopedic Dictionary Committee (Head),
- Committee for Audit of UAS Library.

Also he represented the academy at the Military and Industrial Committee.

In 1919 Vladimir Lipsky was unanimously elected an active member of the Ukrainian Academy of Sciences; in 1920 he was elected a member of the UAS board, and in 1921 its vice president.

Vladimir initiated creation of the UAS Botanical Garden, developed a plan of the Garden and started its actual creation in the yard of the Praesidium of the Academy of Sciences on Vladimirskaya Street in Kyiv. Today's Botanical Garden of the Academy of Sciences was formed in 1935 in the Kyiv district of Zvirynets.

In August 1919, after Stepan Timoshenko, secretary of the 2nd Department of the Ukrainian Academy of Sciences left the country, Vladimir started acting as the secretary, and in October 1921 he was elected vice president of the Ukrainian Academy of Sciences. On a general meeting of the Ukrainian Academy of Sciences held 12 June 1922, Vladimir Lipsky was elected its president.

Attempts by Soviet authorities to influence the activities of scientific institutions affected Lipsky's fate too. In order to examine the work of the Ukrainian Academy of Sciences, a commission of the Ukrainian People's Commissariat of Education was formed. In its findings the commission accused the management of the academy, and first of all the Presidium headed by Lipsky, of failure to comply with Soviet laws, and charged them with political violations. The commission suggested immediate re-election of the president of the academy, rerunning the procedure of confirming membership in the academy, and establishing a rigid structure and personnel pool for the academy. Communist Party leaders thought Vladimir Lipsky to be a 'politically inert' President, who delegated management of the Academy to Serhiy Yefremov and Ahatanhel Krymsky. In 1928 Vladimir sent in his resignation from the position of the president of the Ukrainian Academy of Sciences.

=== Odessa period ===
On 21 June 1928, having resigned as the president of the academy, Vladimir Lipsky moved to Odessa, where he headed the Odessa Botanical Garden. During his work in Odessa, he greatly contributed to the research in the Botanical Garden and its expansion, training of young researchers and sorting and arranging the herbarium.

During 1927–1930 he studied algae of the Black Sea (in particular, in the vicinity of Kara Dag Biological Station, researched influence of vegetation of the Atmanaysky estuary in the Azov Sea on saline formation and deposition; he participated in the work of the Ukrainian Institute for resin and rubber plants. He was particularly interested in the studies of red Phyllophora. This algae became raw material to manufacture iodine and agar-agar, which were then imported from abroad. So called iodine expeditions in the Black Sea were carried out in 1930–1931 on board of Sirena yacht, Drug Zhizni and Lyskovsky ships, and as a result, thanks to Vladimir Lipsky's efforts, the first in Ukraine iodine plant was opened in 1931 in Odessa.

Vladimir was Odessa Botanical Garden Director until 1933, then he resigned in protest against the ideas of Trofim Lysenko and until his death he worked as a scientific consultant of the Odessa Botanical Garden. He made his last research trip to Uzbekistan and Turkmenistan in 1936.

Vladimir Lipsky died on 24 February 1937 in Odessa.

=== Some plants discovered by or named after Vladimir Lipsky ===
- Fagus orientalis
- Artemisia lipskyi
- Inula magnifica Lipsky

== Memory ==
Two new genera were named after Vladimir Lipsky: Lipskya of family Apiaceae, and Lipskyella of family Asteraceae. 54 new species of plants were named after Vladimir Lipsky (including Stipa lipskyi, Euphorbia lipskyi, Thymus lipskyi, Acer lipskyi), which were included into floristic collections of all countries.

During the 1950s, the grave and tombstone of Vladimir Lipsky were destroyed and the place of his burial was lost. Only upon request of the Presidium of the Ukrainian Academy of Sciences, in 1990 the executive committee of the Odessa City Council issued a decree memorializing Academic Vladimir Lipsky.

== Sources ==
- Шеляг-Сосонко Ю. Р., Зиман С. М. (1983) Видатний флорист і організатор науки. До 120-річчя від дня народження В. І. Липського. In: Вісник АН УРСР, vol. 9, Ю. Р. Шеляг-Сосонко, С. М. Зиман. – P. 94–96. (in Ukrainian) ISSN 0372-6436
- Крецул Н. І. Кандидатська дисертація з історії [спеціальність 07.00.07 – історія науки і техніки, УДК 929:58 (091)]. 2005. ІСТОРИКО-НАУКОВИЙ АНАЛІЗ ДІЯЛЬНОСТІ АКАДЕМІКА В. І. ЛИПСЬКОГО В КОНТЕКСТІ РОЗВИТКУ БОТАНІЧНОЇ НАУКИ В УКРАЇНІ. Центр досліджень науково-технічного потенціалу та історії науки ім. Г. М. Доброва НАН України. Текст автореферату (in Ukrainian)
- Береговий П. М. Володимир Іполитович Липський / П. М. Береговий, М. А. Лагутіна // Видатні вітчизняні ботаніки. — Вид. 2-е. — К., 1969. — С. 119–123. (in Ukrainian)
- Доброчаєва Д. М. Життя, повне сонця і тепла / Д. М. Доброчаєва, Г. П. Мокрицький // Аксіоми для нащадків : укр. імена у світовій науці. — Л., 1991. — С. 169–185. (in Ukrainian)
- Липский Владимир Ипполитович / Т. П. Бабий, Л. Л. Коханова, Г. Г. Костюк [и др.] // Биологи : биогр. справ. — К., 1984. — С. 373–374. (in Russian)
- Осіюк Л. Дослідження вищих рослин ученими Київського університету св. Володимира / Л. Осіюк // Біологія і хімія в шк. — 1999. — No. 5. — С. 47. (in Ukrainian)
- Салівон А. Володимир Іполитович Липський (1863–1937) / А. Салівон // Біологія і хімія в шк. — 1998 .— No. 4 .— С. 41–42. (in Ukrainian)
- Шендеровський В. Неперевершений знавець природи / В. Шендеровський // Уряд. кур’єр .— 2003 .— 19 лип. — С. 11. (in Ukrainian)
- Крецул Н. І. Роль гербарію в науковій діяльності Липського В. І. 1887–1917 рр. // Історія української науки на межі тисячоліть: 3б. наук. праць /Відпов. ред. О. Я. Пилипчук. — Київ, 2001. — Вип. 5. — С. 120–124. (in Ukrainian)
- Крецул Н. І. В. І. Липський − організатор ботанічних садів // Історія української науки на межі тисячоліть: 3б. наук. праць /Відпов. ред. О. Я. Пилипчук. – Київ, 2001. – Вип. 6. — С. 94–99. (in Ukrainian)
- Крецул Н. І. Володимир Липський про ботанічні сади Європи //Історія української науки на межі тисячоліть: 3б. наук. праць /Відпов. ред. О. Я. Пилипчук. — Київ, 2002. — Вип. 7. — С. 120–126. (in Ukrainian)
- Крецул Н. І. Флористичні дослідження В.І. Липського // Історія української науки на межі тисячоліть: 3б. наук. праць /Відпов. ред. О. Я. Пилипчук. — Київ, 2002. — Вип. 8. — С. 157–163. (in Ukrainian)

== External references ==
- Vladimir I. Lipsky and his family tree in Rodovid.org
- Ukrainian scientists-biologists (in Ukrainian)
- Клим Щербатий. Фахівець ботанічних садів. (An expert in botanic gardens) «Обрій ПІБ» — Газета АКБ Промінвестбанк. (in Ukrainian)

Preceded by Orest Levytskyi	President of NANU; 1922–1928	Succeeded by Danylo Zabolotny
