= Odesa Botanical Garden =

Botanical garden in Odesa Oblast, Ukraine

Coordinates: 46°26′31″N 30°46′08″E

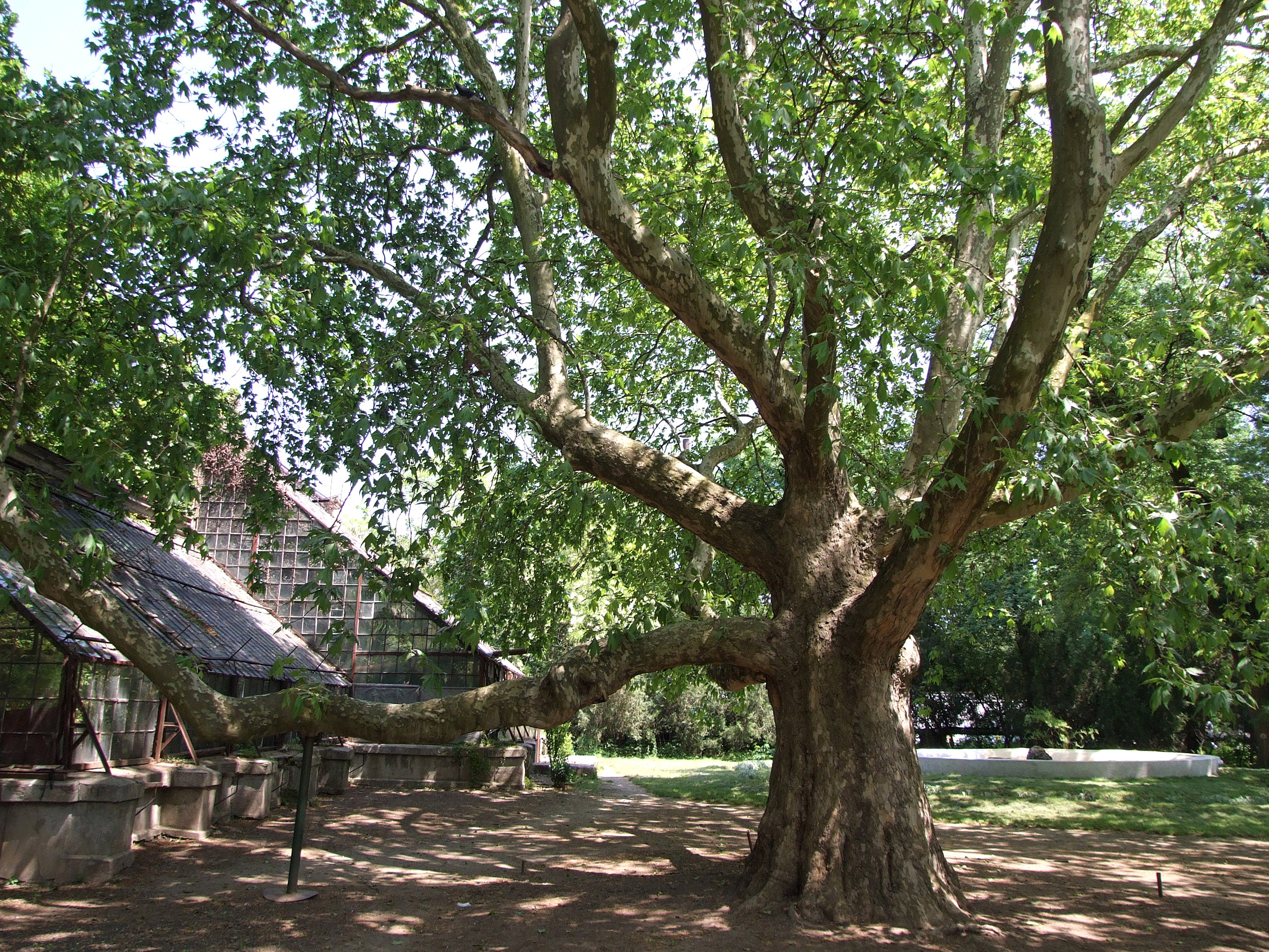
- Interactive map of Odesa Botanical Garden
- Type: Botanical Gardens
- Location: Frantsuzskyi Bulvar, Odesa
- Created: 1842
- Operator: Odesa University
- Website: http://garden.onu.edu.ua/

Odesa Botanical Garden is a botanical garden in Odesa, Ukraine. It is subordinated to Odesa University and consists of two territories: old territory and new territory.

== History ==
The Botanical Garden in Odesa was established in 1820, on the initiative of Governor-General Alexander Fedorovich Langeron, an expert in culture of the Sharlem Dessementom rose. In 1834–1848 it was further developed under the lead of Alexander von Nordmann, and a Central School of Gardening with a Department of Sericulture were also established.

Under the guidance of Professor L.V. Reingard, professor of botany, and L.A. Rishavi, an expert in plant anatomy and physiology, plants and seeds were brought from different parts of the world, including Paris, Singapore, Melbourne, Saigon, Berlin, and Palermo.
