= Elizabeth Lipski =

American nutritionist

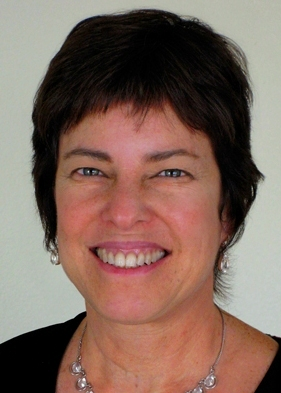
- Education: PhD
- Alma mater: Union Institute & University
- Occupations: Author, nutritionist, educator
- Spouse: Chris Dennen
- Writing career
- Genre: Clinical Nutrition (Specialization in integrative medicine)
- Website: www.lizlipski.com

Elizabeth Lipski is an American clinical nutritionist (CCN) and author of several books on nutrition and digestion including Digestive Wellness in 2005.

== Personal life and education ==
Lipski was born to Sylvia (née Lavender) and Arthur Z Lipski. She has one brother and one sister and grew up in Highland Park, Illinois. She is married to Chris Dennen. She earned her PhD in clinical nutrition from the Union Institute & University.

== Career ==
Lipski has been working in the field of nutrition, holistic health, herbology, lifestyle management, and relaxation and visualization techniques, for over 30 years. She has worked in medicine and academia and was most recently named director of academic development, nutrition and integrative health at the Maryland University of Integrative Health (MUIH). In 2013 she also became academic director at the Tai Sophia Institute in Laurel, Baltimore and director of doctoral studies at Hawthorne University. Lipski was nominated for the 2022 University Marshall award from MUIH.

Lipski has been on the faculties of the Institute for Functional Medicine and Autism Research Institute, and on the advisory boards of Autism Hope Alliance, Food as Medicine and Ceres Foundation. She was the founder of Innovative Healing Inc.

Lipski holds the following certifications and licenses:

- Institute for Functional Medicine Certified Practitioner (IFMCP)
- Fellow of the American College of Nutrition (FACN)
- Certified Nutrition Specialist (CNS)
- Certified in Holistic Nutrition (BCHN)
- Licensed Dietitian-Nutritionist (LDN)

== Publications ==
=== Books ===
- Leaky Gut Syndrome (1 ed.). McGraw-Hill. 1998. ISBN 978-0879838249.
- Digestive Wellness for Children: How to Strengthen the Immune System & Prevent Disease Through Healthy Digestion. Basic Health Publications. 2006. ISBN 978-1591201519.
- Digestive Wellness: Strengthen the Immune System and Prevent Disease Through Healthy Digestion (4 ed.). McGraw-Hill. 2012. ISBN 978-0071668996.
- Digestion Connection: The Simple, Natural Plan to Combat Diabetes, Heart Disease, Osteoporosis, Arthritis, Acid Reflux--And More!. Rodale, Inc. 2013. ISBN 978-1-60961-945-9.
