= Lipnitsky =

Lipnitsky (Russian:Липницкий, Hebrew: ליפניק) is a surname in male form (the female form is Lipnitskaya or Lipnitskaia [Липницкая]). Polish form: Lipnicki. Notable people with the surname include:

- Isaac Lipnitsky
- Aleksandr Lipnitsky
- Teodor Lipnitsky
- Yulia Lipnitskaya
