= Fort Alexander (Saint Petersburg) =

Fort near Kronstadt

- In the Gulf of Finland, 20 miles west of the central Saint Petersburg
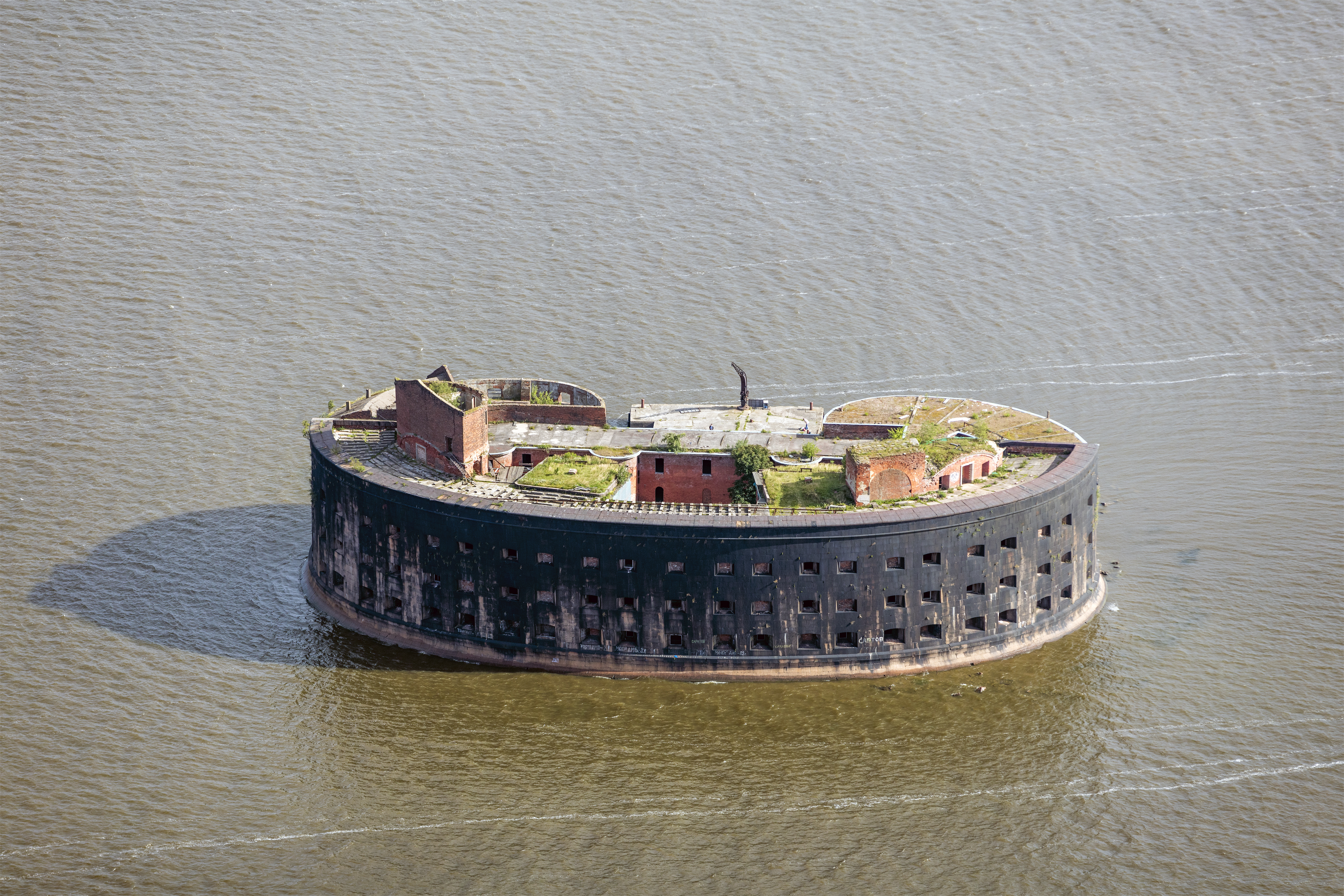
- Fort Alexander in 2016

Site information
- Type: Fortress
- Controlled by: Russia

Location
- Location within Saint Petersburg
- Coordinates: 59.989586°N 29.717846°E

Site history
- Built: Started 1838, completed 1845
- In use: 1845–1917

Fort Alexander, also Fort Alexander I, or Plague Fort (Russian: Форт Александр Первый Fort Aleksandr Perviy or Russian: Чумный форт Chumnyi fort, English: "Plague fort") is a sea fort on an artificial island in the Gulf of Finland near Kronstadt, one of the sea forts of the Kronstadt Fortress. From 1899 to 1917, the fort housed a research laboratory on plague and other bacterial diseases.

== Foundation ==
Since the formation of Saint Petersburg in 1703, the waterways in the Gulf of Finland were of strategic importance for Russia. Peter I initiated the construction of forts in the Gulf of Finland and directed the foundation of the first military installation on the island of Kotlin, Fort Kronshlot, in 1704. Throughout the following two centuries, Russia continued to fortify the area.

Louis Barthelemy Carbonnier d'Arsit de Gragnac (aka Lev Lvovich Carbonnier) drafted the initial blueprint for Fort Alexander. Earlier, he had planned the 1827 reconstruction of another military installation in the Gulf of Finland, Fort Citadel (later Fort Peter I). Upon Carbonnier's death in 1836, Jean Antoine Maurice (aka Moris Gugovich Destrem), a Russian military engineer of French origin, revised the plan for a new fort. The construction began in 1838 and under the supervision of another Russian military engineer, Mikhail von der Veide. The builders drove 5535 piles, each 12-meters long, into the sea bed to reinforce the ground. They then covered the piles with a layer of sand, a layer of concrete blocks, and a layer of granite slabs. The brickwork of the fort received granite face-work. Emperor Nikolay I officially commissioned the fort on 27 July 1845; the fort was named to honor his brother, Emperor Alexander I.

== Layout ==
The fort's design is close to that of Fort Boyard in France. It is an oval-shaped building with a yard in its center. The building measures 90 meters by 60 meters, with three floors. The overall floor space is over 5000 sq. meters. In all, the fort was large enough to hold a garrison of up to 1000 men. There are 103 cannon ports with additional space on the roof for 34 guns.

== Military use ==
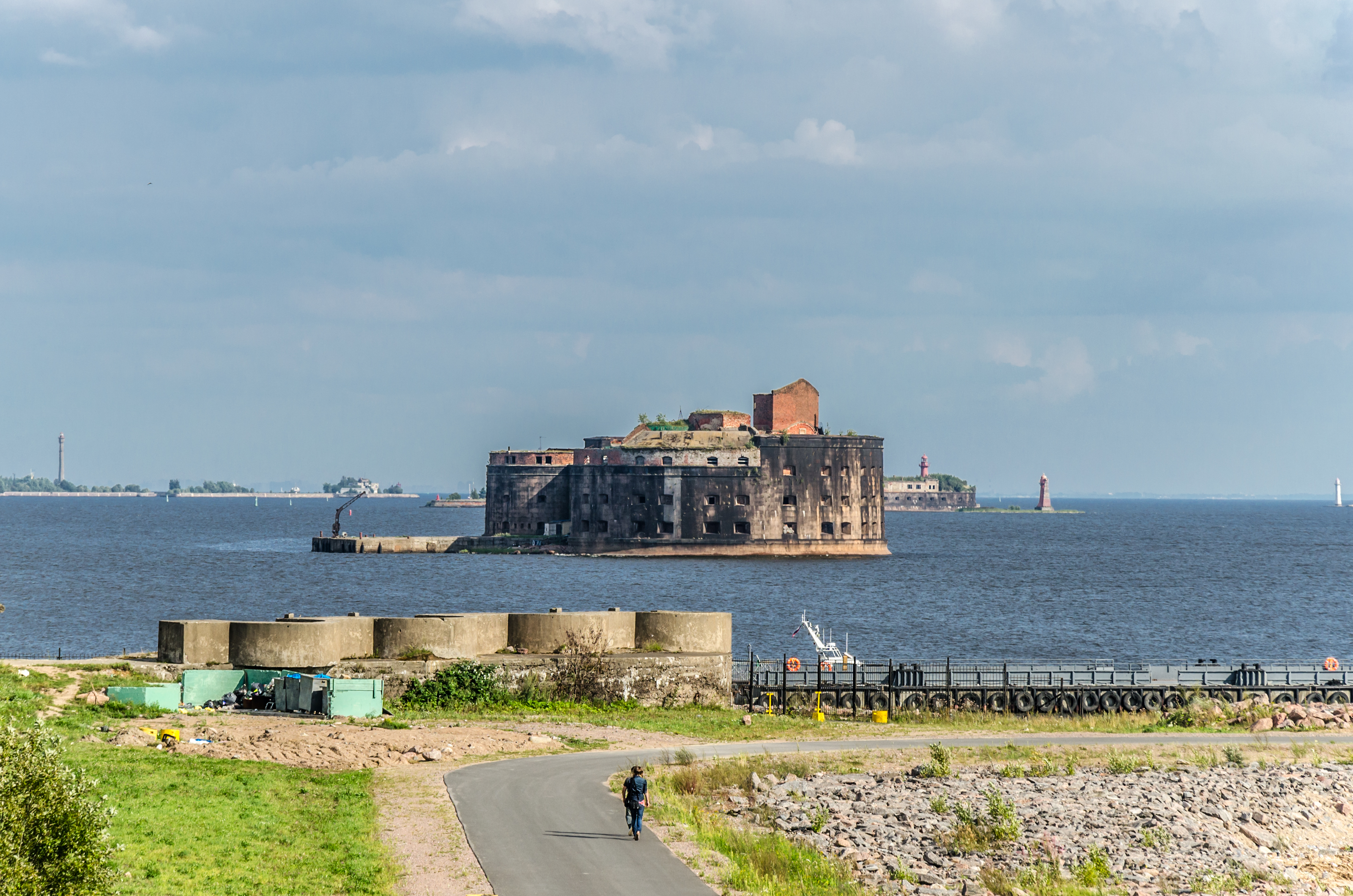
View of Fort Alexander from Kronstadt

The fort's mission was to guard the Baltic waterway to Saint Petersburg south of naval base Kronstadt on Kotlin, in combination with Fort Peter I, Fort Risbank (later Fort Pavel I), Fort Kronshlot and the coastal battery Fort Constantin.

The fort never participated in any military action. Still, it played a role in the Crimean War when it protected the Russian naval base in Kronstadt against attempts by the Royal Navy and French fleets. Waters surrounding Fort Alexander and other Kronstadt fortifications witnessed the first ever deployment of galvanic naval mines designed by Moritz von Jacobi and chemical-contact naval mines developed by Immanuel Nobel. In June 1854, a squadron of the Royal Navy, under the command of Admiral Napier, approached the Kronstadt area, but evidence of mine fields and the heavy fortifications discouraged Napier from attacking Kronstadt. In the summer of 1855, an Anglo-French fleet under the command of Vice-Admiral Dundas tried to conduct minesweeping raids using small steamboats. British forces managed to raise several mines, at the cost of four vessels damaged or destroyed. Because the approach of the fleet within the range of the guns of coastal batteries and the forts would make sweeping procedures even more hazardous, Dundas gave up on his objective of attacking Kronstadt.

After 1855, Fort Alexander twice went on full alert: once in 1863, when a possible confrontation with the British Empire was anticipated, and again during the Russo-Turkish War (1877–1878). Upgrades to the fort were made in 1868–1869, 1867, and 1885. However, by the end of the 19th century, Fort Alexander was primarily used for ammunition storage, as the development of rifled artillery rendered the fort facilities, designed in an era of smoothbore guns, ineffective for defensive purposes. In 1896, Fort Alexander, Fort Peter I and Fort Pavel I were struck from the Russian military register.

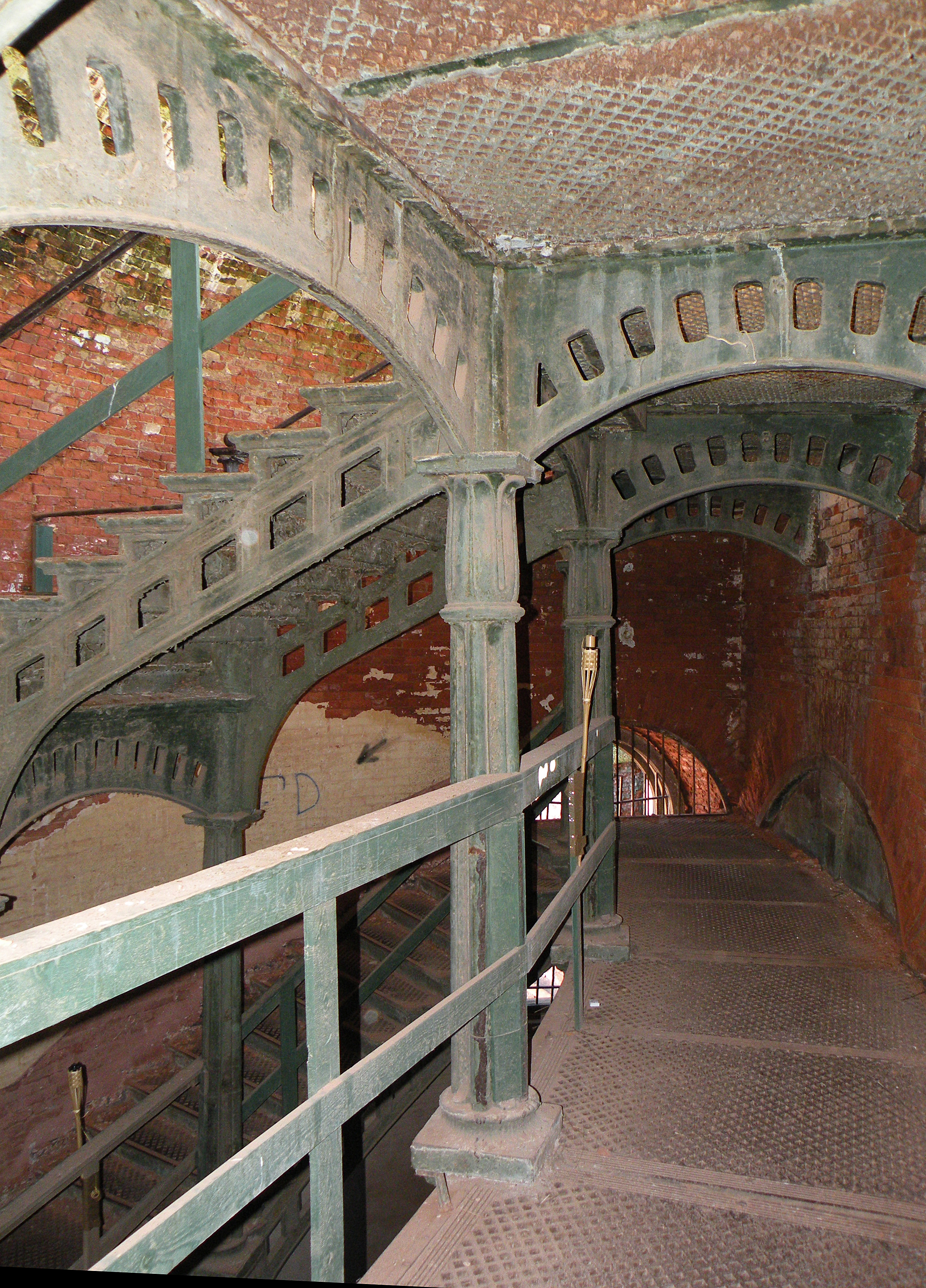
Interior view of Fort Alexander

== Bacteriology research facility ==
In the 1890s, in wake of the discovery of the plague pathogen by Alexandre Yersin in 1894, the Russian government formed a special Commission on the Prevention of Plague Disease to facilitate research in this specific area of bacteriology. Fort Alexander's isolation led the commission to establish a new research laboratory there in January 1897. This laboratory was a part of Imperial Institute of Experimental Medicine (now Institute of Experimental Medicine of the Russian Academy of Medical Sciences). Fort Alexander was renovated for the new purpose in 1897–1899, largely with funds from Duke Alexander Petrovich of Oldenburg, and featured a science library, research labs including containment labs, a stable for laboratory horses, cremation facility for lab animals, and other auxiliary facilities. Research work in Fort Alexander took off in August 1899 and was mainly focused on the study of plague disease and preparation of plague serum and vaccine from the immunized horses. Danylo Zabolotny, Mikhail Gavrilovich Tartakovsky, and Nikolai Mikhailovich Berestnev were the three researchers who arrived there in 1898 to oversee the work. In the following years, the laboratory is reported to have worked also on the development of serums against cholera, tetanus, typhus, scarlatina, and a series of Staphylococcus and Streptococcus infections. Work was hazardous and there were three pneumonic and bubonic plague cases among the staff members in 1904 and 1907 resulting in two fatalities. After the Communist takeover in 1917, the laboratory in Fort Alexander ceased operations. Research assets were transferred to various institutes in Petrograd, Moscow, and Saratov.

== Current status ==
Fort Alexander in 2025

After 1917, the fort was formally owned by Russian Navy, which maintained storage facilities and a repair shop there. By 1983, the fort was stripped of its fixtures and abandoned. In the late 1990s and early 2000s, Fort Alexander was a popular location for rave parties. Since 2005 the fort was formally managed by the administration of the presidential conference center known as Constantine Palace in Strelna. The access inside the fort premises through the only gate of the fortress was secured since then.

In 2007, the administration of the fort announced its intention to seek investors for the proposed renovation project estimated at $43 million.

From 2005 to 2010, the Saint Petersburg Dam navigation floodgate for the main shipping channel of the Gulf of Finland was being constructed less than a mile from Fort Alexander. A new pathway for the shipping channel required extensive dredging in waters in the vicinity of Fort Alexander. Serious concerns were raised on the negative impact of dredging efforts and expected increase in wave disturbance from passerby ships on the integrity of the foundation at Fort Alexander.

As of 2011, boat tours to the fort are available.

In 2025, the fortress was used by Russian TV channel STS to film a local adaptation of the French game show Fort Boyard.
